= Front–Girard station =

Rapid transit station in Philadelphia

Front–Girard
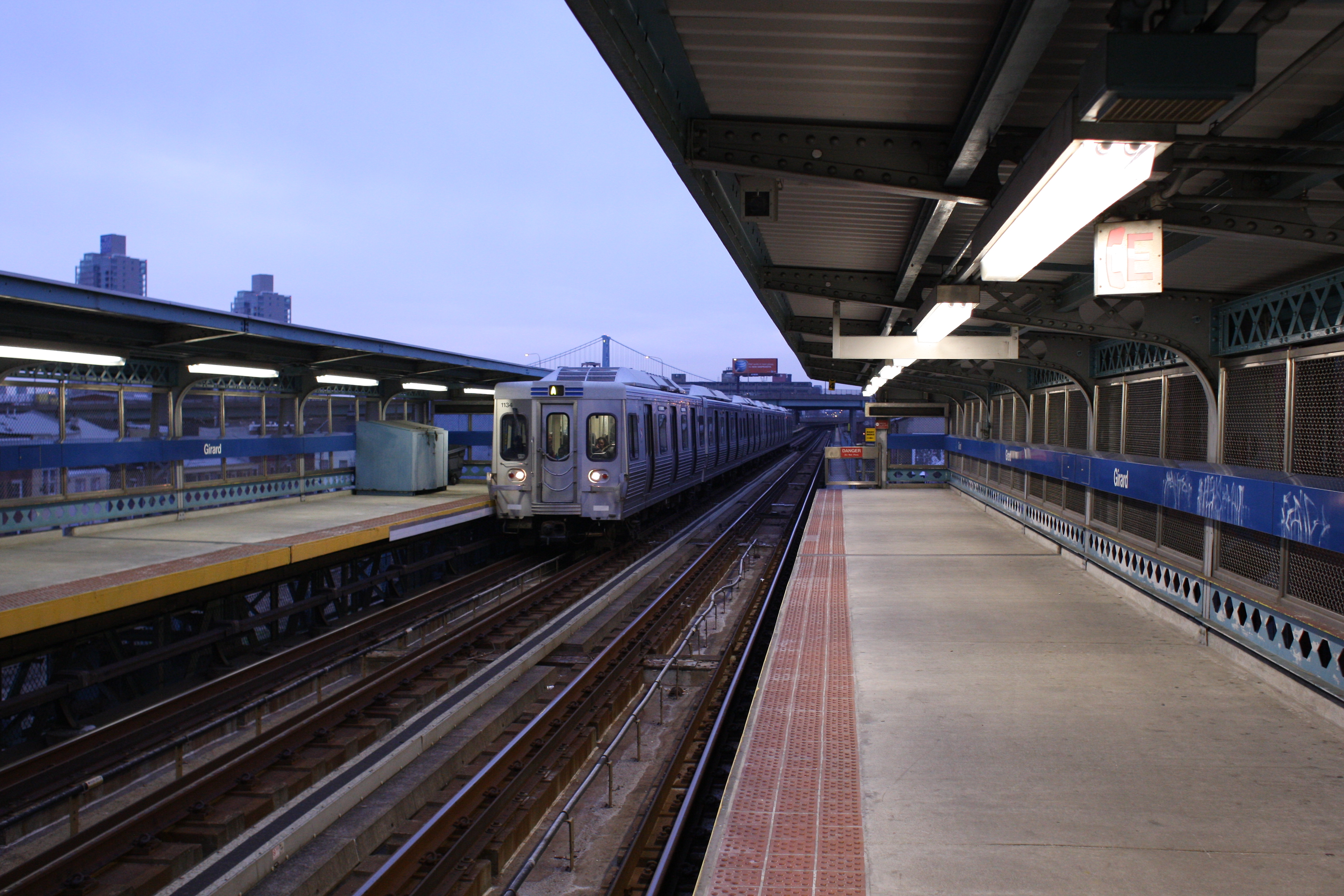
- A L1 train of M-4 cars arriving at the L platforms of Front—Girard station, looking south.

General information
- Location: 1200 North Front Street, Philadelphia, Pennsylvania
- Coordinates: 39.9689°N 75.1362°W
- Owner: City of Philadelphia
- Operator: SEPTA
- Platforms: 2 side platforms
- Tracks: 4 (2 per line)
- Connections: SEPTA City Bus: 5, 25

Construction
- Accessible: Yes

History
- Opened: November 5, 1922
- Rebuilt: 1997
- Former names: Girard (1922–2025)

Services
Preceding station	SEPTA Metro	Following station
Spring Garden toward 69th Street T.C.	L (SEPTA Metro)	Berks toward Frankford T.C.
Broad–Girard toward 63rd–Girard	major stops	Frankford–Delaware toward Richmond–Westmoreland
Track layout
Location

Front–Girard station is a rapid transit and trolley station served by SEPTA Metro L and G trains in Philadelphia, Pennsylvania. The station situated at the corner of Front Street and Girard Avenue in the Fishtown neighborhood. SEPTA bus routes 5 and 25 serve the station.

== History ==
Front–Girard is part of the Frankford Elevated section of the L, which began service on November 5, 1922.

Between 1988 and 2003, SEPTA undertook a $493.3 million reconstruction of the 5.5-mile (8.9 km) Frankford Elevated.

Girard station (as it was known at the time) was completely rebuilt on the site of the original station; the project included new platforms, elevators, windscreens, and overpasses, and the station now meets ADA accessibility requirements. The line had originally been built with track ballast and was replaced with precast sections of slab track, allowing the station (and the entire line) to remain open throughout the project.

== Station layout ==
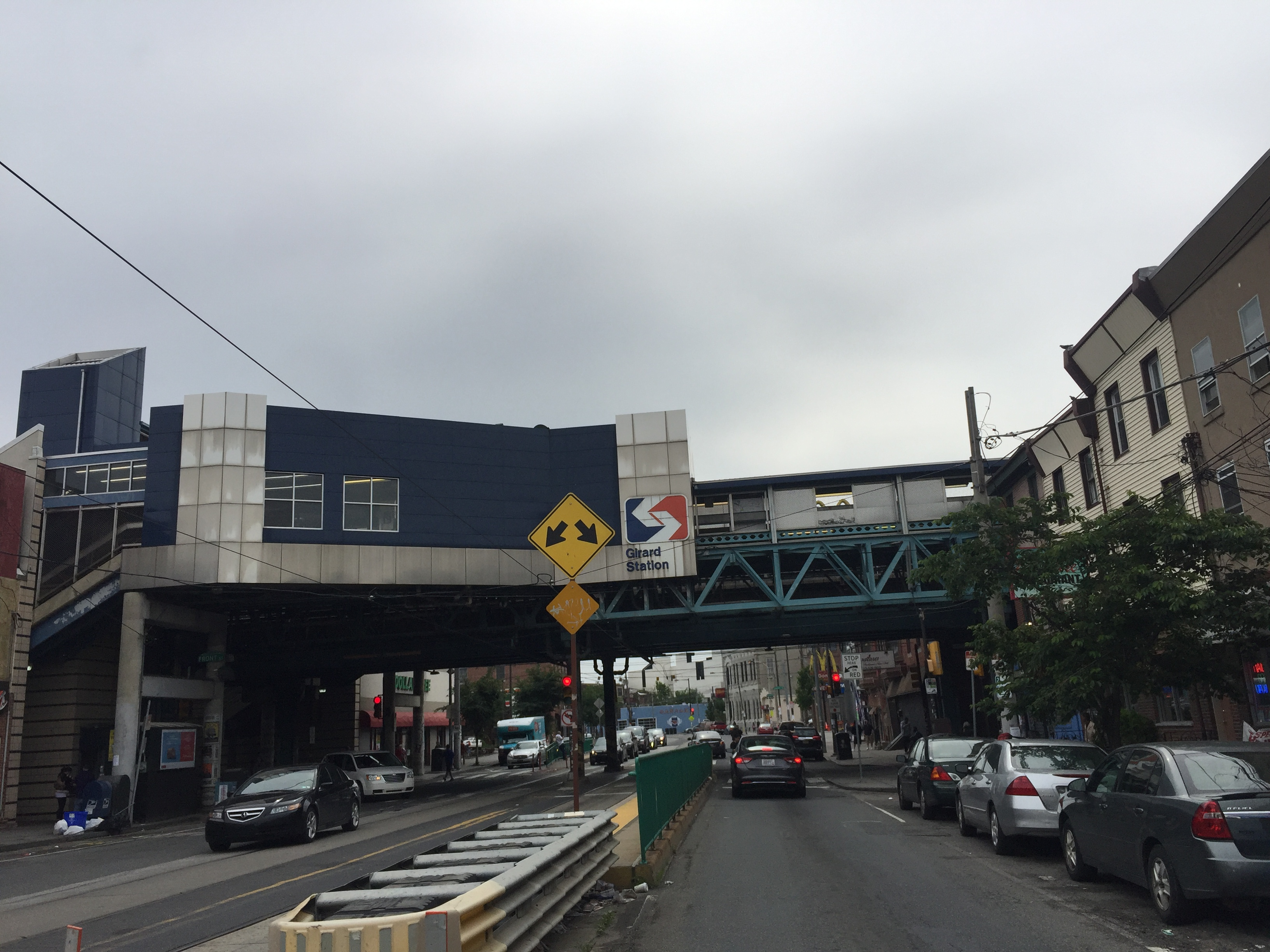
Eastbound trolley stop on Girard Avenue

The station's main entrance is located on the northwest corner of Front Street and Girard Avenue. This staircase leads to a fare control barrier serving the eastbound platform, along with an elevated overpass to the westbound platform.

The westbound platform has an exit-only staircase descending to the northeast corner of the intersection.
