= G (SEPTA) =

Trolley line in Philadelphia, Pennsylvania

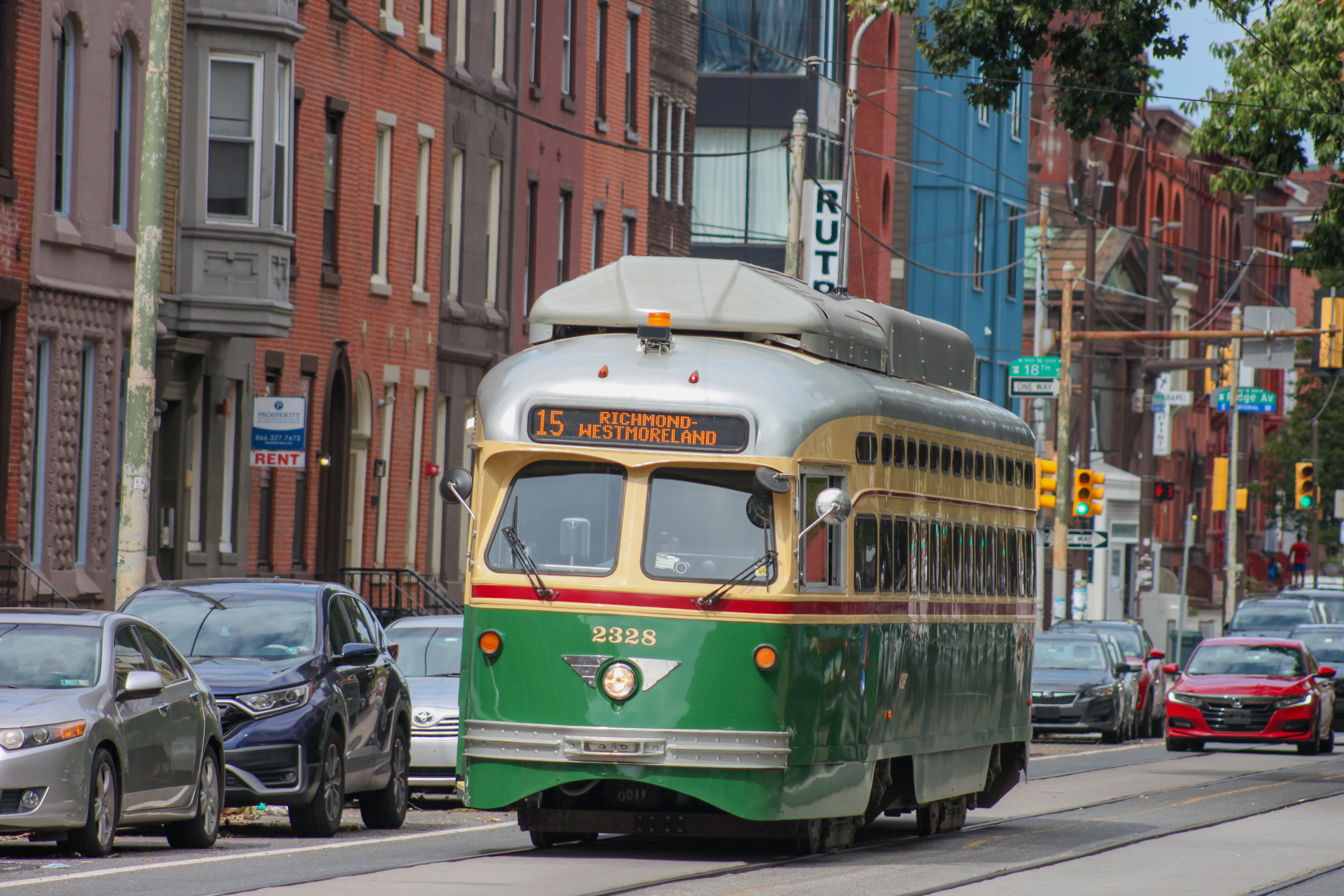
- SEPTA PCC III operating on the G

Overview
- Status: Limited service, bus shuttle
- Locale: Philadelphia, Pennsylvania
- Termini: 63rd–Girard; Richmond–Westmoreland
- Stations: 64 stops
- Website: septa.org/schedules/G1

Service
- Type: Streetcar
- System: SEPTA Metro
- Services: All Stops
- Operator: SEPTA
- Depot: Callowhill
- Rolling stock: SEPTA PCC III
- Daily ridership: 2,477 (ave. weekday, FY 2025)

History
- Opened: 1859; 2005; 2024
- Closed: 1992–2005; 2020–2024

Technical
- Line length: 8.4 miles (13.5 km)
- Track gauge: 5 ft 2 1/4 in (1,581 mm) Pennsylvania trolley gauge
- Electrification: Overhead line, 600 V DC
Route map
Template:G (SEPTA)

The G, (Note: Conventions for line names state they are to be referred to by letter only (i.e. "the G", not "the G line")) formerly known as the Route 15 Trolley, (Note: Also known as the Girard Avenue Line) is a streetcar line in the SEPTA Metro network that runs along Girard Avenue through North and West Philadelphia, Pennsylvania. Service is operated by the City Transit Division of the Southeastern Pennsylvania Transportation Authority. As of 2024, it is the only trolley line in Philadelphia that is not part of the subway–surface trolley lines. SEPTA PCC III vehicles are used on the line.

The line was first opened in 1859 as a horse car line operated by the Richmond and Schuylkill River Passenger Railway, and electrified in 1895, with extensions in 1902 and 1903. Service was "bustituted" in 1992, along with Route 23 (Germantown Avenue-11th and 12th Streets) and Route 56 (Torresdale-Erie Avenues). On September 4, 2005, trolley service was restored.

On April 29, 2012, east of Frankford Avenue, the line started being operated by buses due to major reconstruction. West of Frankford Avenue, the line was still run by PCC II cars. Trolleys terminated at Frankford and Delaware Avenues (Northern Liberties Loop) while buses terminated at Girard station under the Market-Frankford Line. From 2020 until 2024, the route was substituted by a bus bridge to allow for rolling stock maintenance, track repairs, and a nearby highway expansion.

== Route ==
The G's 8.4-mile (13.5 km) route runs along Girard Avenue and Richmond Street. The western terminus of the G is at the intersection of Girard Avenue and 63rd Street, and instantly passes by Carroll Park. The next landmark is Cathedral Cemetery, where both the G and Girard Avenue briefly overlap with US 30 (Lancaster Avenue) and the T1 trolley. The line leaves Lancaster Avenue and resumes its way along Girard Avenue. After crossing over the Philadelphia–Harrisburg line at the intersection with Belmont Avenue, the line passes by the Philadelphia Zoo near Exit 342 on the Schuylkill Expressway before crossing the Schuylkill River over the Girard Avenue Bridge.

After entering Brewerytown, the G loops partially around the south side of Girard College, but rejoins Girard Avenue again, and passes by the former Saint Joseph's Hospital. The first mass transit crossing the line encounters is the B's Broad–Girard station, and two blocks from there crosses the SEPTA Route 23 bus line (which was originally a trolley line that may be restored in the future; however SEPTA has removed all connecting track & overhead wires for Route 23 at this location in 2014 completely ending any connection to the North Philadelphia Trolley Network). Directly east of the SEPTA Main Line overpass at 9th Street, the G passes by the Girard Medical Center. At Front Street, the G runs beneath the L's Front–Girard station, and then crosses Frankford Avenue, one of the two streets the line is named after.

In 2011, SEPTA completed a new loop for the G at the intersection of Frankford and Delaware Avenues, reached via new trackage down Frankford from Girard. On April 29, 2012, SEPTA began using this loop. This loop is across from the Rivers Casino which opened in September 2010, and is also a natural turnback point due to high ridership turnover at Front Street and Girard for the Market-Frankford Line. The loop was the temporary eastern terminus of the then-Route 15 until SEPTA finished replacing track on Richmond between Girard Ave and Ann Street between spring and late 2012, due to Interstate 95-related reconstruction along Richmond Street (see section below). With resumption of trolley service on June 16, 2024, this loop was only used for select bus trips.

Girard Avenue ends at Exit 23 on I-95, so the G moves beneath the highway onto Richmond Street, parallel to I-95 until it crosses over the street from the north side to the south side before Exit 25, the interchange with Allegheny Avenue, where it connects to the SEPTA Route 60 bus, another former trolley line. The road runs along the Richmond Playground before the G's eastern terminus at the Westmoreland Loop, on the southwest corner of the intersection of Richmond Street and Westmoreland Street.

In addition to the Frankford and Delaware loop, two other short-turn loops exist: at 41st & Parkside, just west of the Philadelphia Zoo, and at 26th & Girard (a bidirectional "in-line" cutback utilizing 26th and Poplar Streets and Girard and College Avenues). No scheduled runs use these loops. Another such loop, located at Richmond Street & Cumberland Avenues, was frequently used when Richmond Street was blocked by trucks which failed to heed warning signs and flashing lights for a low bridge underneath the former Reading Port Richmond Yard of Conrail Shared Assets Operations. This loop has since been removed. Cars returning to Callowhill Depot turn off Girard at 60th Street.

== History ==
=== Early years ===
The Richmond and Schuylkill River Passenger Railway was chartered by the Pennsylvania General Assembly on March 26, 1859, to operate along Girard Avenue between the Girard Avenue Bridge over the Schuylkill River in Fairmount Park and Norris Street in Richmond, with an extension authorized west over the bridge to Lancaster Avenue. The line opened from Second Street to 31st Street in July 1859. The company was sold at foreclosure and reorganized as the Fairmount Park and Delaware River Passenger Railway on June 14, 1864, and was merged into the Germantown Passenger Railway (Route 23 Germantown Avenue) on February 15, 1866.

Extensions were opened east to Palmer Street in 1866 (looping via Palmer, Beach, and Shackamaxon Streets) and to Norris Street in 1875. The People's Passenger Railway leased the line on October 1, 1881, and leased the Girard Avenue Railway (chartered May 17, 1894) on June 22, 1896, extending the line west to 60th Street in 1900. The Union Traction Company leased the People's Passenger Railway on July 1, 1896, giving it control over almost all the street railways in Philadelphia. Girard Avenue cars were extended west to 63rd Street and east to Allegheny Avenue – the latter extension along the ex-Electric Traction Company Bridesburg Line on Richmond Street – in 1903, and eventually replaced the Bridesburg Line entirely to Bridesburg. In 1992, SEPTA replaced trolley service along Routes 15, 23, and 56 with buses.

PCC cars were first introduced to the then-Route 15 on Sundays (and later on Saturdays as well) in 1948 using postwar cars at Callowhill Depot that would have been otherwise idle on the weekend. They provided all service on the 15 in June 1955 after a cascade of postwar cars from other lines occurred when used PCC cars were purchased from St. Louis and Kansas City, Missouri. Service was cut back to Richmond & Westmoreland on February 24, 1956. PCCs provided all trolley service until SEPTA replaced the trolleys with buses on September 13, 1992. Trolley service returned briefly to Route 15 later in the 1990s using Kawasaki cars from Route 10 temporarily made surplus by water main replacement along the surface portion of Route 10.

=== 2005 trolley restoration ===
The 15 line returned to trolley service on September 4, 2005, after having been served by buses for thirteen years. To prepare for the resumption of trolley service, SEPTA spent a total of $100 million, including rehabilitating the tracks and repairs to the overhead wires. The rolling stock for then-Route 15 consists of PCC II cars, which are 1947 St. Louis Car-built PCC streetcars that had been completely rebuilt by the Brookville Equipment Company at a cost of $1.3 million per trolley in 2003-2004. The rebuilt trolley includes the addition of air conditioning and regenerative braking, as well as a widened center door with a wheelchair lift for ADA compliance.

The restoration of trolley service was delayed because of a long fight with local residents on 59th Street, which the trolleys needed to travel down in order to access the Callowhill Depot, over parking on the street. During the reconstruction of the line the surrounding neighborhoods, through grassroots coalitions, worked to improve the Girard Avenue streetscape through beautification and marketing projects. Since service returned in 2005, the 15 line has spurred various development projects as well as renewed investment along the corridor.

In 2018 a comprehensive analysis of SEPTA's surface operations called for the transit agency to consider replacing trolley operations with a high-frequency bus route, citing the rail car's inability to get around double-parked cars and other obstacles.

=== Port Richmond reconstruction and I-95 ===
The G east of the new Northern Liberties loop is being rebuilt as part of a reconstruction project for Interstate 95. The components of the I-95 project related to the G include reconstruction of Girard Avenue's bridge over Aramingo Avenue, and widening and partial realignment of Richmond Street. All the tracks in these areas will be replaced, except for the Richmond & Cumberland loop which will be removed. Also part of the project is the construction of four separate bridges for Conrail tracks over a realigned Richmond Street to replace the low-clearance nuisance bridge left over from the former Port Richmond Yard. The new bridges, rationalized in width to current Conrail trackage, will provide much greater road clearance by virtue of being relocated away from underneath the I-95 viaduct. The then-Route 15 east of Frankford Avenue to the Frankford and Delaware Avenue station and the SugarHouse Casino was served by a shuttle bus for the duration of the project, which was expected to last through 2018. On January 21, 2020, SEPTA officials announced that buses would be replacing the streetcars along the whole route for a period of at least 18 months.

=== SEPTA Metro era ===
In 2021, SEPTA proposed rebranding their rail transit service as "SEPTA Metro" to make the system easier to navigate. Under this proposal, services along the Girard Avenue Line would have been rebranded as the "G" lines with a yellow color, each receiving a numeric suffix. Local service would become the G1 Girard Avenue Local. Following a period of public comment, Route 15's proposed name was simplified to "G."

In 2023, SEPTA awarded Alstom Transportation the contract to build 130 new low-floor trams for the existing Subway–Surface lines, along with the Media–Sharon Hill Line, with an option for 30 more. These 30 extra trams, if ordered, would replace the existing PCC-III trolleys on the G. The trolleys would be of Alstom's Citadis family and would be 80 feet in length and low-floor (and therefore fully ADA-compliant). While the existing PCC-III trolleys are ADA-compliant as a result of their wheelchair lift, this lift is cumbersome and presents a significant source of delays across the line during regular operation. The first trolley is expected to be delivered from Alstom in the Spring of 2027, with the last trolley from the base order to be delivered some time in 2030. SEPTA does not plan on reconstructing the G for its Trolley Modernization Program until 2041 at the earliest.

As of July 7, 2023, the I-95 reroute work had been substantially completed, but trolley service not yet restored. WHYY reported that SEPTA officials had stated that several of the now twice refurbished PCC-II cars were in testing on the route and "at least" eight would be ready by "the end of the summer [2023]." [...] "The plan is to use trolleys and buses to serve the G, which allows us to deploy the restored trolleys while maintaining frequency on the route,” a SEPTA spokesperson told Billy Penn. As of August 2023, six of the cars had been restored, and SEPTA had announced a partial restoration of trolley service starting September 10, 2023. However, citing the need for more operator training, the agency has delayed the restoration, though still expected to resume trolley service sometime in late 2023. The restoration has since been pushed back to spring 2024. In June, SEPTA announced eight restored trolleys will resume service alongside buses on June 16, 2024.

== Stations ==
All stations are in the City of Philadelphia.

Neighborhood	Station or stop	Connections	Notes
Haddington– Carroll Park line	63rd–Girard (EB)	SEPTA City Bus: 31	
Haddington– Carroll Park line	63rd–Haverford (WB)	SEPTA City Bus: 30, 31	
Haddington– Carroll Park line	62nd–Girard (EB)		
Haddington– Carroll Park line	62nd–Haverford (WB)	SEPTA City Bus: 30	
Haddington– Carroll Park line	61st–Girard (EB)		
Haddington– Carroll Park line	61st–Haverford (WB)	SEPTA City Bus: 30	
Haddington– Carroll Park line	60th–Girard	SEPTA City Bus: 30, 46	
Haddington– Carroll Park line	59th–Girard		
Haddington– Carroll Park line	57th–Girard	SEPTA City Bus: 63	
Haddington– Carroll Park line	56th–Girard	SEPTA City Bus: 63	
Haddington– Carroll Park line	54th–Girard		
Haddington– Carroll Park line	52nd–Girard	SEPTA City Bus: 52	
Mill Creek– Cathedral Park line	51st–Girard		
Mill Creek– Cathedral Park line	49th–Girard (WB)	SEPTA Metro:	
Mill Creek– Cathedral Park line	Lancaster–Girard (EB)	SEPTA Metro:	
Mill Creek– Cathedral Park line	Merion–Girard		
Mill Creek– Cathedral Park line	Belmont–Girard	SEPTA City Bus: 43	
Parkside	42nd–Girard		
Parkside	41st–Girard	SEPTA City Bus: 40	
Parkside	40th Street/Parkside	SEPTA City Bus: 38, 40	
Parkside	39th–Girard		
Parkside	34th Street/Zoo		Access to Philadelphia Zoo
Fairmount– Brewerytown line	33rd–Girard (WB)	SEPTA City Bus: 32	
Fairmount– Brewerytown line	31st–Girard		
Fairmount– Brewerytown line	29th–Girard	SEPTA City Bus: 7, 48, 49	
Fairmount– Brewerytown line	28th–Girard		
Fairmount– Brewerytown line	27th–Girard	SEPTA City Bus: 7	
Fairmount– Brewerytown line	26th–Girard		
Fairmount– Brewerytown line	Poplar–26th (EB)	SEPTA City Bus: 32	
Fairmount– Brewerytown line	Stillman–Poplar (EB)		
Fairmount– Brewerytown line	25th–Poplar (WB)		
Fairmount– Cecil B. Moore line	24th–College		
Fairmount– Cecil B. Moore line	Corinthian–Girard		
Fairmount– Cecil B. Moore line	20th–Girard	SEPTA City Bus: 33	
Fairmount– Cecil B. Moore line	19th–Girard	SEPTA City Bus: 33	
Fairmount– Cecil B. Moore line	Ridge–Girard	SEPTA City Bus: 61	
Fairmount– Cecil B. Moore line	17th–Girard	SEPTA City Bus: 2	
Fairmount– Cecil B. Moore line	16th–Girard	SEPTA City Bus: 2	
Fairmount– Cecil B. Moore line	Broad–Girard	SEPTA Metro: SEPTA City Bus: 4, 16	
West Poplar– Yorktown line	12th–Girard	SEPTA City Bus: 23	
West Poplar– Yorktown line	11th–Girard	SEPTA City Bus: 23	
Poplar– Ludlow line	8th–Girard	SEPTA City Bus: 47	
Poplar– Ludlow line	7th–Girard	SEPTA City Bus: 47	
Poplar– Ludlow line	5th–Girard		
Northern Liberties– Olde Kensington line	4th–Girard (WB)	SEPTA City Bus: 57	
Northern Liberties– Olde Kensington line	3rd–Girard	SEPTA City Bus: 5, 57	
Northern Liberties– Olde Kensington line	2nd–Girard	SEPTA City Bus: 5	
Northern Liberties– Olde Kensington line	Front–Girard	SEPTA Metro: SEPTA City Bus: 5	
Fishtown	Frankford–Girard	SEPTA City Bus: 5, 25	
Richmond–Westmoreland branch
Fishtown	Columbia–Girard		
Fishtown	Palmer–Girard		
Fishtown	Berks–Girard		
Olde Richmond	Girard–Richmond		
Olde Richmond	Cumberland–Richmond	SEPTA City Bus: 39, 43	
Olde Richmond	Huntingdon–Richmond	SEPTA City Bus: 39	
Olde Richmond	Lehigh–Richmond		
Port Richmond	Somerset–Richmond	SEPTA City Bus: 54	
Port Richmond	Cambria–Richmond	SEPTA City Bus: 54	
Port Richmond	Ann–Richmond		
Port Richmond	Clearfield–Richmond		
Port Richmond	Allegheny–Richmond	SEPTA City Bus: 60	
Port Richmond	Richmond–Westmoreland	SEPTA City Bus: 60, 73, 53	
Frankford–Delaware branch
Fishtown	Richmond–Frankford	SEPTA City Bus: 25	
Fishtown	Frankford–Delaware	SEPTA City Bus: 25, 43	Access to The Fillmore
