= SEPTA PCC III =

Rebuilt streetcar

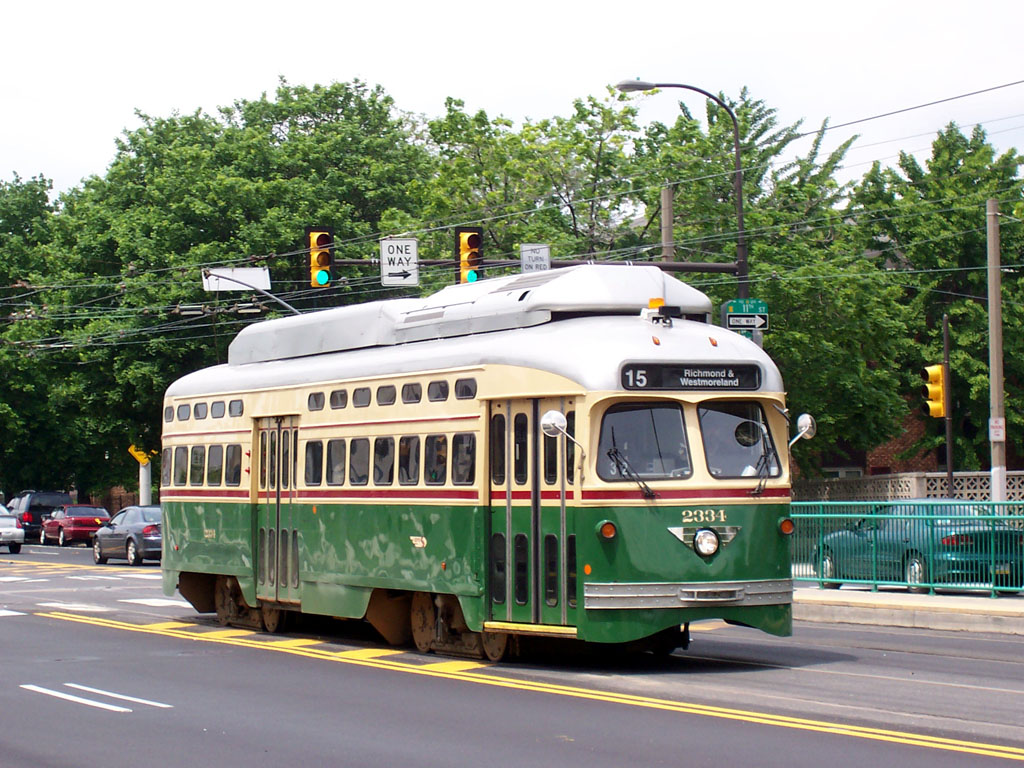
- SEPTA PCC II car 2334 before PCC III rebuild on Route 15.
- Stock type: Streetcar
- Manufacturers: Original PCCs: St. Louis Car Company; Rebuilt PCC IIs: Brookville Equipment Company; Rebuilt PCC IIIs: SEPTA Woodland Avenue shop
- Family name: Presidents' Conference Committee
- Constructed: 1947 (as PCC streetcars)
- Refurbished: 2002–2004 (to PCC IIs); 2020–2024 (to PCC IIIs)
- Number built: 18 (PCC IIs)
- Fleet numbers: 2320–2337
- Capacity: 46 (103 including standees, 40 with two wheelchairs)
- Operator: SEPTA
- Line served: SEPTA Metro G

Specifications
- Car length: 46.5 ft (14.2 m)
- Width: 8 ft (2.44 m)
- Height: 11 ft (3.35 m)
- Doors: 2
- Maximum speed: 40 mph (64 km/h)
- Weight: 37,400 lb (16,964 kg) empty 53,000 lb (24,040 kg) full
- Traction system: 1 hour: 4 × 55 hp (41 kW); Continuous: 4 × 48 hp (36 kW)
- Power output: 67 hp (50 kW)
- Acceleration: max. 4.3 mph/s (1.9 m/s/s)
- Deceleration: 3.6 mph/s (1.6 m/s/s) (service); 9.0 mph/s (4.0 m/s/s) (max.)
- Electric systems: Overhead line, 600 V DC
- Current collection: Trolley pole
- Braking systems: Combined regenerative and rheostatic
- Track gauge: 5 ft 2 1/2 in (1,588 mm); Pennsylvania trolley gauge

The PCC III is a series of upgraded PCC streetcars used by SEPTA in Philadelphia, Pennsylvania, for use on the SEPTA Metro G.

== History ==
=== 20th century ===
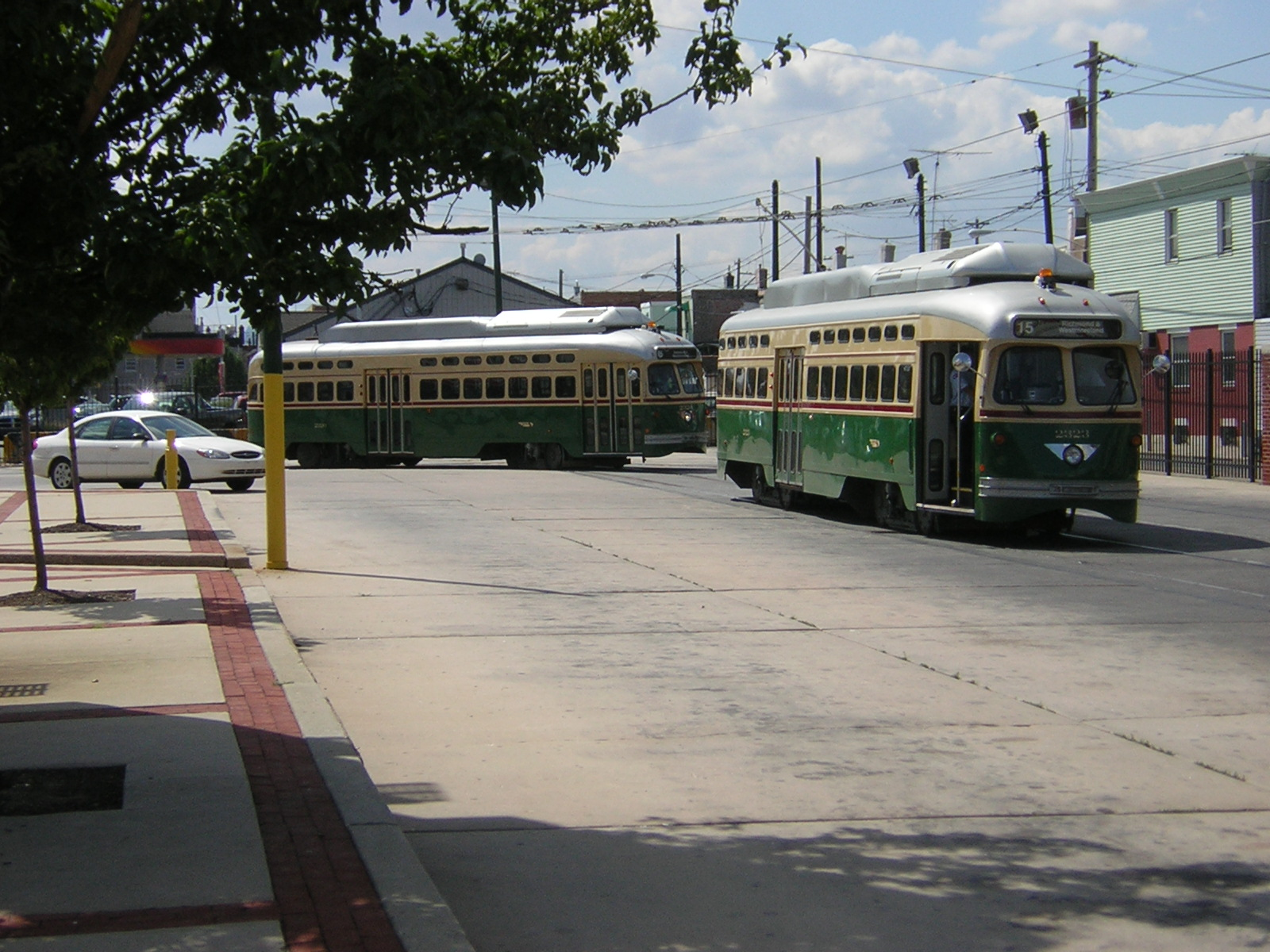
SEPTA PCC II cars, shortly after entering service on U.S. Route 15

In the 1980s, SEPTA was in the process of upgrading its subway–surface trolley lines, replacing its fleet of PCCs with new light rail cars. Some lines, such as Routes 6, 50, 53, and 60 were converted to buses, while Routes 15, 23, and 56 continued to use PCCs into the 1990s. In 1992, SEPTA ended streetcar service on these three lines as well. In response to public outcry over the conversion, SEPTA stated that the suspension of these lines' streetcar service was temporary, and that they would be restored in 1997. However, during this time little was done to restore the lines, and as 1997 approached, it became clear that SEPTA had no immediate plans to restore streetcar service to these lines.

In September 1997, at a City Council hearing, Jack Leary, SEPTA's general manager at the time, announced plans to restore streetcar service to only one of the three lines, Route 15. The initial proposal was to purchase twelve low-floor articulated light rail cars, to make some existing railcars available for the line. However, this was found to be prohibitively costly, and the decision was made instead to rehabilitate older cars for the service. SEPTA sent 18 of its retired PCC cars to the Brookville Equipment Company to be rebuilt, with another six to be used for parts.

=== 21st century ===
The first of the rebuilt PCC II cars debuted on September 9, 2003, and Route 15 was planned to open little under a year later. However, the line remained closed for another year due to disputes with local residents on 59th Street over parking on the street. During this time, the cars remained stored in the Callowhill depot, although they were occasionally used for special charters on the subway–surface routes. The cars entered full service on September 4, 2005.

By 2020, 14 of the 18 PCC II cars were unable to pass their internal mechanical inspections, thus prompting an early suspension of service on the Girard Avenue line to allow for refurbishments. Plans had called for a shorter disruption to accommodate track refurbishment and a highway expansion, but this was initiated early when the breadth of mechanical issues were discovered. As of 2024, rebuilding of the PCC II fleet into PCC III cars continues, with the first finished cars entering back into Route 15 service on June 16, 2024.

The PCC III fleet is projected to be replaced by 130 new low-floor trolleys to be built by Alstom. The new trolleys will be 80 feet in length and fully ADA-compliant, which the current PCC III fleet have been since their PCC II rebuild. The trolleys will be distributed among Route 15, the subway-surface trolley lines, and the Media–Sharon Hill Line. The first trolley is expected to be delivered from Alstom in the Spring of 2027, with the last trolley to be delivered some time in 2030. However, SEPTA does not plan on reconstructing the G for its Trolley Modernization Program until 2041 at the earliest.

== Design ==
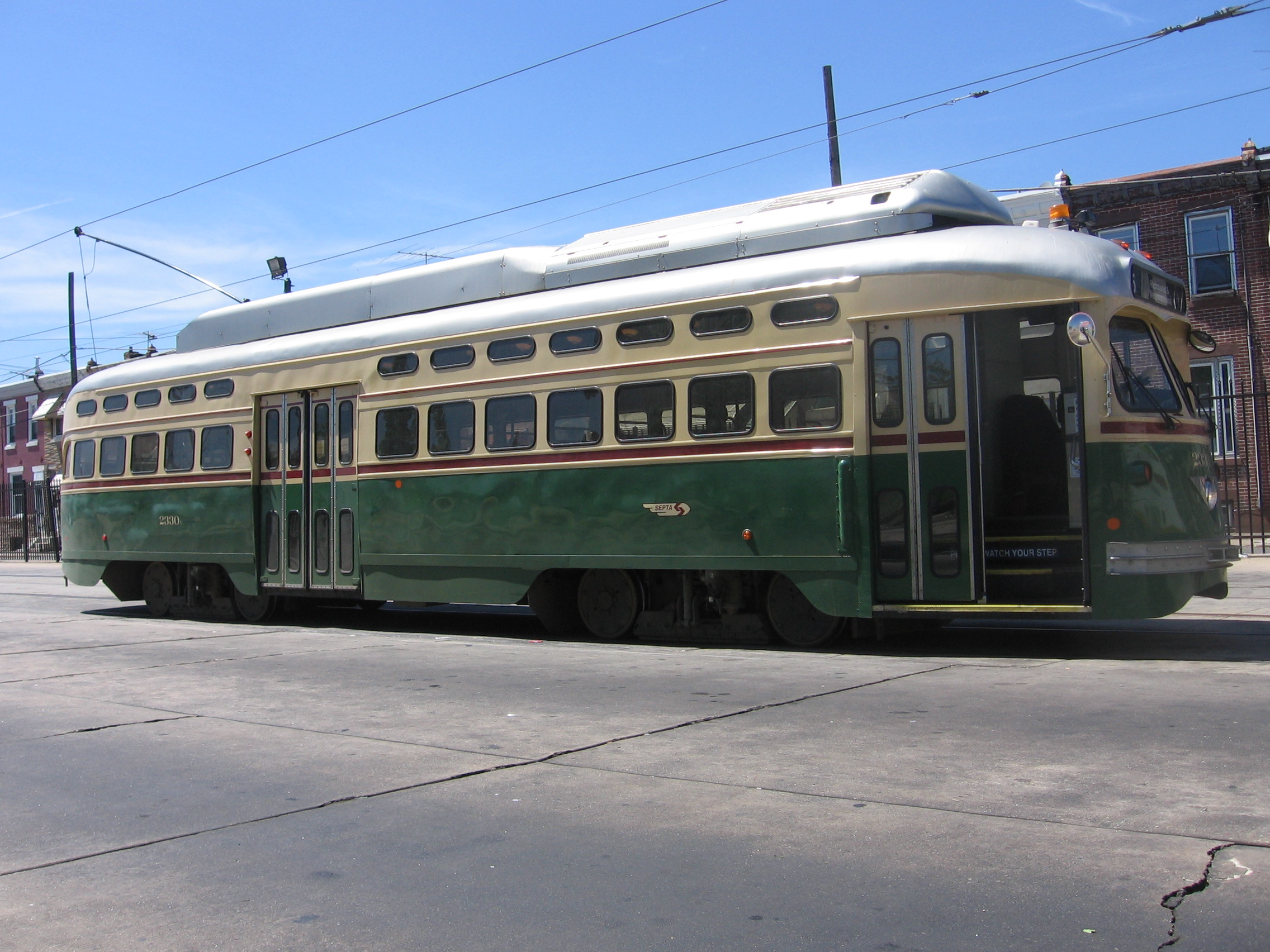
PCC II car at Richmond and Westmoreland loop

The PCC III is a completely new car built within an old PCC car's shell. All-new motors and brakes based on the PCC B3 truck design have been installed, as well as new air-conditioning units. The cars feature control consoles resembling those of SEPTA's modern Kawasaki light rail cars, as well as revised interiors with reused seats from retired SEPTA Volvo-built buses. Rollsigns have also been replaced with LED displays. In their initial rebuild into PCC IIs, the rear doorway was also widened to include a wheelchair lift, thus making the PCC IIs the first streetcars operated by SEPTA to be ADA-accessible.

The cars are painted in a unique green, red, and cream livery, nearly identical to that of the PCC cars of SEPTA's predecessor, the Philadelphia Transportation Company, as well as featuring a modified "wing" logo, which features the SEPTA "S" symbol in place of the "P-T-C" lettering.

== See also ==
- Port Authority 4000-series PCC
