= Berks station =

Rapid transit station in Philadelphia

Berks
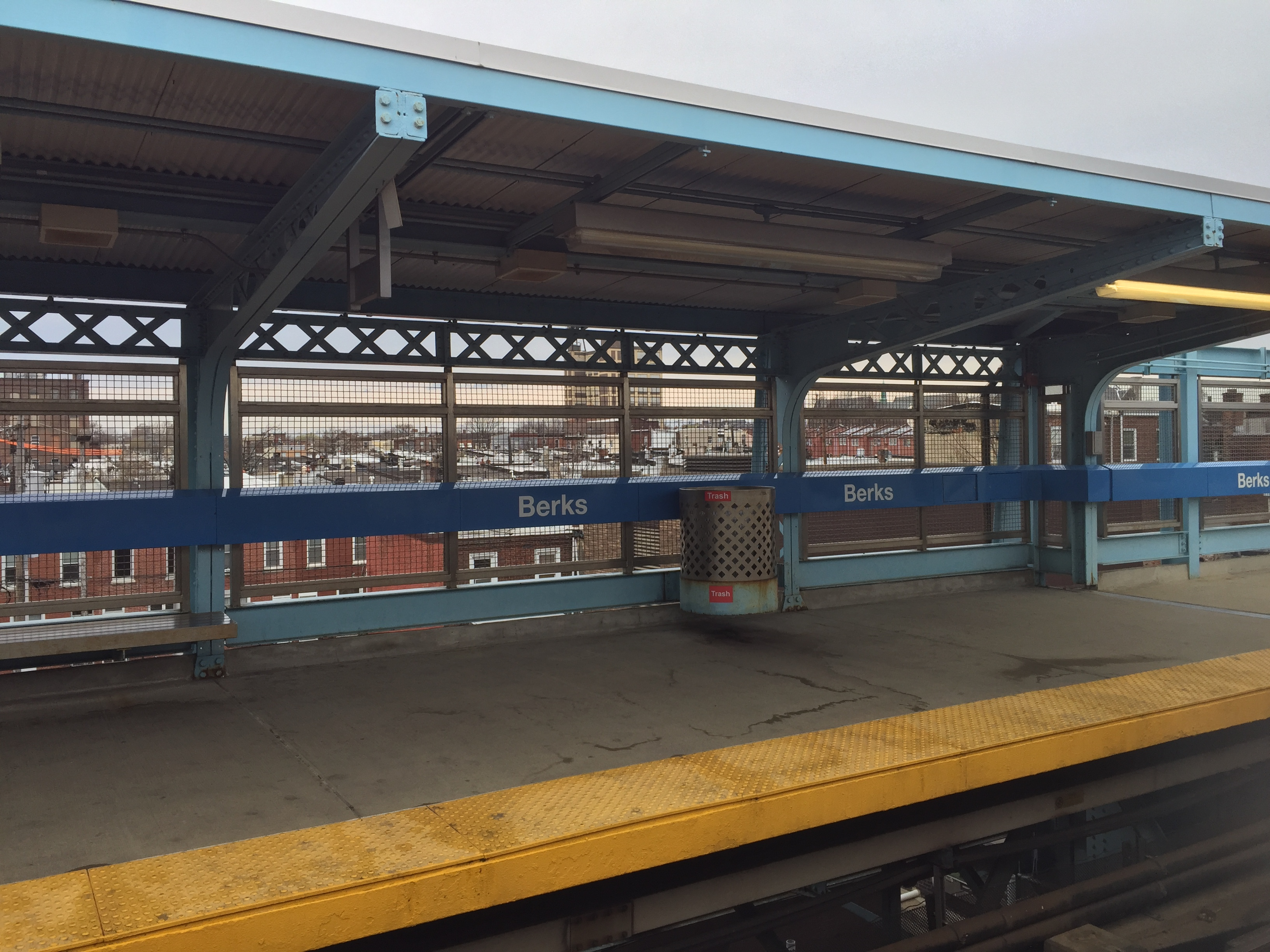
- Berks station platform

General information
- Location: 1900 North Front Street; Philadelphia, Pennsylvania
- Coordinates: 39°58′43″N 75°08′01″W
- Owner: City of Philadelphia
- Operator: SEPTA
- Platforms: 2 side platforms
- Tracks: 2
- Connections: SEPTA City Bus: 3

Construction
- Structure type: Elevated
- Accessible: Yes

History
- Opened: November 5, 1922
- Rebuilt: 1997

Services
| Preceding station | SEPTA Metro | Following station |
|---|---|---|
| Front–Girard toward 69th Street T.C. | L (SEPTA Metro) | York–Dauphin toward Frankford T.C. |
Route map
Location

Berks station is an elevated rapid transit station served by SEPTA Metro L trains, located at the corner of Front and Berks streets in the Kensington neighborhood of Philadelphia, Pennsylvania. The station is also served by SEPTA bus route 3.

== History ==
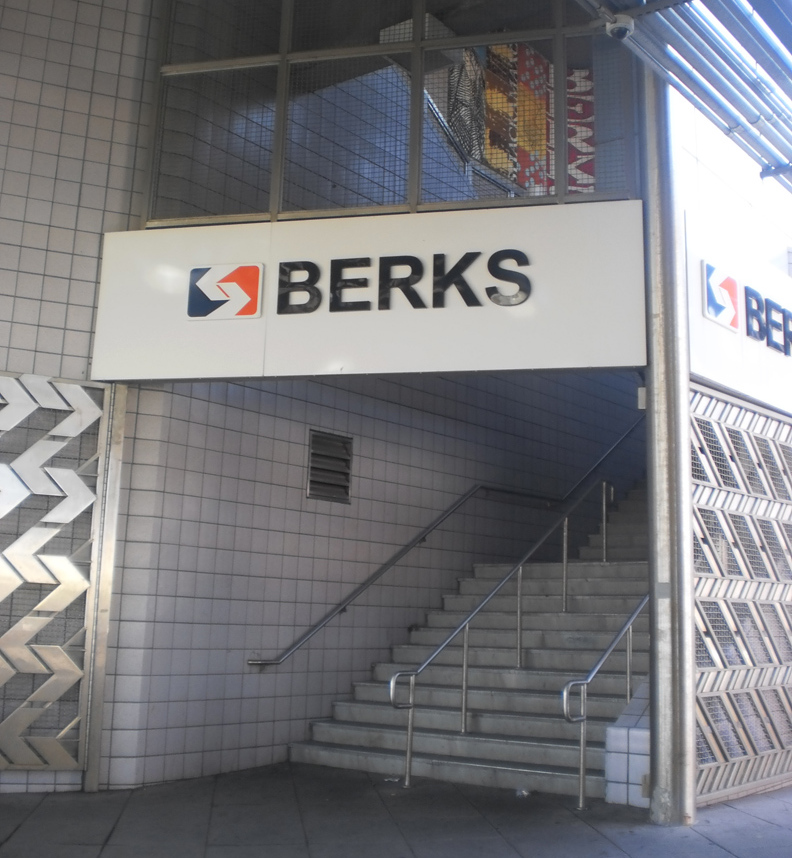
Station entrance

Berks is part of the Frankford Elevated section of the line, which began service on November 5, 1922.

Between 1988 and 2003, SEPTA undertook a $493.3 million reconstruction of the 5.5-mile (8.9 km) Frankford Elevated. Berks station was completely rebuilt on the site of the original station; the project included new platforms, elevators, windscreens, and overpasses, and the station now meets ADA accessibility requirements. The line had originally been built with track ballast and was replaced with precast sections of slab track, allowing the station (and the entire line) to remain open throughout the project.

During the Market–Frankford's rush-hour skip-stop service pattern, Berks was only served by "A" trains . This practice was discontinued on February 24, 2020.

== Station layout ==
The station has two tracks and two side platforms. Access to and from the station is via the southwest corner of Berks & Front streets. There is also an exit-only staircase from the eastbound platform to the east side of Front Street.

== In popular culture ==
In the film Maximum Risk, the station served as a stand-in for the New York City Subway Brighton Beach Station.
