= Track gauge in the United States =

Widths of railway tracks

Originally, various track gauges were used in the United States. Some railways, primarily in the northeast, used standard gauge of 4 ft 8 1/2 in (1,435 mm); others used gauges ranging from 2 ft (610 mm) to 6 ft (1,829 mm). As a general rule, southern railroads were built to one or another broad gauge, mostly 5 ft (1,524 mm), while northern railroads that were not standard-gauge tended to be narrow-gauge. The Pacific Railroad Acts of 1863 specified standard gauge be used for the first transcontinental railroad.

Notable exceptions were the 6 ft (1,829 mm) railroads that predominated in the first part of the 19th century in New York State, and the 5 ft 6 in (1,676 mm) lines centered on Portland, Maine. Problems began as soon as lines began to meet, and standard gauge was adopted in much of the northeastern United States. Standard gauge had spread widely across the country by the late 19th century except in some parts of the South; it was adopted there in a two-day changeover between May 31 and June 1, 1886.

Street railways used gauges that served local conditions and were rarely intended to connect with main line railways or any other roads. This meant that many of these systems were built with varying gauges. Interurban railroads tended to adopt the gauges of local streetcars.

Since the conversion in the 1880s, standard gauge is used almost everywhere in the U.S. Non-standard gauges remain in use only for some municipal and regional mass transit systems not requiring interchange of equipment.

== Broad gauges ==
=== 6 ft (1,829 mm) gauge ===
The New York and Erie Railroad was originally 6 ft (1,829 mm) gauge, and spawned a regional network of other six foot gauge railroads within New York State. Chartered in 1832, its first section opening in 1841, the Erie's promoters and early engineers believed it would be so busy that wider gauged tracks would be required for locomotives much larger (and therefore more powerful) than usual to pull the expected very long and heavy trains. 6 ft gauge was also cited for improved stability, and the New York and Erie eventually had rolling stock with 11 feet (3.35 m) wide loading gauge. Other railroads connecting to the Erie were soon built, able to interchange freight and passenger cars, forming a true regional six foot gauged railroad network across the southern tier of New York State from the Hudson River to the shores of Lake Erie.

Major cities including Rochester, Syracuse, Utica, and Albany all were connected by six foot gauged railroads extending from Elmira and Binghamton on the New York and Erie mainline. These lines included the Avon, Genesee & Mt. Morris, the Albany and Susquehanna (later part of the Delaware and Hudson), the Elmira, Jefferson & Canandaigua (later the Northern Central, becoming part of the Pennsylvania Railroad), the Rochester & Genesee Valley, the Canandaigua and Niagara Falls (initially Erie controlled, later part of the New York Central railroad's Peanut Route along the shoreline of Lake Ontario), and even the mainline of rival, and future (1960) merger partner, the Delaware, Lackawanna, and Western (The Lackawanna also had a significant portion of its six-foot gauge trackage in Pennsylvania and New Jersey). Other 6 ft gauge lines included the Syracuse, Binghamton & New York (later part of the Lackawanna), the Walkill Valley railroad (later part of the New York Central), and the Erie's own Newburgh branch. Between 1876 and 1880, most of the 6 ft lines converted to standard gauge, some having been first dual gauged with a third running rail allowing standard gauge trains to share the track, prior to the removal of the 6 ft rails.

=== 5 ft 6 in (1,676 mm) gauge ===
Portland gauge of 5 ft 6 in (1,676 mm) was used on the Grand Trunk Railway, Maine Central Railroad, and a system of connecting lines to funnel interior traffic through the port of Portland, Maine, in competition with the standard gauge railway system serving the port of Boston. The Portland Company was formed to build locomotives of this gauge for use on the local rail system. The gauge was known as "Texas gauge" while required by Texas law until 1875, and used by the New Orleans, Opelousas and Great Western Railroad (NOO&GW) until 1872, and by the Texas and New Orleans Railroad until 1876. The New England railways were similarly standard-gauged in the 1870s.

In the 1960s, the gauge was selected for use in the Bay Area Rapid Transit system (BART), serving the San Francisco Bay Area; it is the only place in the United States where this gauge is in use. The rapid transit segment of the system covers 109 miles (175 km) of double track in revenue service with additional sidings and maintenance facilities.

=== 5 ft 4 1/2 in (1,638 mm) gauge ===
Sometimes referred to as Baltimore gauge, due to that city's required streetcar gauge. It was utilized by the local United Railways and Electric Company in its streetcar system, which went on to see service under MTA Maryland. This gauge is preserved at the Baltimore Streetcar Museum.

=== Pennsylvania trolley gauges ===
The 5 ft 2 1/2 in (1,588 mm) and 5 ft 2 1/4 in (1,581 mm) gauges are interchangeably known as Pennsylvania trolley gauge after the common application in that state. Unlike other broad gauges in the United States, it has an unbroken history of utilization in a number of urban rail transit systems.

==== 5 ft 2 1/2 in (1,588 mm) ====
- Cincinnati (1859–1951; standard gauge 2016–present)
- Key West Street Car Company
- New Orleans
- Pittsburgh Light Rail
- West Penn Railways (1904–1952, defunct)
- SEPTA Metro (Philadelphia):
  - SEPTA Metro's D line uses a slighter larger wheel profile for their cars, but the same track gauge.

=== 5 ft 2 in (1,575 mm) gauge ===
This was a common street railway gauge in the eastern United States. It was variously utilized on the following railways:

- Columbus, Ohio
  - Columbus, New Albany and Johnstown Traction Company
  - Columbus Railway, Power & Lighting Company
- Trenton and Mercer County Traction Corporation
- West Chester, Kennett and Wilmington Electric Railway
- Westmoreland County Railway

=== 5 ft (1,524 mm) gauge ===
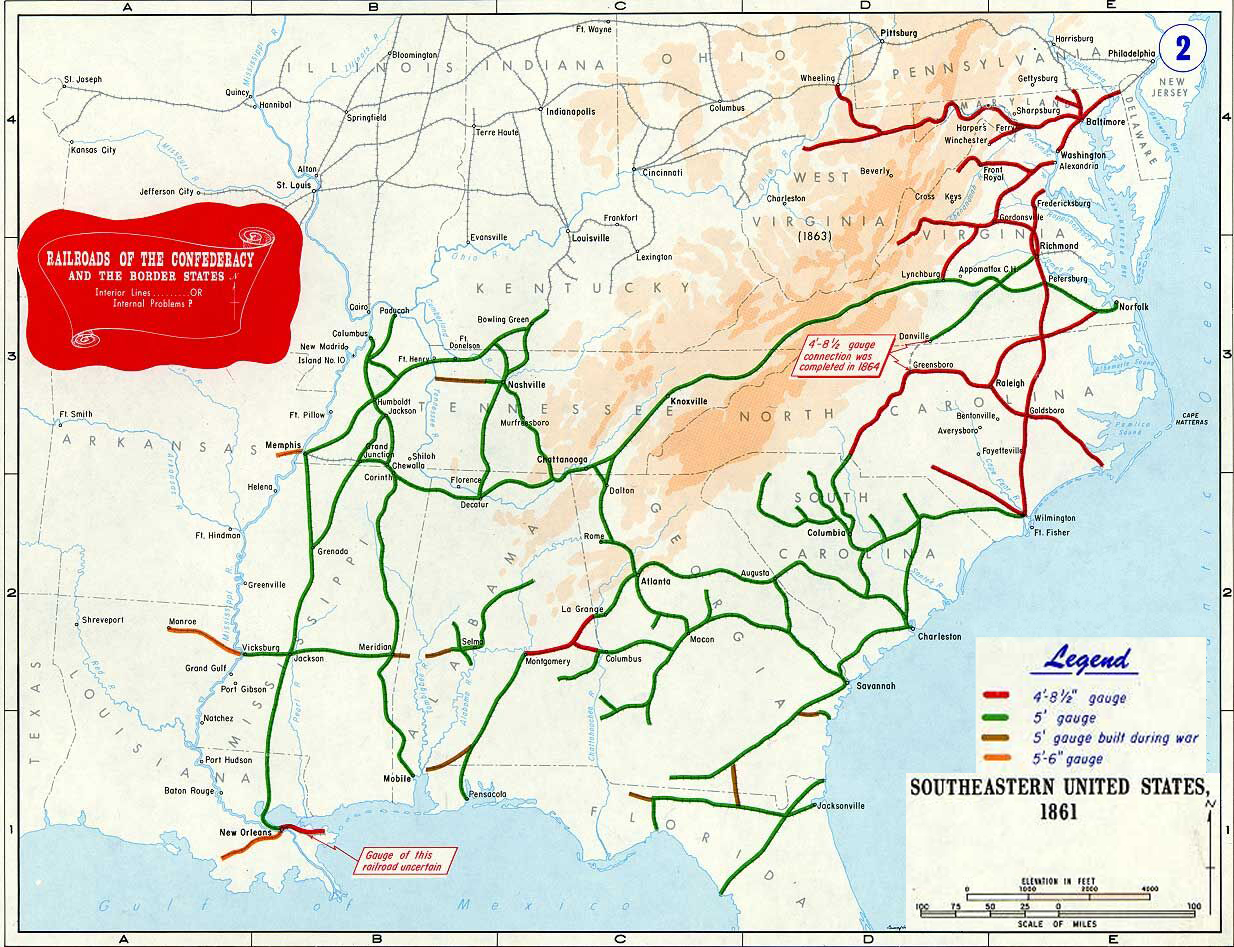
Map of rail gauges used in Confederate and border states, 5 ft (1,524 mm) in green

In most of the southern states, the 5 ft (1,524 mm) gauge was preferred. This configuration allowed for wider rolling stock that could more efficiently accommodate cotton bales, the most commonly transported good in the South at the time. In the U.S. this gauge was changed to 4 ft 9 in (1,448 mm) in 1886. This gauge remains in use by Pittsburgh's two funicular railways, the Monongahela Incline (the oldest continuously operating funicular in the United States, having opened in 1870) and the Duquesne Incline.

=== 4 ft 10 in (1,473 mm) gauge ===
The 4 foot 10 inch gauge may have been the result of specifying a 5-foot (1,524 mm) center-to-center spacing of 2-inch (51 mm) tracks. This gauge was first used in New Jersey in 1832 with the Camden and Amboy Railroad. As demand for more direct travel to New York City grew, the gauge was further utilized by several connecting railroads in New Jersey. Most of the original track in Ohio was built in this gauge, so much that it would become known as Ohio gauge. This was also the gauge adopted locally for streetcars in St. Louis.

== Narrow gauges ==
=== 4 ft 8 1/4 in (1,429 mm) gauge ===
The Washington Metro system in the D.C. metropolitan area was built with a 4 ft 8 1/4 in (1,429 mm) gauge, but is not narrow gauge in the traditional sense and is within the tolerance of standard gauge.

=== 4 ft 8 in (1,422 mm) gauge ===
The world's first operational mountain-climbing cog railway (rack-and-pinion railway), the Mount Washington Cog Railway in Coos County, New Hampshire — in operation since its opening in 1869 — uses a 4 ft 8 inch (1,422 mm) rail gauge, as designed by Sylvester Marsh, the creator of the Marsh rack system for ensuring firm traction going up and down the slopes of the highest mountain in New England.

=== 4 ft (1,219 mm) gauge ===
The 4 ft (1,219 mm) gauge was utilized for street railways in some cities, which would go on to be adopted by connecting interurbans. Operators utilizing this gauge included:

- Arkansas Valley Railway, Light and Power Company
- Canton and Massillon Electric Railway
- Honolulu Rapid Transit and Land Company
- San Antonio, San Jose and Medina Valley Interurban
- San Antonio Public Service Company

=== 3 ft 6 in (1,067 mm) gauge ===
The San Francisco cable cars use the Cape Gauge of 3 ft 6 in (1,067 mm), as did the Los Angeles Railway and the San Diego Electric Railway until 1898. Several western streetcar systems additionally adopted the gauge. The gauge is still widely used in the U.S. mining industry.

=== 3 ft (914 mm) gauge ===
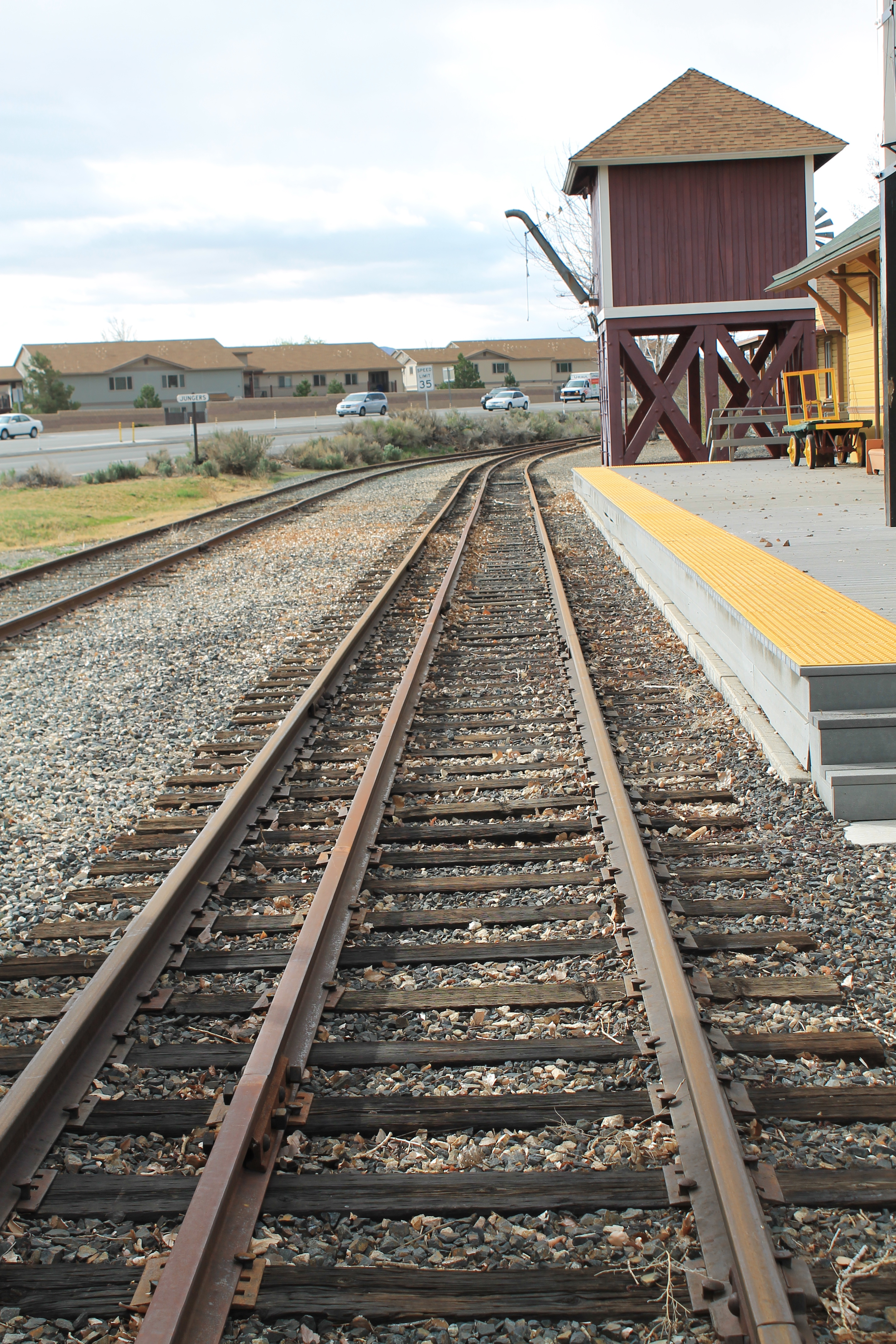
Dual-gauge track at the Nevada State Railroad Museum: standard and 3 ft (914 mm)

The dominant narrow gauge throughout the United States became the 3 ft (914 mm) gauge, largely popularized after the success of the Denver and Rio Grande Railway. The gauge would see wide adoption around the 1870s and 1880s from the Boston, Revere Beach and Lynn Railroad of Massachusetts to the Pacific Coast Railway of California. The gauge was also used by the Oahu Railway and Land Company of Hawaii, the White Pass and Yukon Route of Alaska and the East Broad Top Railroad of Pennsylvania, which operates as of 2022. Heritage railroads operate portions of the formerly extensive Colorado system as the Durango and Silverton Narrow Gauge Railroad and Cumbres and Toltec Scenic Railroad.

=== 2 ft 6 in (762 mm) gauge ===
The Angels Flight and Court Flight funicular railways of Los Angeles used 2 ft 6 in (762 mm). The gauge was also used for the Yosemite Short Line Railway, the Pacific Coast Steamship Company's horse-powered tramway near Pismo Beach, California, Michigan's Harbor Springs Railway, and several Hawaiian sugar plantation railways. This became a popular gauge for heritage railways in California, Florida, Hawaii, Minnesota, Montana, Nebraska, Oregon, and Pennsylvania.

=== 2 ft (610 mm) gauge ===
Several Maine railroads used 2 ft (610 mm) gauge following demonstration on the Billerica and Bedford Railroad in 1877, including the Sandy River and Rangeley Lakes Railroad, the Wiscasset, Waterville and Farmington Railway, the Kennebec Central, the Monson Railroad, and the Bridgton and Saco River Railroad. When these railroads ceased operation in the 1930s and 1940s, much of their equipment was transferred to the Edaville Railroad, which, as of 2019, remains in operation as one of the oldest American heritage railroads. Also as of 2019, the Maine Narrow Gauge Railroad Museum; Sandy River and Rangeley Lakes Railroad; Wiscasset, Waterville and Farmington Railway; and Boothbay Railway Village also continue to operate old Maine 2 ft (610 mm) gauge equipment.

The gauge was also used by the Mount Gretna Narrow Gauge Railway in Pennsylvania, and by some mining railways of the Rocky Mountains. Similar 600 mm (1 ft 11 5/8 in) gauge equipment, which was originally manufactured for the trench railways of World War I, was used on United States military bases in Alabama, Georgia, Indiana, New Jersey, and Oklahoma through World War II; and sold as military surplus for earth-moving construction through the 1920s.

== Towards standardization ==
In the early days of rail transport in the United States, railroads tended to be built out of coastal cities into the rural interior and hinterland or as a method to connect to major waterways and systems did not connect. Each railroad was free to choose its own gauge, although imported British engineering practices would encourage some railroads to be built to Stephenson gauge of 4 feet 8 1/2 inches based on their previous experiences. Many American engineers, however, based their choice of gauges only on the roughly reported British notion that tracks be spaced "about five feet apart", leading to several close, but largely incompatible, gauges in the early years of American railroading. Engineering wisdom of the day had encouraged a wider track width to overcome some perceived shortcomings of standard gauge, and railways in New York and the South would be built to broad gauges based on this notion. When American railroad tracks extended to the point that they began to interconnect, it became clear that a single nationwide gauge would be beneficial. By the 1860s, the eastern United States featured nine different rail regions separated by breaks of gauge, and even service within a particular region may have lacked a sense of network integration.

To overcome that problem, several methods were devised to route freight and passengers. Mixed gauge tracks were in service starting in 1857. Variable width axles with separate connection points for wheels were attempted but ultimately found faulty. Special compromise cars were able to run 4 ft 10 in (1,473 mm) and standard gauge track, though engineering tolerances of tracks at that time made this setup less than ideal. The Ramsey car-transfer apparatus attempted to solve this issue by streamlining the replacement of entire bogies on rail cars to run on different gauges.

=== Gauge war ===
In Erie, Pennsylvania, the 6 ft (1,829 mm) Erie Railroad terminated while adjacent railroads used 4 ft 10 in (1,473 mm) gauge, also known as "Ohio gauge." That led to the Erie Gauge War in 1853–54, when the Erie mayor and citizens temporarily prevented a gauge standardization, because there would then be less trans-shipping work and through passengers would no longer have a stopover at Erie.

=== Pacific Railway Act of 1863 ===
Break of gauge would prove to be a nightmare during the American Civil War (1861–65), often hindering the Confederacy's ability to move goods efficiently over long distances. The Pacific Railway Act of March 3, 1863, specified that the federally funded transcontinental railroad was to use standard gauge, which helped to further popularize it among American railroads, although the standard gauge was already in use on many other lines prior to 1863. California's nascent railway network toward the east was initially built with a 5 ft (1,524 mm) gauge, but was quickly converted to standard to provide interchanges with the Pacific Railroad.

=== "Narrow gauge fever" ===
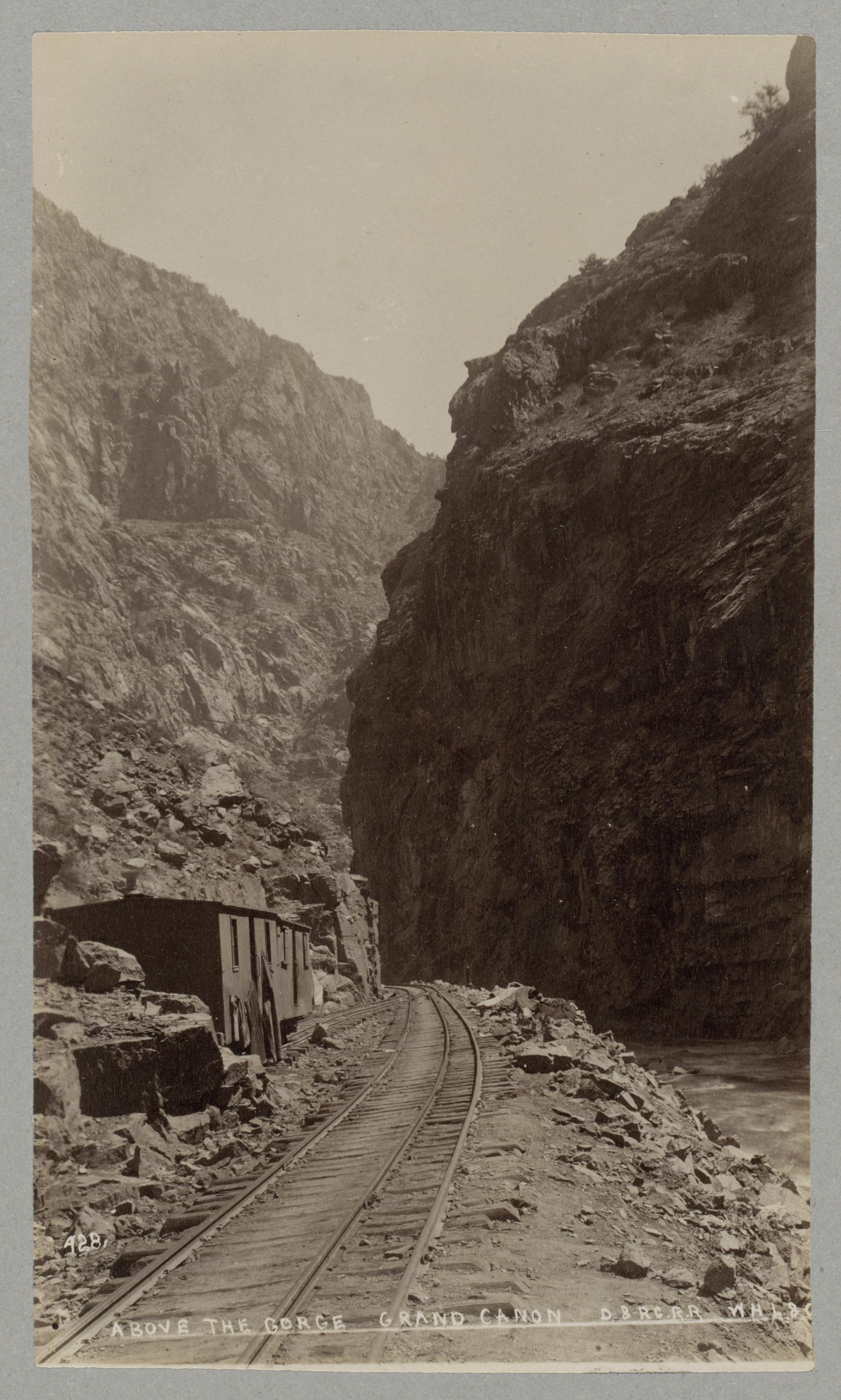
The Denver and Rio Grande Railway line with dual gauge track. The railway's success was initially attributed in part to the narrow gauge construction.

As the national rail network matured, railroaders sought cheaper methods of construction in order to supply more locations with rail transport. Some narrow-gauge coal railways opened in the late 1860s, but the Denver and Rio Grande Railway, opened in 1871, was the first to explicitly base its design on new theories of lighter construction, including utilizing a 3 ft (914 mm) gauge. This would go on to become the most established gauge among narrow gauge routes, with over 95% of peak track mileage built to this width. Early ambitions of these new railroads were to eventually connect to form their own comprehensive network and obviate the need to interchange freight with the established standard gauge system, though this would not come to fruition and the narrow gauge railroads served as a series of several regional railroads. Promoters would refer to the Denver and Rio Grande as an example of the efficacy of the principle. The sudden proliferation of these beliefs were somewhat derisively referred to at the time as "narrow gauge fever". By 1876, narrow gauge construction in the United States comprised 35% of all rail construction, though the weak economy of that decade led to lower construction quality for new railroads. The failure of the Grand Narrow Gauge Trunk in the mid-1880s was seen as proof that narrow gauge railroad practices were not suitable for competing with standard gauge roads. Mileage of narrow gauge peaked in 1887 with 11,699 miles (18,828 km) in service. Conversion to standard gauge was much slower than the South's efforts in eliminating their broad gauge, with 7,000 miles (11,000 km) of narrow track in operation in 1902 and 2,000 miles (3,200 km) still operating in 1937. By 2009, only 46 miles (74 km) of common carrier railroad utilized a narrow gauge, with about 2/3 of all narrow gauge line in the United States having been converted to standard and the rest abandoned. Several tourist railroads continued to utilize narrow gauges.

=== Pressure for standardization ===
Following the Civil War, trade between the South and North grew sufficiently large that the break of gauge became a major economic nuisance, impeding through shipments. Competitive pressures induced most North American railways to convert to standard gauge by 1880, but Southern railroads retained their distinct, 5 ft (1,524 mm) gauge. Two important railroads connecting Chicago to the South converted to standard gauge on their own, increasing pressure on competing and connecting lines to do the same. These were the Illinois Central in 1881 and the Mobile and Ohio Railroad in 1885.

=== Unification to standard gauge on May 31–June 1, 1886 ===
In 1886, the southern railroads agreed to coordinate changing gauge on all their tracks. After considerable debate and planning, most of the southern rail network was converted from 5 ft (1,524 mm) gauge to 4 ft 9 in (1,448 mm) gauge, then the standard of the Pennsylvania Railroad, over two days beginning on Monday, May 31, 1886. Over a period of 36 hours, tens of thousands of workers pulled the spikes from the west rail of all the broad gauge lines in the South, moved them 3 in (76 mm) east and spiked them back in place. To facilitate the change, the inside spikes had been hammered into place at the new gauge in advance. It was estimated that 14,000 miles (23,000 km) of track would be converted by June 2, with an additional 2,000 miles (3,200 km) of branch lines done by the end of the week. The new gauge was close enough that standard gauge equipment could run on it without problem. Rolling stock was altered to fit the new gauge at shops and rendezvous points throughout the South. That month, all major railroads in North America were using approximately the same gauge. The final conversion to true standard gauge took place gradually as part of routine track maintenance. In modern times, the only broad-gauge rail tracks in the United States are on some city transit systems.

== Effects of the Southern gauge change ==
Using historical freight traffic records, research from 2016 showed that the conversion to standard gauge instigated a large shift of North–South freight traffic away from coastal steamships to all-rail carriage. These effects were especially strong on short routes, where breaks in gauge were more expensive relative to the total cost and duration of carriage. However, the data indicate that the gauge change had no effect on total shipments, likely as a result of anti-competitive conduct by Southern freight carriers that prevented the railroads' cost-savings from being passed through to their prices. This research suggests that had Southern carriers not been colluding, the gauge change would have generated a sharp reduction in freight rates and immediate growth in trade between the North and South.

== See also ==
- List of track gauges
