= SEPTA Metro =

Rail transit network around Philadelphia

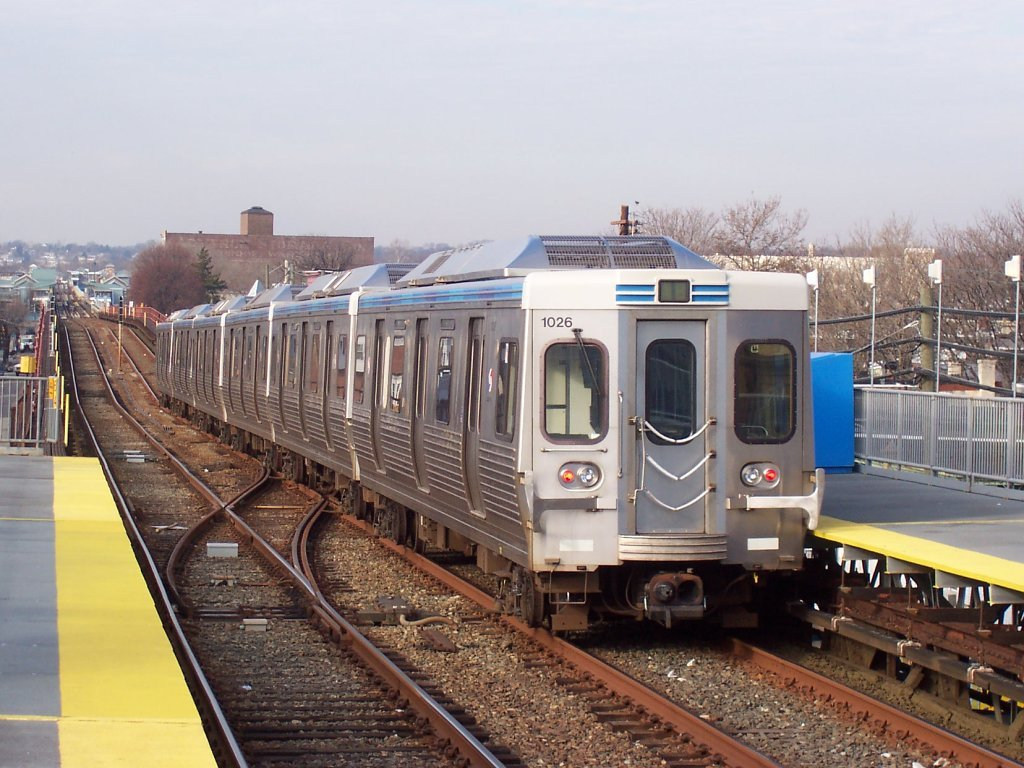
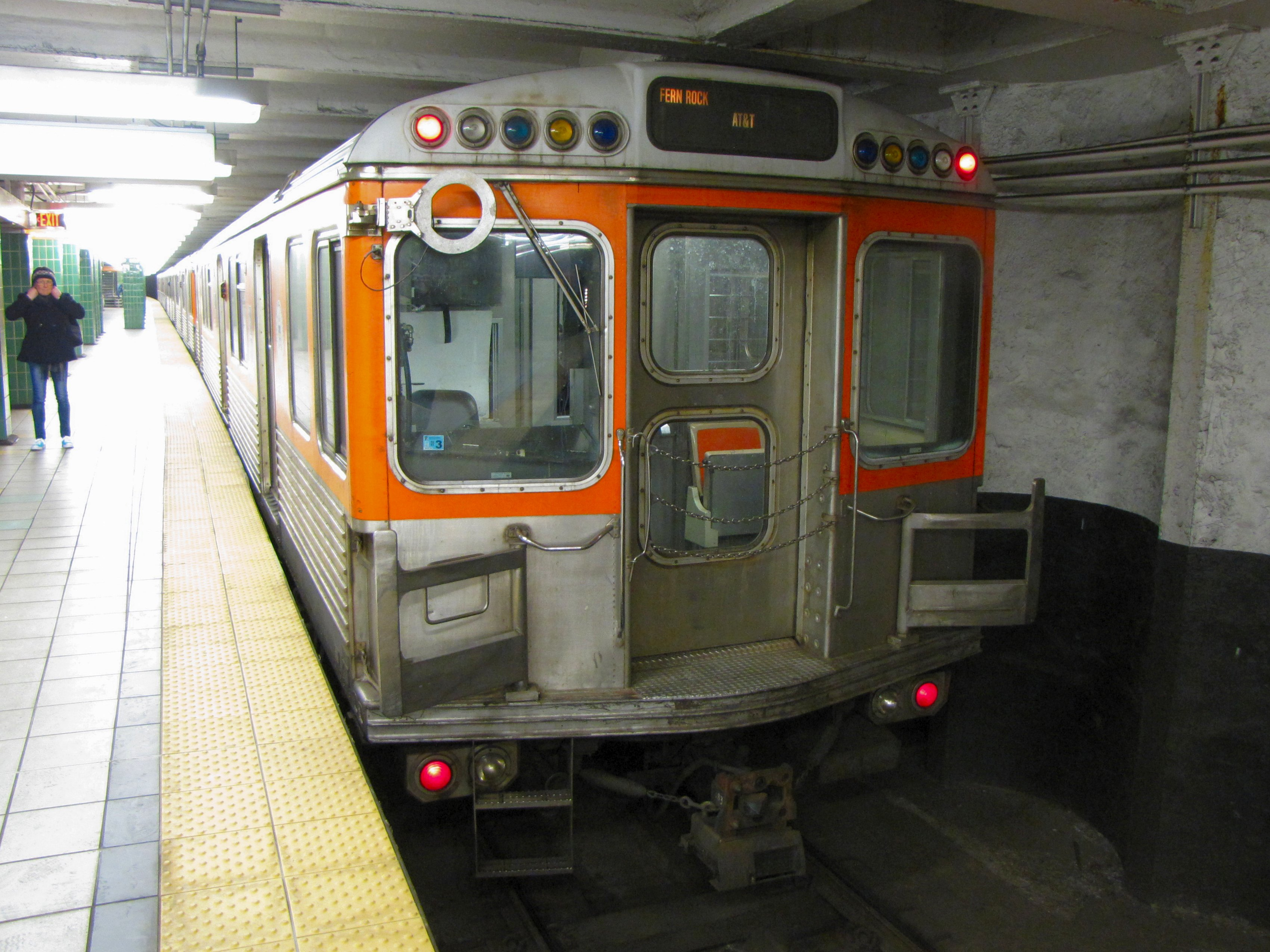
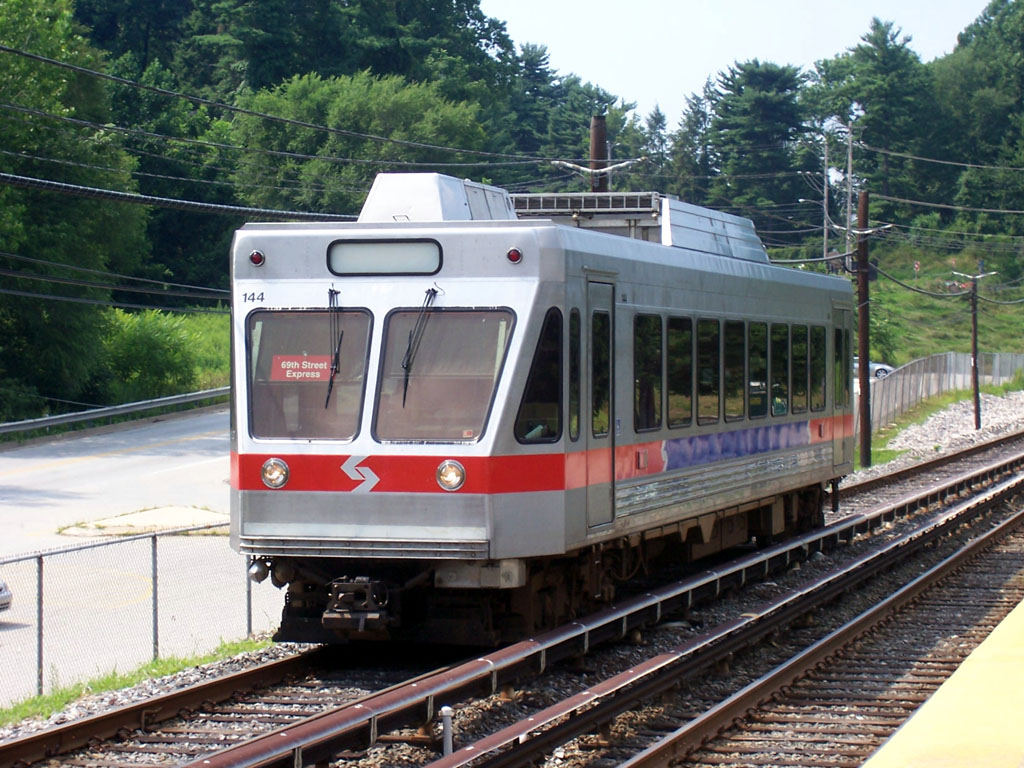
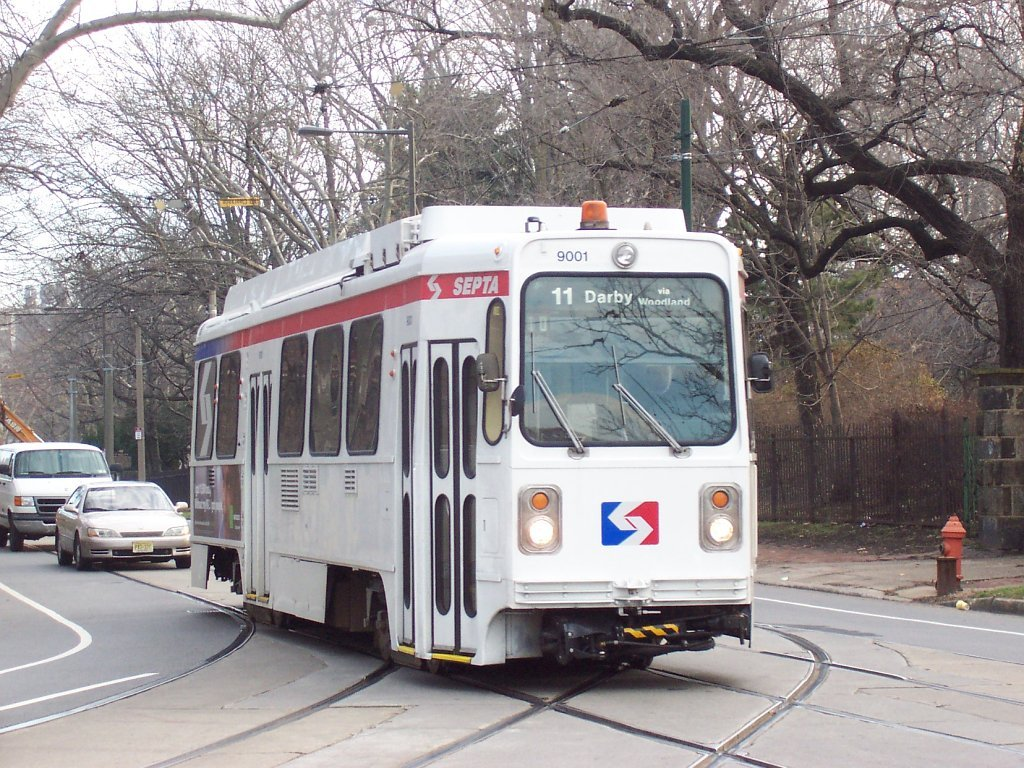
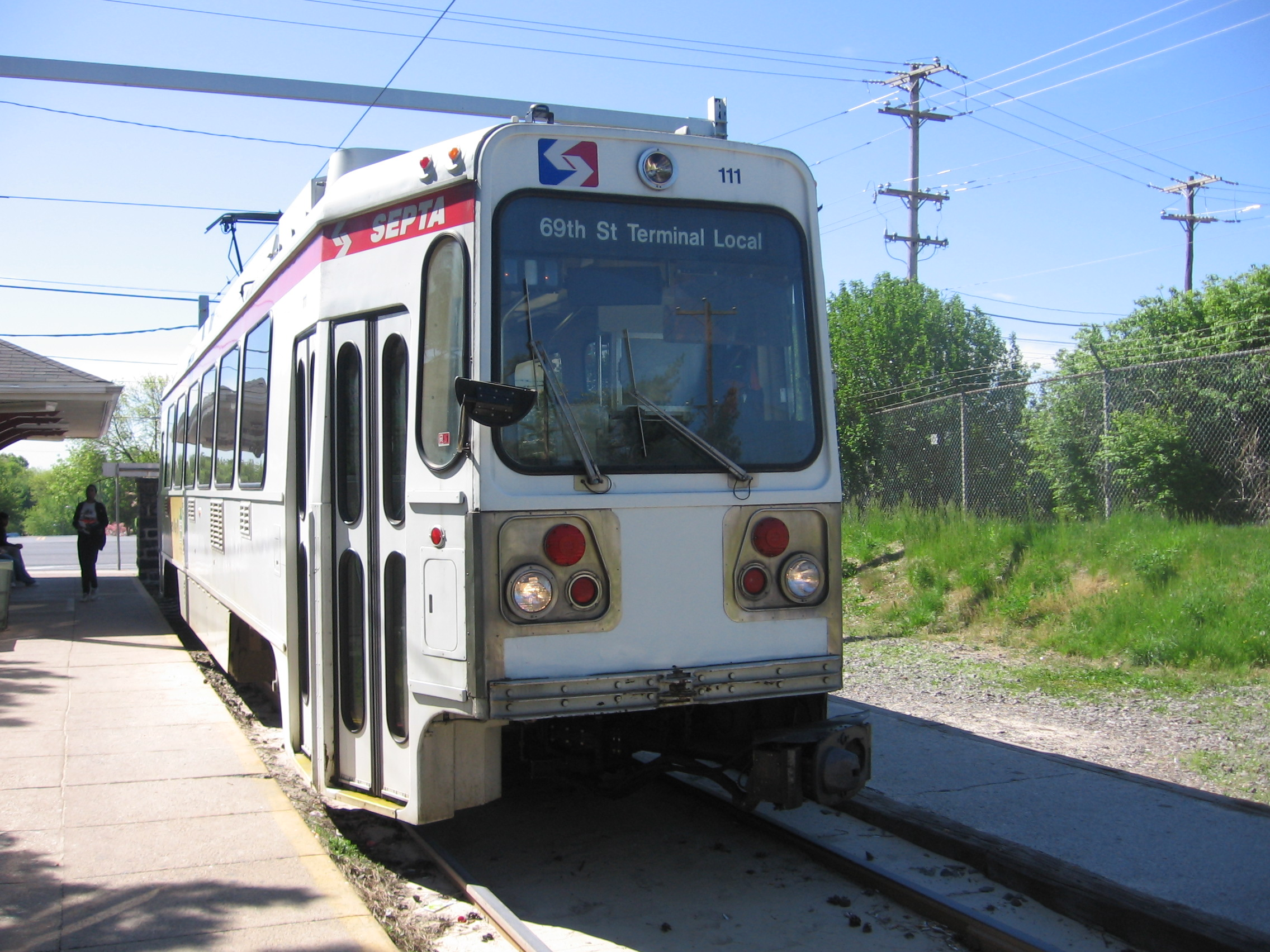
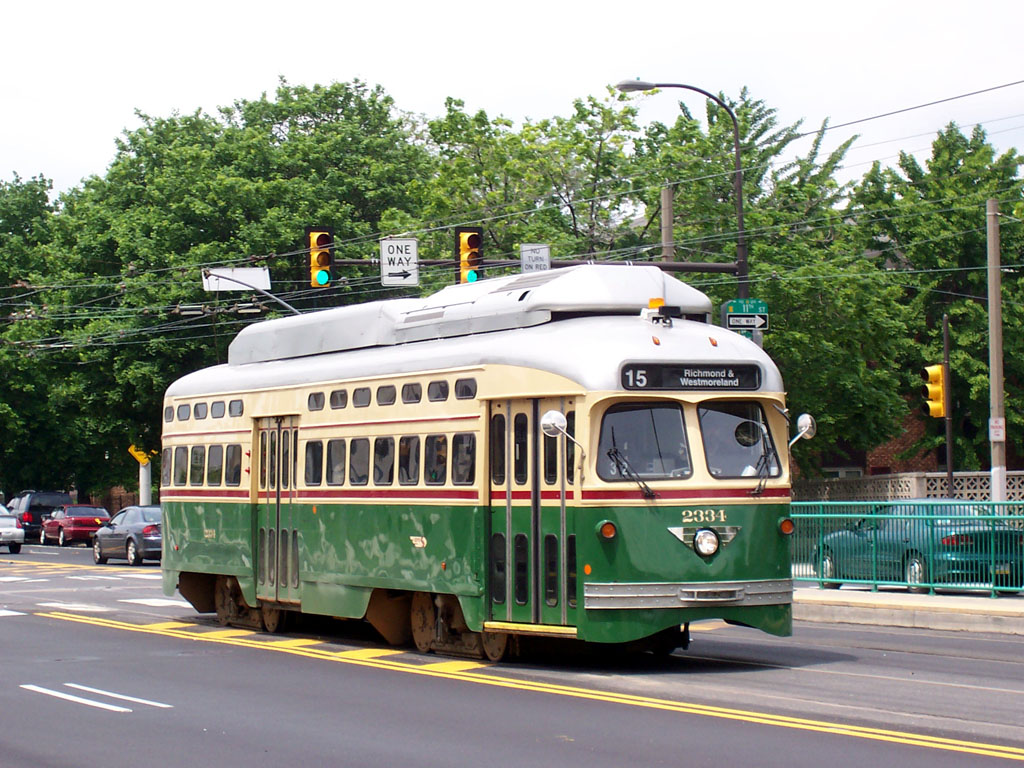
- Clockwise from top left: Trains on the L, B, T, G, D, and M.

Overview
- Owner: SEPTA
- Area served: Philadelphia, Delaware, and Montgomery Counties, Pennsylvania
- Locale: Philadelphia metropolitan area
- Transit type: Rapid transit (L, B); Light rail (T, D); Streetcar (G); Light metro (M)
- Number of lines: 6
- Daily ridership: 260,724 (FY 2025) (Note: Average weekday ridership)
- Annual ridership: 80,471,533 (FY 2025)
- Headquarters: 1234 Market Street, Philadelphia, Pennsylvania, U.S.
- Website: wwww.septa.org/metro/

Operation
- Infrastructure managers: SEPTA; City of Philadelphia

Technical
- System length: 78 mi (126 km)
- Track gauge: 4 ft 8 1/2 in (1,435 mm) standard gauge; 5 ft 2 1/2 in (1,588 mm) Pennsylvania trolley gauge
- Electrification: Overhead line, 600 V DC (T, G, D); Third rail, 700 V DC (L, B, M)
System map
Key

SEPTA Metro is an urban rail transit network in and around Philadelphia, Pennsylvania, United States, operated by the Southeastern Pennsylvania Transportation Authority (SEPTA). The network includes two rapid transit lines, a light rail system with five branches, a streetcar line, a light rail line with two services, and a light metro line, totaling 78 miles (126 km) (Note: Network mileage is calculated from one-way route mileage listed under "LRV" [41 miles (66 km)], "NHSL" [13 miles (21 km)], "MFSE" 13 miles (21 km), and "BSS" [11 miles (18 km)]) of rail service.

Although some of Philadelphia's transit lines date to the 19th century and the SEPTA agency began operations in 1965, the transit network itself had no formal name until 2024, when it was named "SEPTA Metro" as part of an effort to make the system easier to navigate. The effort replaced each line's name with a single letter, plus a number to denote various service patterns.

== History ==
=== 19th century ===
SEPTA Metro dates back to 1859 when the Pennsylvania General Assembly chartered the Richmond and Schuylkill River Passenger Railway. This line—now known as the G—commenced operations in July 1859, connecting Second Street to 31st Street along Girard Avenue. Following financial restructuring, the line reorganized as the Fairmount Park and Delaware River Passenger Railway in 1864 before merging with the Germantown Passenger Railway in 1866.

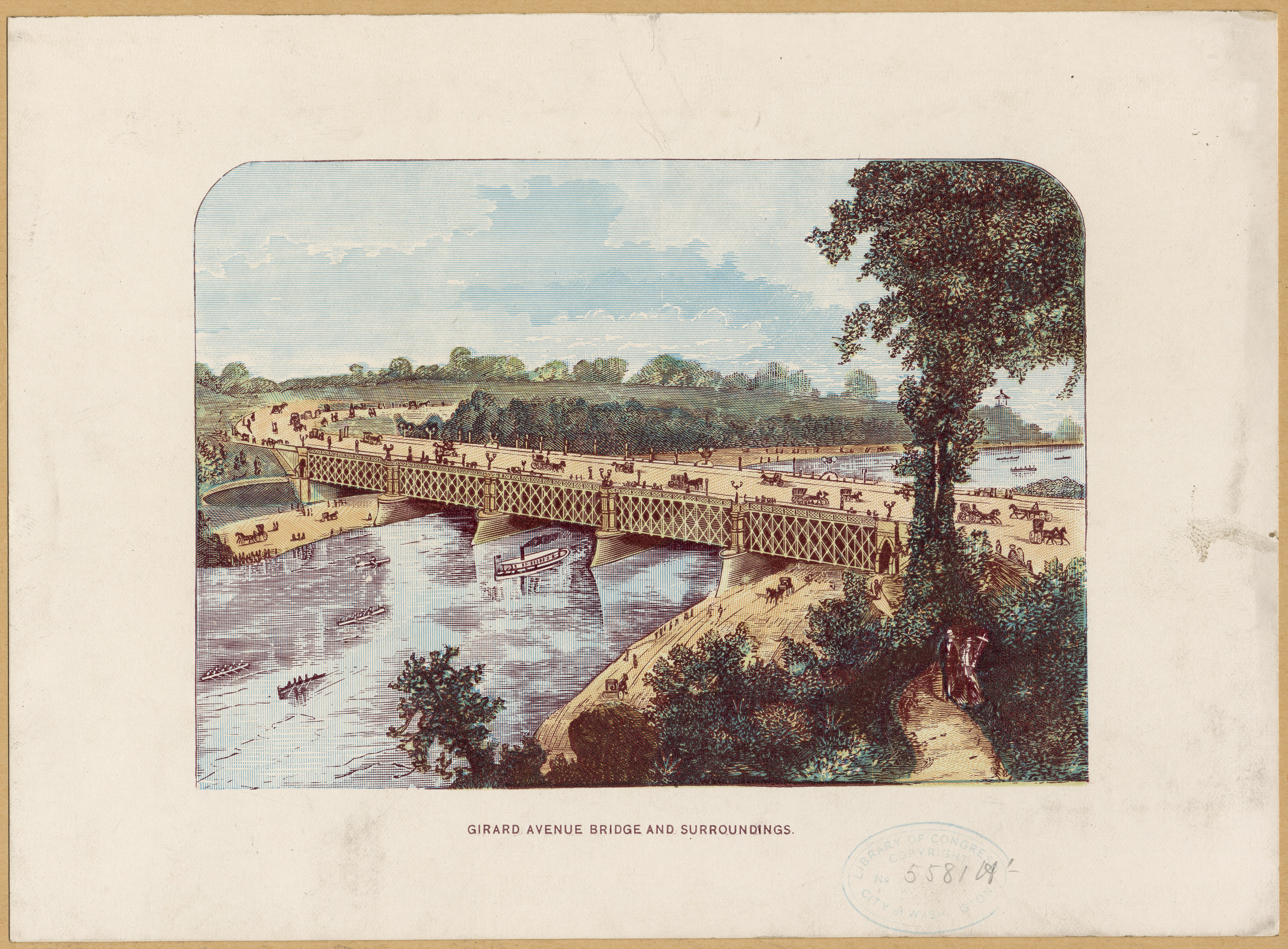
Girard Avenue Bridge and surroundings in 1877.

The network continued to expand as the nineteenth century progressed. The People's Passenger Railway leased the line in 1881, extending service west to 60th Street by 1900. In 1896, the Union Traction Company assumed control of the line by leasing the People's Passenger Railway.

In 1895, horse-drawn vehicles were replaced by electrified streetcars. The early 20th century witnessed the extension of Girard Avenue streetcars west to 63rd Street and east to Allegheny Avenue in 1903, incorporating the former Electric Traction Company Bridesburg Line on Richmond Street.

Trolley service continued to expand into Philadelphia's suburbs. In 1895, the Philadelphia and West Chester Traction Company inaugurated a trolley line (now Route 104) along West Chester Pike. In 1902, service was launched to Ardmore by the Ardmore and Llanerch Street Railway (now Route 103). Suburban trolley expansion continued with the opening of the Sharon Hill Line (now D2) in 1906. In 1907, the Philadelphia and Western Railroad inaugurated service from 69th Street Transportation Center to Strafford, forming parts of what would eventually become the M.

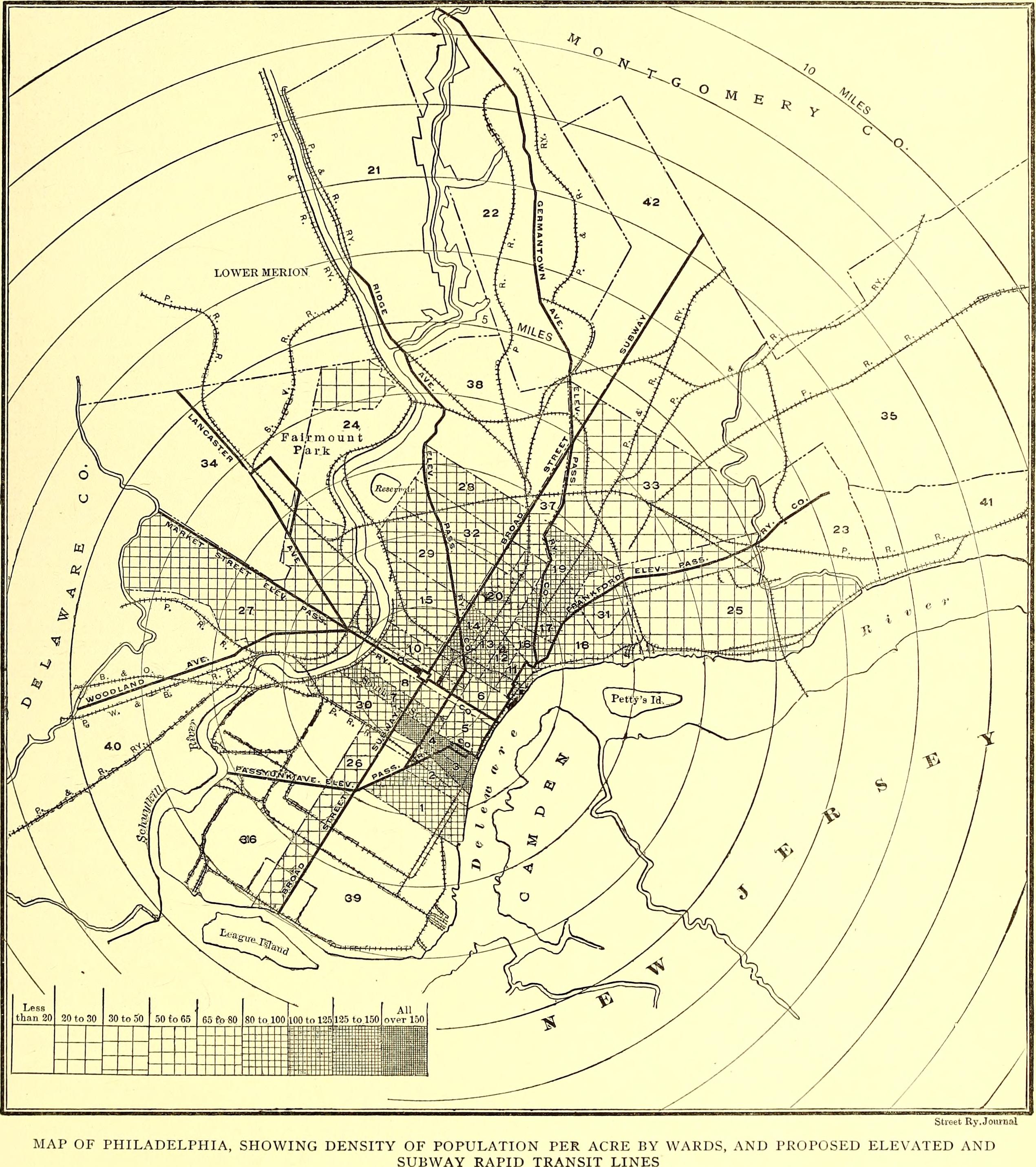
Philadelphia population density map (1905) with the proposed subway and elevated transit network overlaid.

=== 20th century ===
Authorization for the construction of rapid transit lines in Philadelphia was granted by the Pennsylvania General Assembly in 1901 through legislation permitting the construction of both subway and elevated railways within the city.

On March 4, 1907, Philadelphia's first rapid transit service was launched with the opening of the Market Street Line along Market Street. The service ran between 69th Street Terminal and City Hall. The system featured an elevated structure west of the Schuylkill River and a subway tunnel east of the river. Philadelphia was unusual in that the construction of its initial downtown subway was undertaken using Philadelphia Rapid Transit Company private capital with no contribution from public funds.

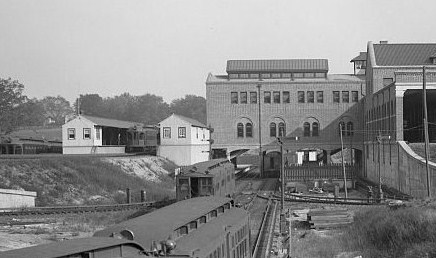
Philadelphia and Western platforms behind 69th Street Terminal in 1908.

Expansion proceeded rapidly, with the Market Street Line extending east to 2nd Street in August 1908 and reaching the Delaware River the following month. October 1908 saw the opening of the Delaware Avenue Elevated (Ferry Line), extending service to South Street. The total cost of the Market Street subway and elevated system amounted to $23,072,114 (equivalent to about $826,750,800 in 2025).

The suburban trolley network continued its growth with the opening of the Media Line (now D1) in April 1913. That same year, the Norristown branch of the Philadelphia and Western Railroad was fully operational.

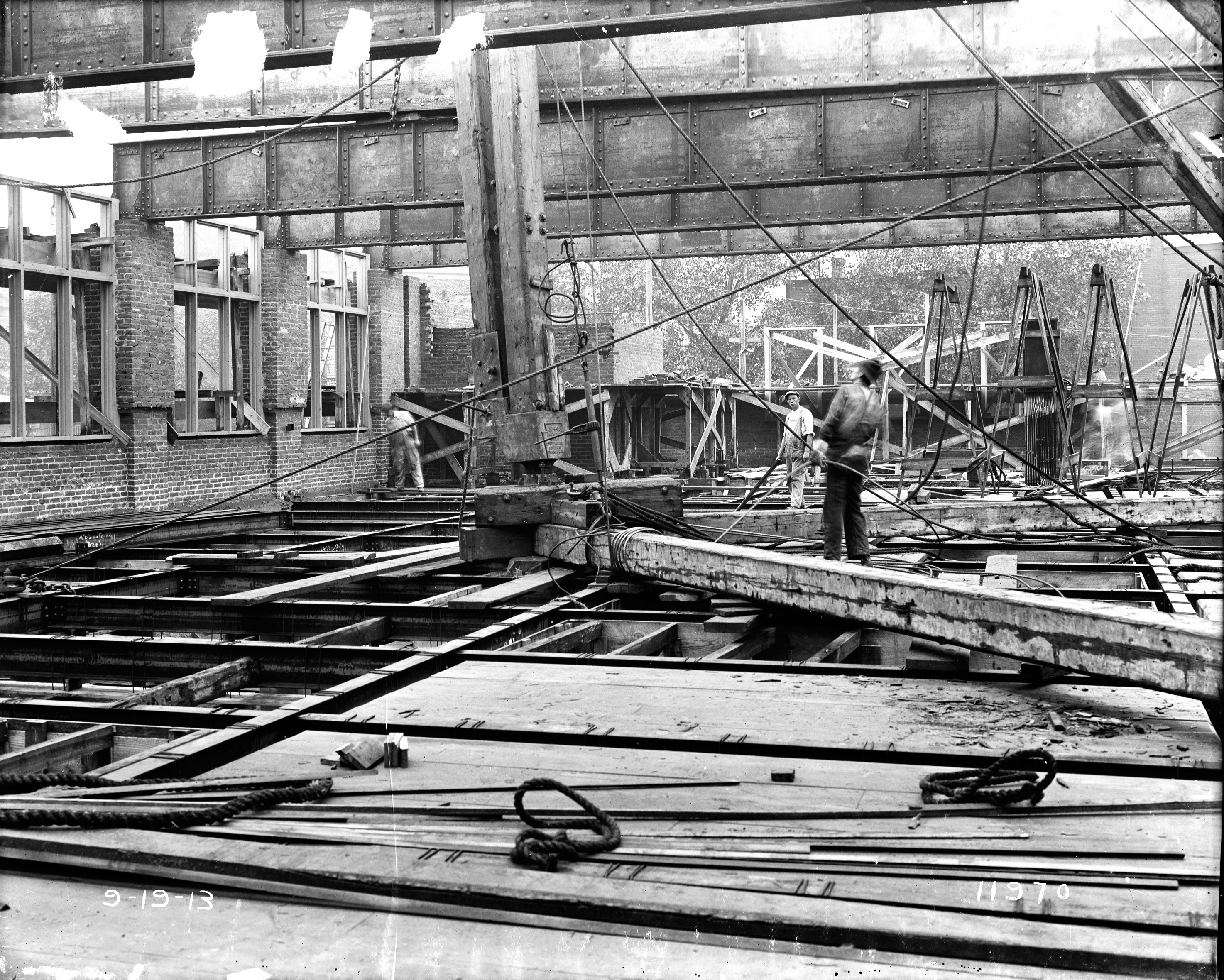
Construction of the Frankford Elevated

Construction on the Frankford Elevated section of what would become the L began in September 1915. Despite delays caused by World War I, the connection between the Frankford and Market Street lines was approved in 1919 and finalized in 1922. The Frankford Elevated was dedicated on November 4, 1922, and opened for service the following day. Trains from 69th Street alternated between the Frankford and Ferry Line terminals.

A north-south transit corridor was created with the opening of the Broad Street Line (now B) along Broad Street between City Hall and Olney Avenue on September 1, 1928. The line was expanded southward with service to Walnut—Locust in 1930 and Lombard—South in 1932. The Broad Street Line was extended to Snyder Avenue on September 18, 1938.

Following the opening of the Delaware River Bridge in 1926, traffic on the Delaware Ave branch declined sharply. Facing continued ridership losses after the opening of the Delaware River Bridge (now Benjamin Franklin Bridge), the Ferry Line ceased operations by May 6, 1939. Meanwhile, tunnel construction from 22nd Street to 46th Street along the Market Street Line, initiated in 1930 to replace the elevated structure east of 46th Street, had been delayed by funding shortages during the Great Depression.

Subway construction resumed in 1947, and the current configuration of the L opened on November 6, 1955, with the old elevated structure removed by June 20, 1956. Skip-stop operation was introduced on January 30, 1956, with designated "A" and "B" stops to improve service efficiency.

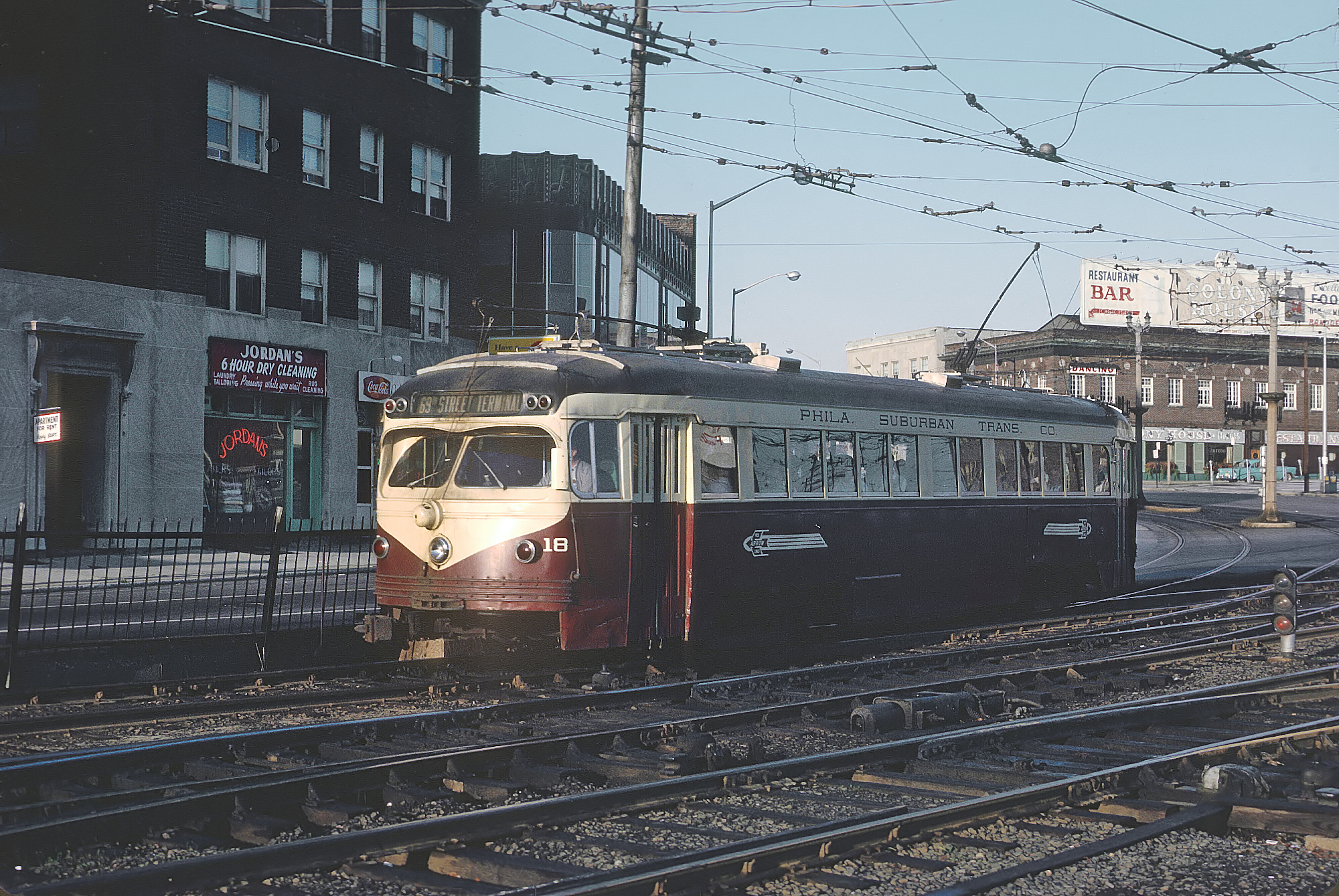
Philadelphia Suburban Transportation Company PCC streetcar approaching 69th Street Terminal on September 2, 1965.

The suburban transit system underwent significant changes during this period. The Philadelphia Suburban Transportation Company (more commonly known as the Red Arrow Lines) acquired both the Sharon Hill and Media lines in 1954. On June 24 of the same year, the West Chester Pike trolley line was replaced by buses, with rush-hour service to Westgate Hills continuing until 1958. The Philadelphia and Western Railroad was absorbed by the Philadelphia Suburban Transportation Company in 1953, and by 1956, the branch between Villanova and Strafford was abandoned, leaving only service between 69th Street and Norristown.

The express tracks on the Broad Street Line from Fern Rock to just south of Olney were completed in 1959. By the early 1960s, Philadelphia's transit landscape comprised numerous independent operators providing varied services. With profits falling, nearly bankrupt transit and rail companies were looking to exit the passenger business.

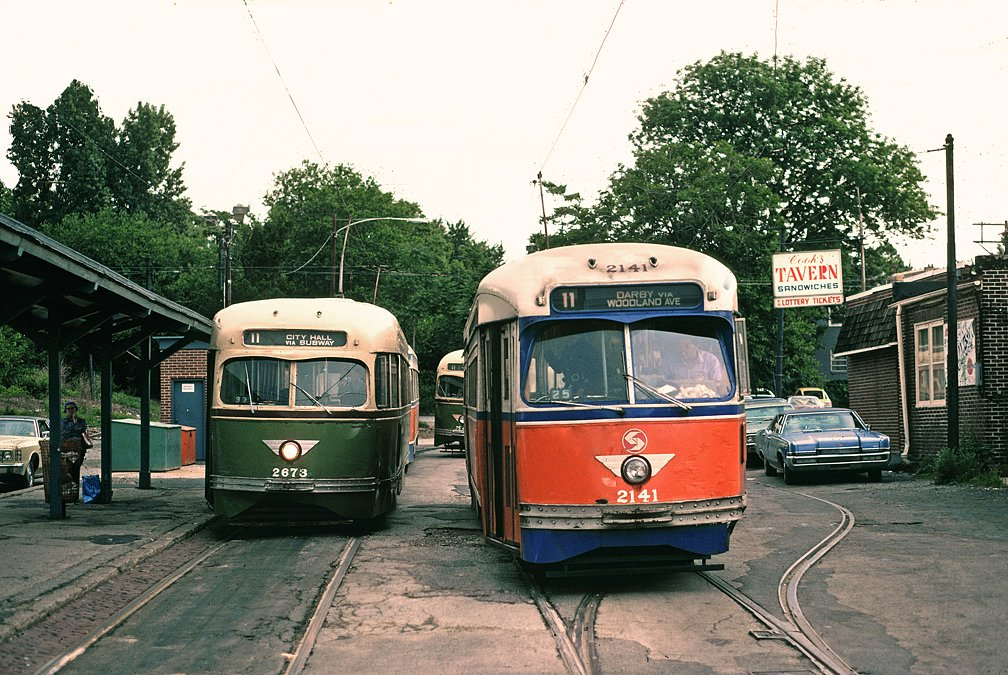
SEPTA 2141 and 2673 along T4 (then Route 11) at Darby

On August 17, 1963, the Pennsylvania General Assembly formally established the Southeastern Pennsylvania Transportation Authority (SEPTA) to plan, develop, coordinate, and consolidate public transportation services throughout Philadelphia, Bucks, Chester, Delaware, and Montgomery counties. The organization began operations on February 18, 1964. This began the systematic integration of the region's disparate transit networks.

The Ardmore trolley line, one of the suburban Red Arrow trolley routes, operated until December 1966, with its exclusive right-of-way later serving SEPTA Route 103. SEPTA absorbed the Red Arrow Lines in 1970.

The Broad Street Line expanded southward in 1973, extending to Pattison Avenue (now NRG Station) to serve the newly constructed sports complex. This extension completed the main structure of Philadelphia's north-south rapid transit corridor.

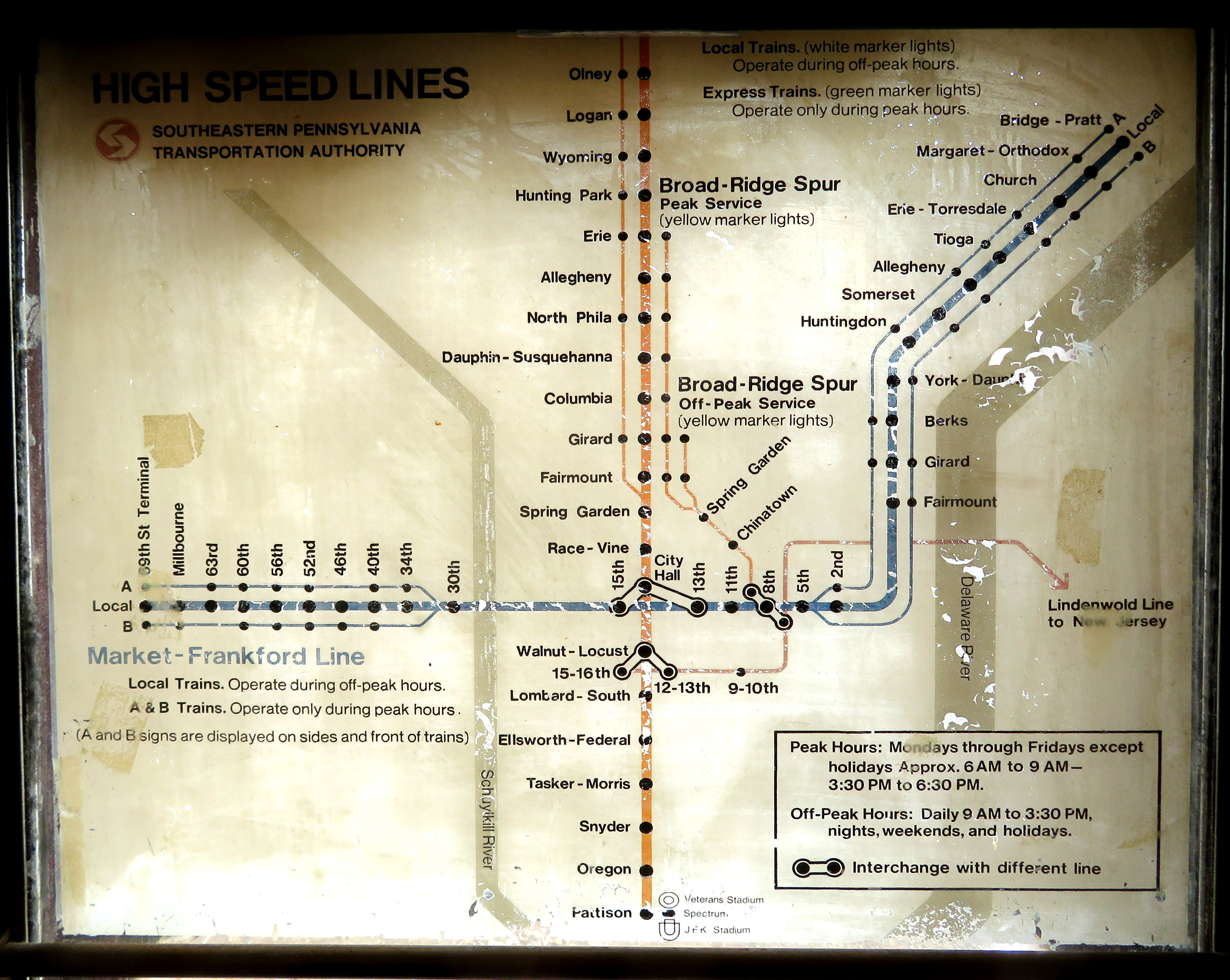
A 1970s SEPTA subway map in former B-1 car.

The Norristown High Speed Line (now the M) underwent significant modernization in the mid-1980s. Aging Brill "Bullet" cars, which had served for over 50 years, were replaced with former Chicago Transit Authority 6000 series cars between 1985 and 1986. By 1990, former Market-Frankford Line M-3 cars were introduced alongside the ex-CTA equipment.

Spring Garden station on the Ridge Avenue spur (now B3) closed in 1991. The express tracks on the Broad Street Line were extended from Olney to Erie in 1991.

A comprehensive modernization program for the Norristown High Speed Line in the late 1980s and early 1990s rebuilt or upgraded tracks, electrical substations, signaling systems, bridges, terminal buildings, and the maintenance depot. New ASEA N-5 rolling stock entered service beginning in 1993.

Trolley service on Route 15 (now the G) was replaced by buses in September 1992.

Between 1988 and 2003, SEPTA invested $493.3 million in a complete reconstruction of the Frankford Elevated between Bridge–Pratt terminal (now Frankford Transit Center) and the 2nd Street portal. This project included replacing ballasted trackage with a direct fixation system and upgrading all stations along the reconstructed section with higher boarding platforms and elevators for improved accessibility and compliance with the Americans with Disabilities Act.

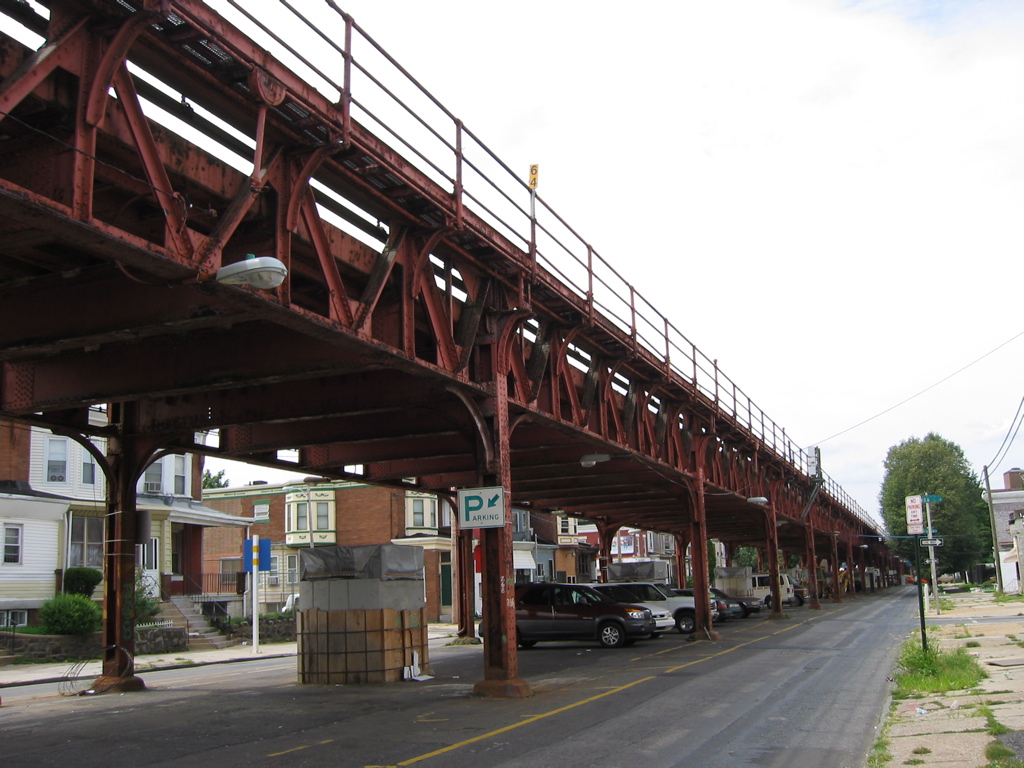
Former Market Street Elevated structure

A parallel reconstruction initiative, costing $567 million and executed between 1999 and 2009, replaced the Market Street Elevated between 69th Street Transportation Center and the 44th Street portal. The new structure featured single-pillar supports to accommodate roadway widening on Market Street, with the final station on this project—63rd Street—reopening on May 4, 2009.

=== 21st century ===
The Bridge–Pratt terminal closed in 2003, replaced by a new $160 million Frankford Transportation Center. Route 15 trolley service returned on September 4, 2005, following a $100 million investment in track rehabilitation and overhead wire repairs. This revival featured rebuilt 1947 St. Louis Car-built PCC II vehicles, modernized by the Brookville Equipment Corporation at a cost of $1.3 million per car.

The traditional skip-stop service on the Market–Frankford Line, which had operated during weekday rush hours since January 30, 1956, was discontinued on February 21, 2020. That same year, reconstruction related to Interstate 95 necessitated the temporary replacement of streetcar service along Route 15 with buses for at least 18 months. The COVID-19 pandemic brought major challenges in early 2020, with the network operating "Lifeline Service" that bypassed several stations. Full service was restored by July 2020 as the region adapted to changing public health conditions.

=== Unification and reorganization ===
In September 2021, SEPTA officials proposed to rebrand its rail transit services to make the system easier to navigate. The lines included the Market–Frankford Line, Broad Street Line, subway–surface trolley lines, Norristown High Speed Line, Route 15 trolley, and Media–Sharon Hill Line.

Under the initial proposal, new maps, station signage, and line designations would be created. Trunk lines would receive a letter and a color, with services having a numeric suffix and service name, to make wayfinding easier. Services on the current Market–Frankford Line, for instance, would be called the "L Lines" and colored blue, with local service becoming the "L1 Market–Frankford Local".

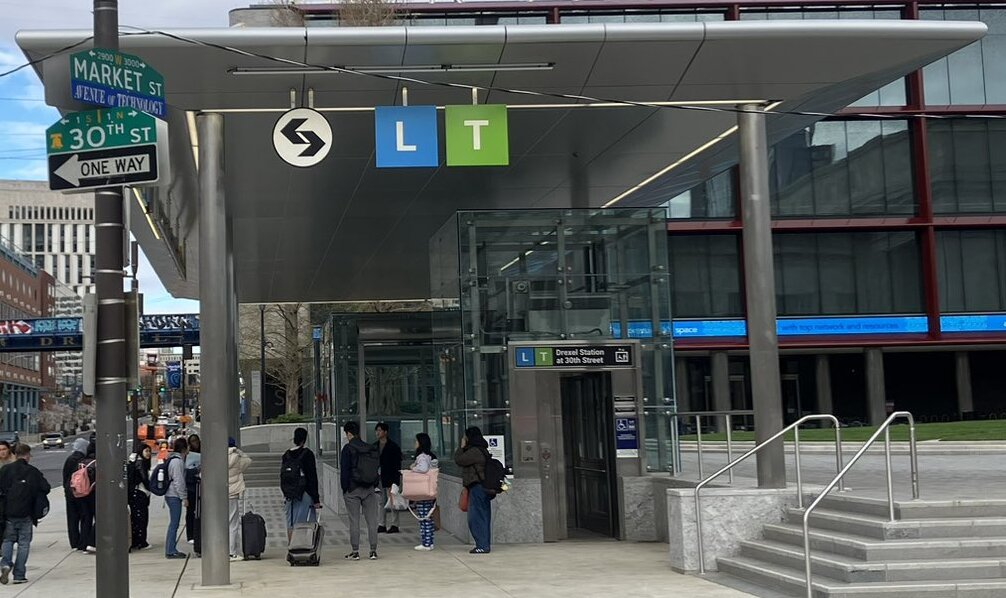
SEPTA Metro signage installed at Drexel Station at 30th Street in February, 2024.

SEPTA budgeted $40 million to June 2023 for the rebranding. In March 2022, SEPTA revised the SEPTA Metro proposal based on community feedback collected during September and October 2021. Under the amended proposal, each lettered service will be known as "Line" rather than "Lines". Real-time information will be presented at stations on screens. Stations with shared names would be renamed to avoid confusion. SEPTA upgraded its website in late 2023, before the planned rollout of SEPTA Metro in 2024. SEPTA also upgraded their app to reflect the changes in late 2024. The final conventions for line names state they are to be referred to by letter only (i.e. "the L", not "the L line")

The first station to get new signs was Drexel Station at 30th Street in February 2024, followed by Wyoming station on the B1 on January 4, 2025. New station and line names took effect systemwide on February 23–24, 2025. The former station and line names will be used along with the new names for several months.

== Lines ==
Since February 24, 2025, lines on the SEPTA Metro have been referred to by their letter. Despite this change, the former names are still commonly used. SEPTA services are structured within a naming hierarchy, with SEPTA Metro being one of the three primary systems, alongside Bus and Regional Rail. Below the system level, there are the lines, which are identified by a single letter, such as "the B," without the need to include the word "Line." Further down, service patterns are designated by the line letter followed by a number.

Line	Type	Service	Termini	
Line	Type	Service	South/West	North/East
L (SEPTA)	Rapid transit	All Stops	69th Street T.C.	Frankford T.C.
B (SEPTA)	Rapid transit	Local	NRG Station	Fern Rock T.C.
B (SEPTA)	Rapid transit	Express	Walnut–Locust; NRG Station (Sports Express)	Fern Rock T.C.
B (SEPTA)	Rapid transit	Spur	8th–Market	Olney Transit Center (Weekday); Fern Rock T.C. (Saturday)
T (SEPTA)	Light rail	Lancaster Avenue	63rd–Malvern/Overbrook	13th Street
T (SEPTA)	Light rail	Baltimore Avenue	61st–Baltimore/Angora	13th Street
T (SEPTA)	Light rail	Chester Avenue	Yeadon; Darby Transit Center (Limited)	13th Street
T (SEPTA)	Light rail	Woodland Avenue	Darby Transit Center	13th Street
T (SEPTA)	Light rail	Elmwood Avenue	80th Street/Eastwick	13th Street
G (SEPTA)	Streetcar	All Stops	63rd–Girard	Richmond–Westmoreland or Frankford–Delaware
D (SEPTA)	Light rail	Media	Orange Street/Media	69th Street T.C.
D (SEPTA)	Light rail	Sharon Hill	Chester Pike/Sharon Hill	69th Street T.C.
M (SEPTA)	Light metro	Local	69th Street T.C.	Norristown T.C.

== Ridership ==
Ridership from 1996 to 2025
Year	Ridership	%±
1996	110,260,000	—
1997	111,755,900	+1.4%
1998	94,593,700	−15.4%
1999	104,020,100	+10.0%
2000	110,892,900	+6.6%
2001	105,951,500	−4.5%
2002	103,348,900	−2.5%
2003	104,935,600	+1.5%
2004	105,140,300	+0.2%
2005	106,306,500	+1.1%
2006	109,400,500	+2.9%
2007	115,736,300	+5.8%
2008	117,378,900	+1.4%
2009	121,126,600	+3.2%
2010	125,385,400	+3.5%
2011	132,704,700	+5.8%
2012	129,859,500	−2.1%
2013	131,232,900	+1.1%
2014	125,164,100	−4.6%
2015	126,836,300	+1.3%
2016	119,336,700	−5.9%
2017	116,015,200	−2.8%
2018	118,414,600	+2.1%
2019	114,562,000	−3.3%
2020	37,679,600	−67.1%
2021	44,646,400	+18.5%
2022	52,746,600	+18.1%
2023	58,808,300	+11.5%
2024	74,291,700	+26.3%
2025	90,242,900	+21.5%
Source: APTA

Between 1996 and 2019, annual ridership on the SEPTA Metro network ranged from 110.3 to 132.7 million trips, peaking in the early 2010s before entering a gradual decline in the latter half of the decade. Ridership fell sharply during the COVID-19 pandemic, dropping to 37.7 million trips in 2020, and subsequently recovered to 90.2 million trips by 2025, remaining below pre-pandemic levels.

View source data.

== Rolling stock ==
=== Rapid transit ===
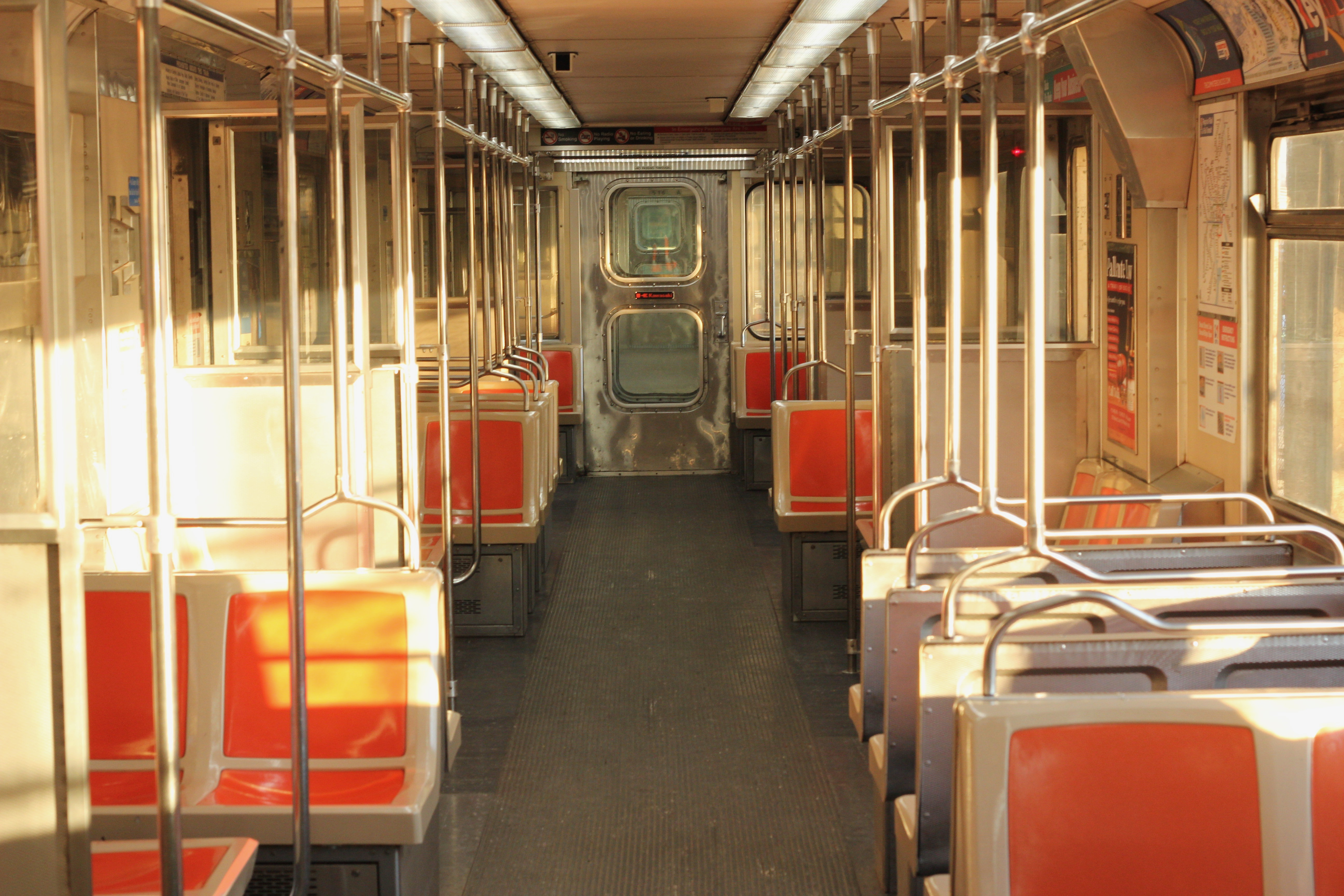
The interior of a Broad Street Line train

The L uses a class of cars known as M-4, as they, like the Broad Street B-IVs, represent the line's fourth generation of cars. They were built from 1996 to 1999 by Adtranz. These cars use a broad gauge of 5 ft 2 1/2 in (1,588 mm), known as "Pennsylvania trolley gauge". In 2017, 90 cars had emergency welding work performed to fix cracking steel beams. Then in 2020 all the cars, including the ones temporarily repaired in 2017, had to have more permanent welding work done to fix cracking steel beams. On July 4, 2022, SEPTA began the process to obtain a new M-5 fleet to replace the M-4 cars. As per the SEPTA Board Meeting documents for July 25, 2024, SEPTA will order 200 M-5 cars from Hitachi Rail STS, with two option orders of 20 cars each. The pilot cars are expected to arrive in fall 2028, with the first production cars arriving spring 2029 and the final production cars arriving by spring 2031.

The B uses cars built by Kawasaki between 1982 and 1984. These cars, known as B-IV as they are the fourth generation used on the line, are stainless steel and include some cars with operating cabs at both ends, as well as some with only a single cab. These cars use the standard gauge of 4 ft 8 1/2 in (1,435 mm).

=== Trolley ===
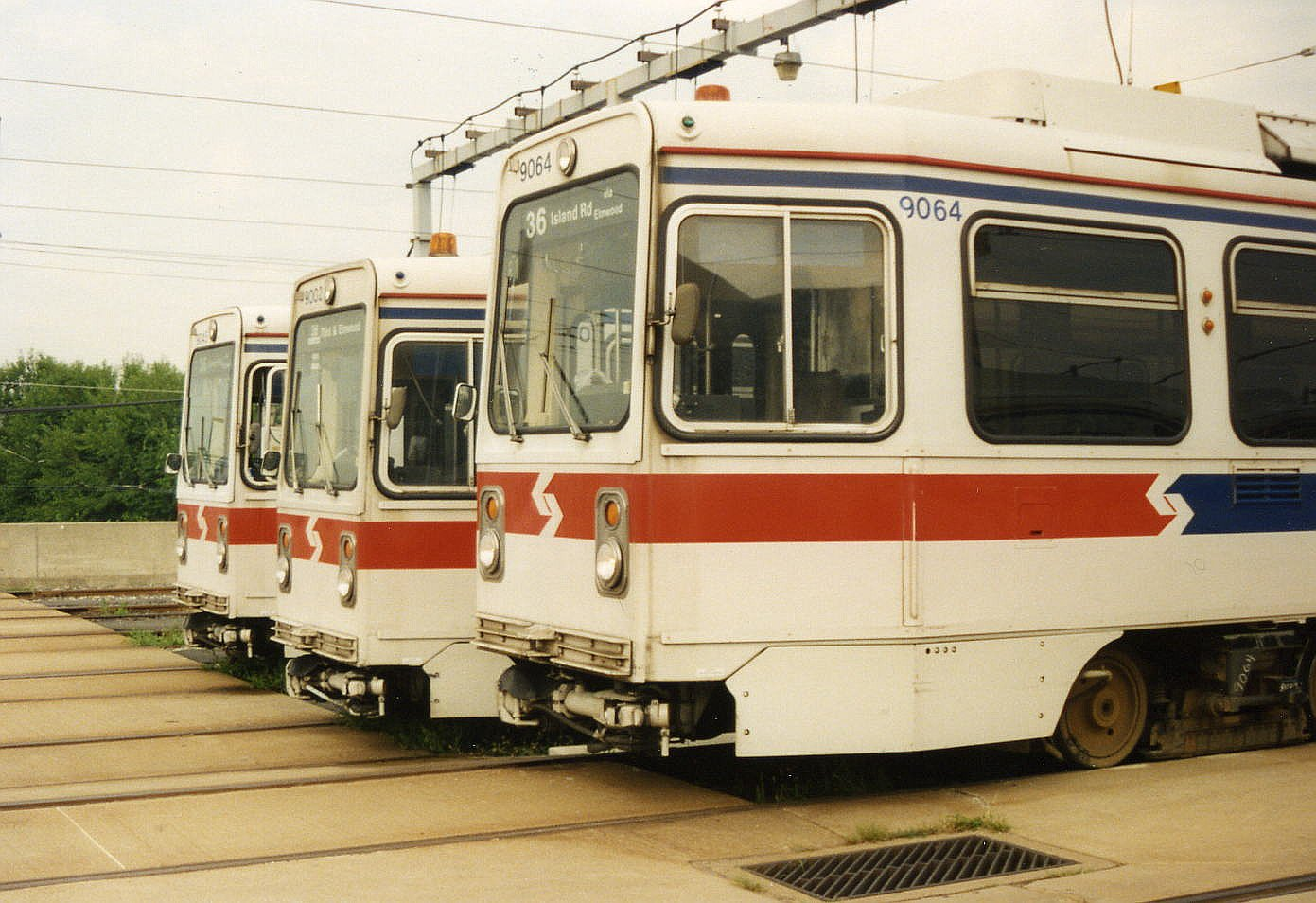
A SEPTA single-end Kawasaki trolley in the maintenance yard in 1993

The SEPTA trolley fleet has three different types of cars.

The 112 vehicles used on the T were built by Kawasaki beginning in 1981 after a 1980 prototype was delivered and tested. Known as "K-cars", they use the 5 ft 2 1/2 in (1,588 mm) Pennsylvania trolley gauge. Larger than the PCC cars they replaced, they are 50 feet long and capable of reaching a top speed of 45 miles per hour (72 km/h). They also were the first in North America to have unitized roof-mounted air conditioners and to have electronic control of switches at junctions. The city cars operate out of two depots, Elmwood and Callowhill.

The G uses PCC cars. These cars were originally built in 1947–1948 by the St. Louis Car Company and were rebuilt by Brookville (and renamed PCC II) for the line's reopening in 2005 to include air conditioning and a wheelchair lift. The Girard line has the same 5 ft 2 1/2 in (1,588 mm) Pennsylvania trolley gauge as the T and operates out of Callowhill depot. Between 2020 and 2025, the cars were rebuilt by SEPTA and upgraded to include plastic seating.

The D use 29 Kawasaki-built vehicles similar to, but slightly longer and wider than, the cars used on the T. They use a slightly wider wheel profile than the city lines, but the same 5 ft 2 1/2 in (1,588 mm) wheel gauge. Different wheel profiles and gear ratios provide higher speeds. Notably, they are double-ended, unlike the T, as these lines lack any loops to turn the vehicles at their suburban terminals. Unlike the T and G cars, which use traditional trolley pole power collectors, the D cars use pantographs and are capable of a top speed of 50 miles per hour (80 km/h).

Currently, SEPTA is ordering new 130 low floor streetcars that will be built and delivered by Alstom. These trolley cars are scheduled to enter service between 2027-2030. These cars will operate on the T, G, and D.

=== Light metro ===
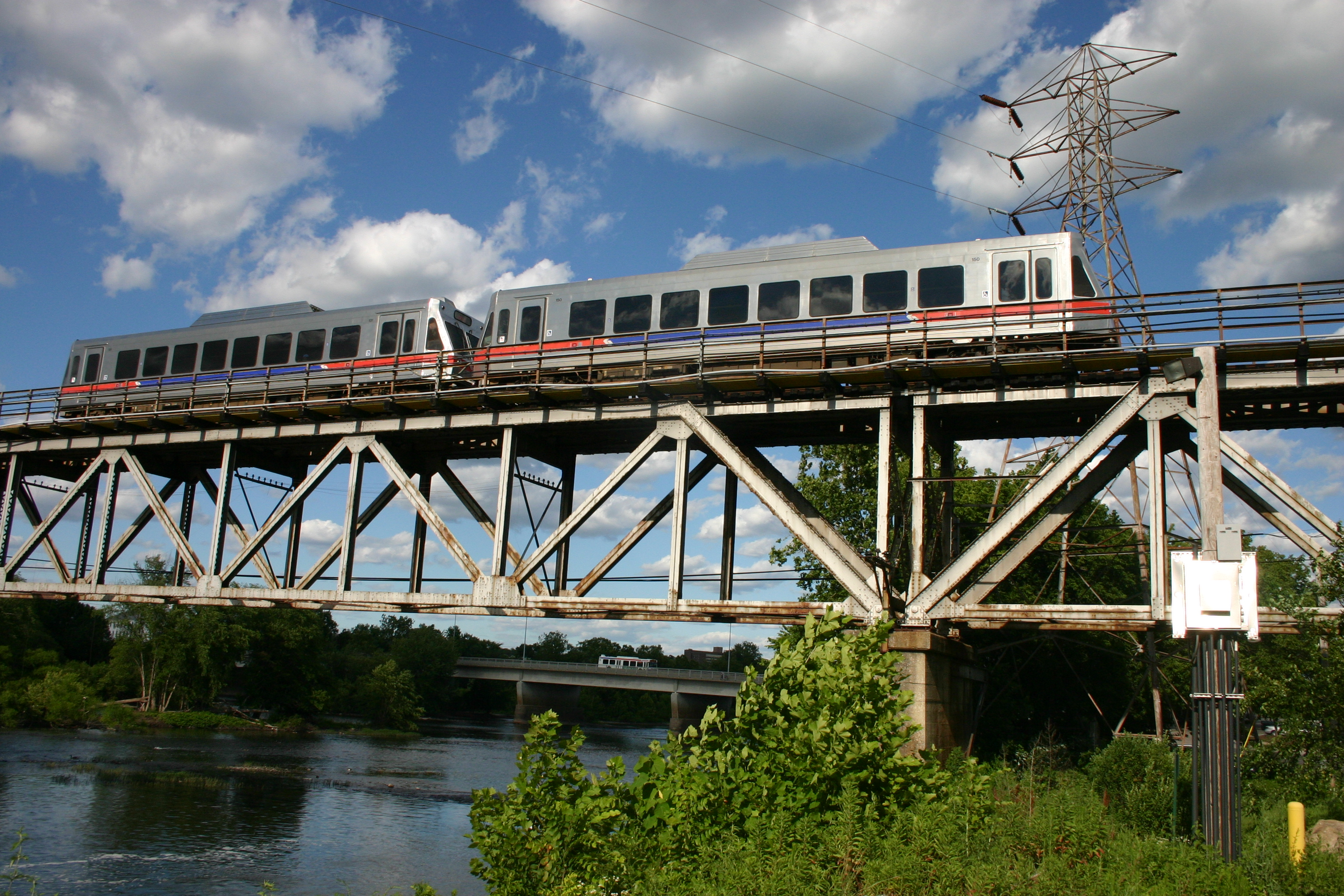
N-5 cars crossing the Bridgeport–Norristown Viaduct.

The M uses a unique class of 26 cars known as N-5s. They were delivered in 1993 by ABB after significant production difficulties and a change of assembly locations. These cars are powered by a nominally 700 volt top-contact third rail. They run on a standard gauge track. They are the first fleet of cars in North America to have Alternating Current (AC) traction motors.

They have running gear (trucks) incorporating design elements used on the Swedish High-Speed trains. Axle suspensions provide flexibility that allows axles to steer themselves around curves as small as 5 degrees. While the vehicles were designed for a top speed of 80 miles per hour (130 km/h), the signal system allows operations at up to 55 miles per hour (89 km/h).

== Sources ==
- Cox, Harold E. (1967). May, Jack (ed.). The Road from Upper Darby. The Story of the Market Street Subway-Elevated. New York, NY: Electric Railroaders' Association. OCLC 54770701.
- Cudahy, Brian J. (2003). A Century of Subways: Celebrating 100 Years of New York's Underground Railways. New York: Fordham University Press. ISBN 9780823222957.
