= Fashion District Philadelphia =

Shopping mall in Center City, Pennsylvania, U.S.

Coordinates: 39.952076°N 75.156612°W

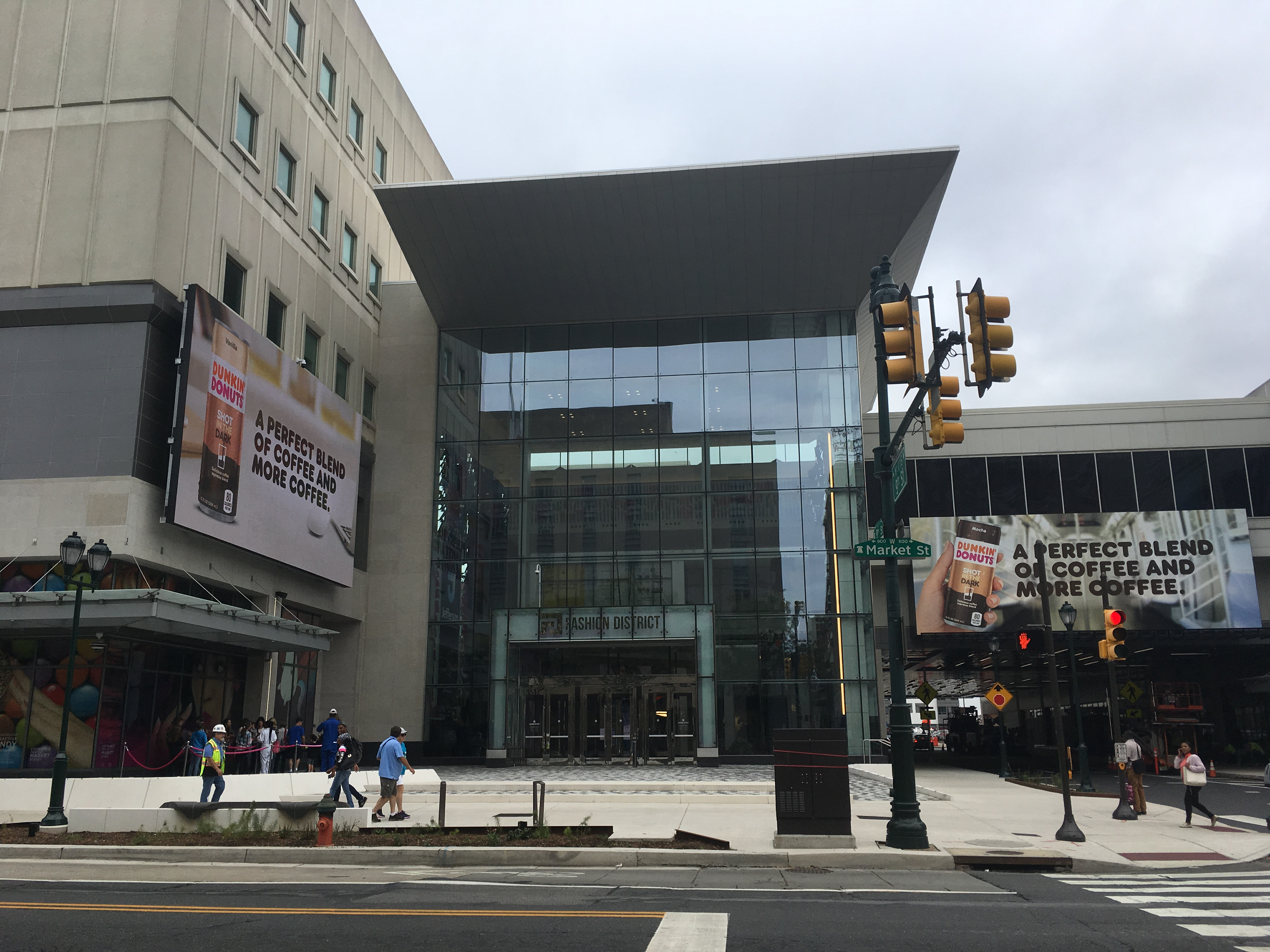
- Exterior view of The Cube main entrance at 9th and Market streets (September 2019)
- Location: Philadelphia, Pennsylvania, U.S.
- Address: 9th & Market streets
- Opened: August 11, 1977; 49 years ago (as The Gallery, expanded October 12, 1983); September 19, 2019; 7 years ago (as Fashion District)
- Renovated: 2015–2019
- Closed: August 2015; 11 years ago (original Gallery mall)
- Demolished: August 2015–June 2017 (original Gallery mall, partial)
- Previous names: The Gallery at Market East (1977–2015); Fashion Outlets of Philadelphia (planning, 2015–2017)
- Developer: The Rouse Company; JCP Realty, Inc.
- Manager: CBRE Group
- Owner: Macerich
- Architect: Bower & Fradley Architects and Cope Linder & Associates (Gallery I); Nelson Architecture & Interiors (Gallery II)
- Num. of stores: 55 (230+ at peak)
- Num. of anchor tenants: 4
- Floor area: 1,080,002 square feet (100,000 m^{2})
- Floors: 4 (including one basement level) (Note: First floor is underground.)
- Parking: 2 parking garages
- Public transit: 8th Street: B3 PATCO Speedline L 11th Street: L Jefferson Station: SEPTA Regional Rail; Philadelphia PPA Bus Terminal; SEPTA bus: 17, 23, 33, 38, 44, 45, 47, 48, 61; NJ Transit bus: 313, 315, 316, 317, 400, 401, 402, 404, 406, 408, 409, 410, 412, 414, 417, 551, 555
- Building details
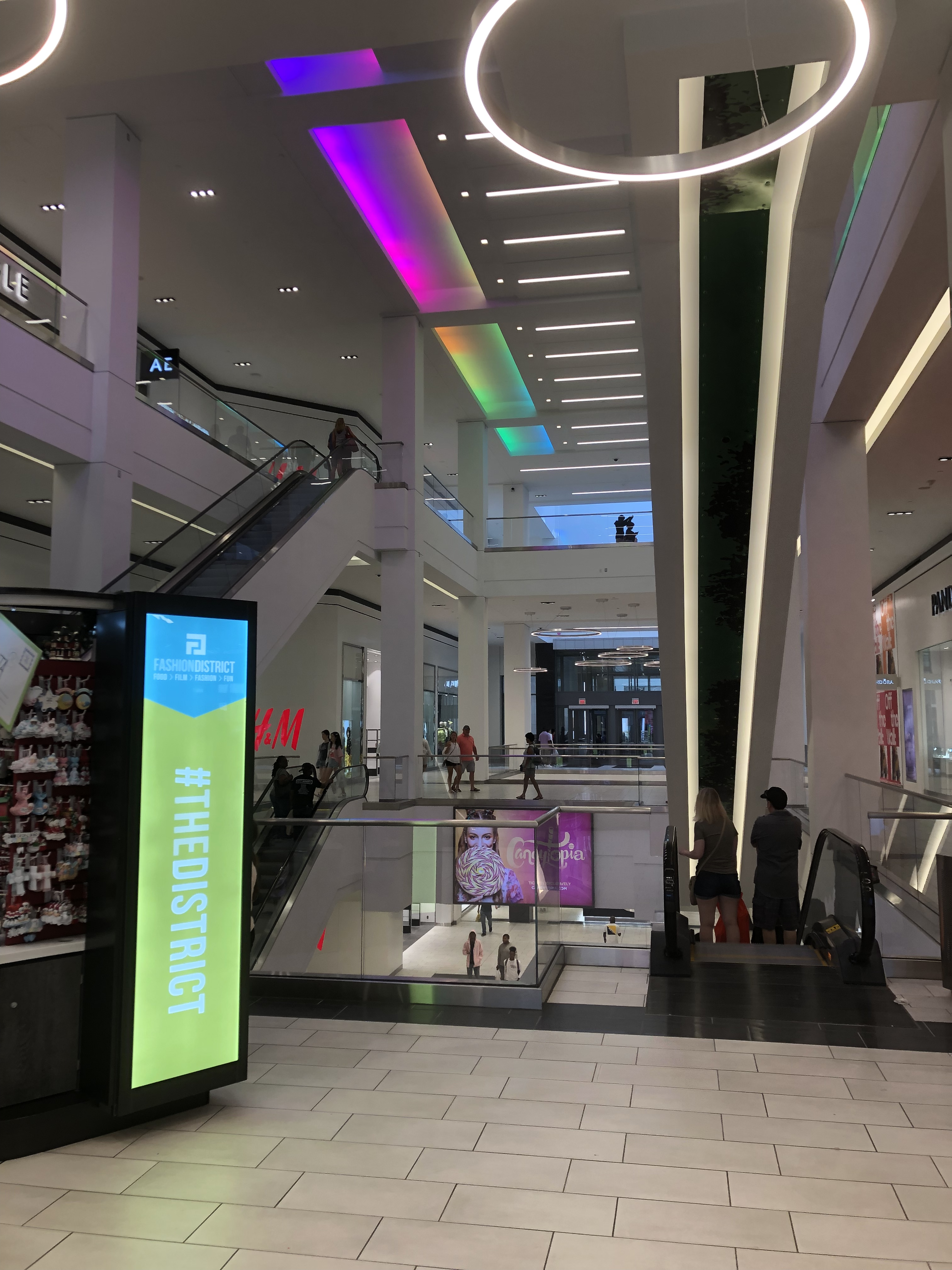
- Interior view near 10th Street entrance

General information
- Status: Operational
- Construction started: 1974 (The Gallery); 2015 (Fashion District)
- Completed: 1977 (The Gallery); 2019 (Fashion District)

Renovating team
- Architect: JPRA Architects
- Renovating firm: PREIT Realty and Macerich Co.

Website
- fashiondistrictphiladelphia.com; galleryatmarketeast.com at the Wayback Machine (May 2014 archive)

Fashion District Philadelphia, referred to by some locals simply as Fashion District, is a downtown regional mall in Philadelphia, Pennsylvania, United States, located in Center City along Market Street. It opened in September 2019 on the site of a previous mall known as The Gallery at Market East. It was also formerly known as Fashion Outlets of Philadelphia during planning.

Initially developed as a joint venture between the Rouse Company, JCP Realty, Inc. (the real estate subsidiary of JCPenney), Philadelphia Redevelopment Authority (PRA), and the Philadelphia Industrial Development Corporation (PIDC) and had its grand opening celebration on August 11, 1977, the mall was financially successful enough that the mall was later expanded to include The Gallery II, which opened on October 12, 1983.

The mall, however, has declined and later became outdated by the early 2010s. Department stores, such as Kmart, frequently came and left, and in August 2015, The Gallery officially closed its doors to undergo a major transformation by Macerich and PREIT into Fashion District Philadelphia, which opened to the public on September 19, 2019. However, the current mall is also struggling, and as of August 2025, it had a 50% vacancy rate.

Fashion District Philadelphia is part of the Market East shopping complex, and as of September 2021 its anchors include Burlington, Primark, AMC Theatres (operating as AMC DINE-IN Fashion District 8), and Round1 Bowling & Arcade.

== History ==
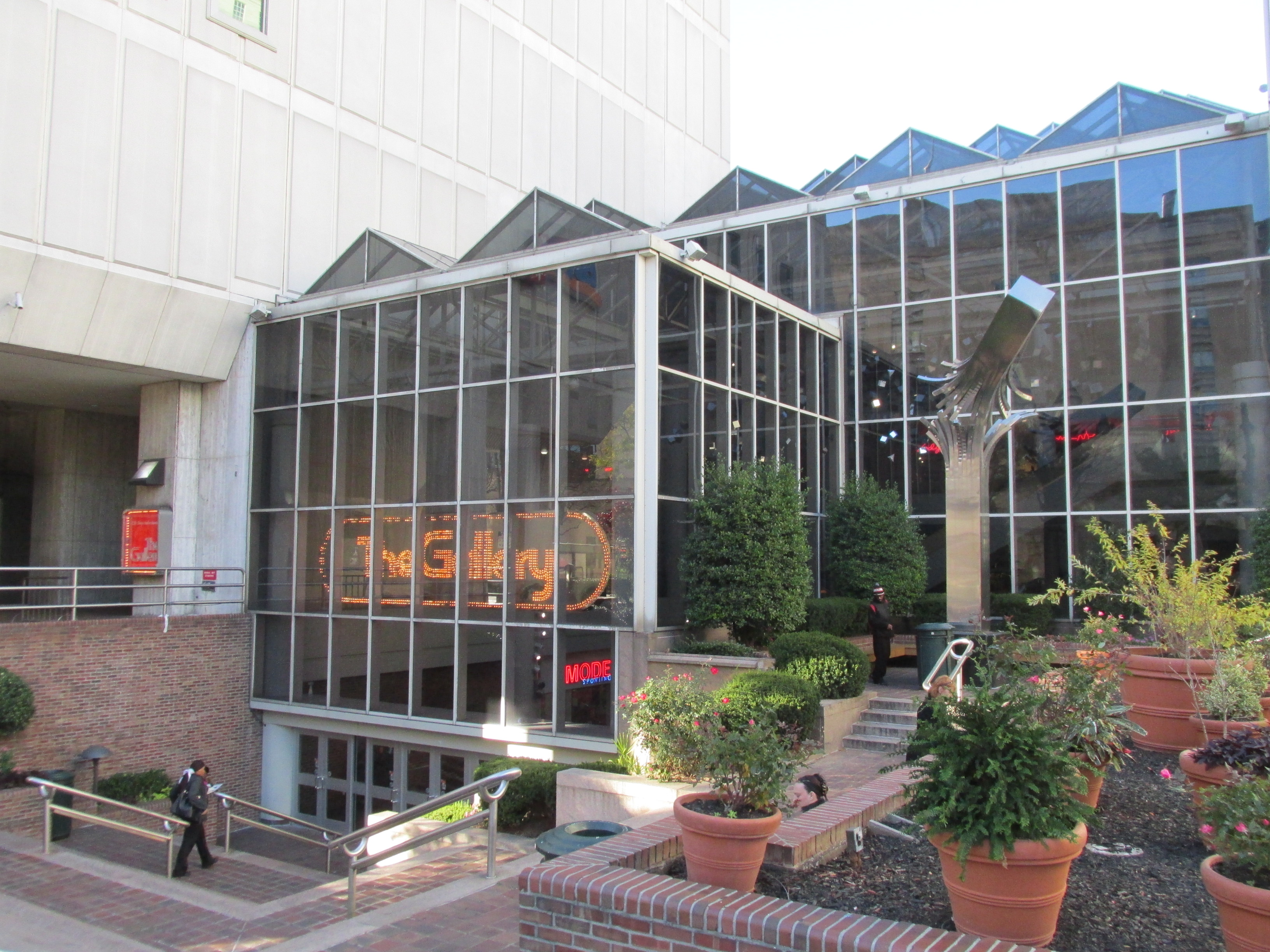
The Gallery at Market East's main entrance in November 2013

Prior to the Fashion District Philadelphia redevelopment, the mall originally opened in 1977 as The Gallery, which was jointly developed by The Rouse Company, the Philadelphia Redevelopment Authority and the Philadelphia Industrial Development Corporation. The Gallery II was also developed by these three firms, alongside JCPenney (through JCP Realty, Inc.).

=== 1946–1977: Planning, construction and opening ===
In the mid-20th century, Market Street was home to the "Big Six" department stores: Strawbridge & Clothier (now Macy's nationally), John Wanamaker, Gimbel Brothers, Lit Brothers, N. Snellenburg & Co., and Frank & Seder. These stores were central for Philadelphia's urban life and drew shoppers from across the region.

Urban renewal in Philadelphia began in 1946, with the formation of the Philadelphia Redevelopment Authority (PRA). In 1947, The Better Philadelphia Exhibition showcases grand redevelopment plans by Edmund Bacon, building public support. In 1948, the Greater Philadelphia Movement (GPM) is formed, uniting business leaders to support renewal. The first urban renewal sites are certified. In 1949, the Federal Housing Act provides crucial funding for slum clearance, boosting local efforts. The era of major federal funding and large-scale projects begin in the 1950s, with initial actions targeting areas like East Poplar and West Philadelphia (University City), for clearing "blighted" areas for new development, including university expansion.

In the 1960s and early '70s, the post-World War II migration, along with the rise of suburban shopping malls, drew shoppers away from downtown Philadelphia as new malls opened in Pennsylvania and nearby New Jersey, such as Exton Square Mall, King of Prussia Mall, Plymouth Meeting Mall, and Cherry Hill Mall which is 15–20 minutes away from downtown Philadelphia.

As a result, urban planner Edmund Bacon proposed a massive redevelopment to bring the "suburban mall experience" into the heart of the city. Unlike Bacon's open-air shopping centers, he wanted this mall to be enclosed for a climate-controlled, suburban mall experience. The Philadelphia Redevelopment Authority and the Philadelphia Industrial Development Corporation (PIDC) partnered to develop this mall. The Gallery was approved in 1964, and a commitment was to develop an underground mall specifically on the north side of Market Street.

The Rouse Company of Columbia, Maryland, led by James W. Rouse, who also developed Pennsylvania's Exton Square Mall and Plymouth Meeting Mall, entered in a joint venture with the PRA and PIDC, and was officially selected as the developer for the project, founding 39 subsidiaries (TRC Gallery at Market East 1-39, LLC) and Gimbels signed a deal to have its new flagship store in The Gallery. Rouse hired local architectural firms Bower & Fradley Architects (now Bower Lewis Thrower Architects/BLT Architects) and Cope Linder & Associates. Construction began in 1974.

The Gallery had its grand opening on August 11, 1977, which involved a ribbon-cutting ceremony. Upon opening, the mall included the Market Fair food court with 22 stalls, and was in the basement level under Gimbels. It also included 40-foot-tall trees, and direct underground connections to SEPTA regional rail and subway lines.

=== 1980–2003: Expansion and sale ===
The Gallery was so successful that the city approved an expansion of the mall. The Rouse Co. expanded the mall in the 1980s in partnership with JCP Realty, Inc., the development arm of JCPenney, with the construction of a second phase called Gallery II, which opened on October 12, 1983. As part of the expansion, the basement concourse was extended to additional blocks, and the food court was moved down to the end under Gallery II, which was directly connected to the 11th Street SEPTA station. The Phase I building was dubbed The Gallery I after the expansion. Gallery II was anchored by a three-story JCPenney department store.

Gimbels closed its Gallery location on August 18, 1986, due to liquidation. The chain itself became defunct one year later, and it was once the largest department store in the world. It was replaced by Stern's, but that also closed in 1990. Stern's was later replaced by Clover in 1995, but the chain liquidated one year later. It was finally replaced by Kmart in 1997.

JCPenney closed its Gallery store in January 2001 due to profitability problems. It was replaced by Burlington Coat Factory. PREIT acquired The Gallery in April 2003 from the Rouse Company and Gallery II in the third fiscal quarter of 2004 from the state's Public School Employees' Retirement System. The total complex measures approximately 1,100,000 square feet (100,000 m^{2}) of retail space, and at its peak, had over 230 stores.

=== 2008–2015: Decline and closure ===
The number of businesses operating in the mall had changed from over 230 to over 130. In September 2008, the developers of Foxwoods Casino Philadelphia changed their proposed casino location to The Gallery at Market East after receiving opposition from residents near the original proposed site in South Philadelphia. The new proposal was endorsed by both Mayor Michael Nutter and Governor Ed Rendell. The original proposal for the Foxwoods Casino at The Gallery at Market East was for a 3,000-slot-machine casino on two floors that were occupied by Burlington, which would have necessitated moving the store. However, on February 26, 2009, it was announced that the developers had instead decided to locate their new casino on three floors of the former Strawbridge's building.

In January 2014, it was announced that Kmart would be closing its Gallery store in late April. At the time, it was announced that there were plans to turn the former Kmart space into multiple street-facing stores centered on an atrium, and to redevelop the mostly vacant top level of the mall in other ways. In April 2014, Century 21 Clothing announced that it would open an anchor store at the mall, which has since closed.

=== 2014–2019: Redevelopment as Fashion District Philadelphia ===
In July 2014, Macerich acquired a 50% stake in The Gallery at Market East, and invested $106.8 million to redevelop the mall as part of a joint venture partnership with PREIT. When the developers were planning redevelopment, they once considered demolishing the entire mall. As of June 19, 2015, the $325 million remodeling of The Gallery had been officially approved by the city council, and the legislation had been approved by Philadelphia Mayor Michael Nutter.

The Gallery officially closed its doors in August 2015 and began a structural gutting of the interior and partial exterior demolition. Particularly, the mall's main entrance was razed because it had stairs that would descend shoppers below ground level before entering the mall, creating a "sunken" effect. Construction was expected to last for two years, and a grand opening sometime in 2017. The Burlington and Century 21 anchor stores would remain open during reconstruction.

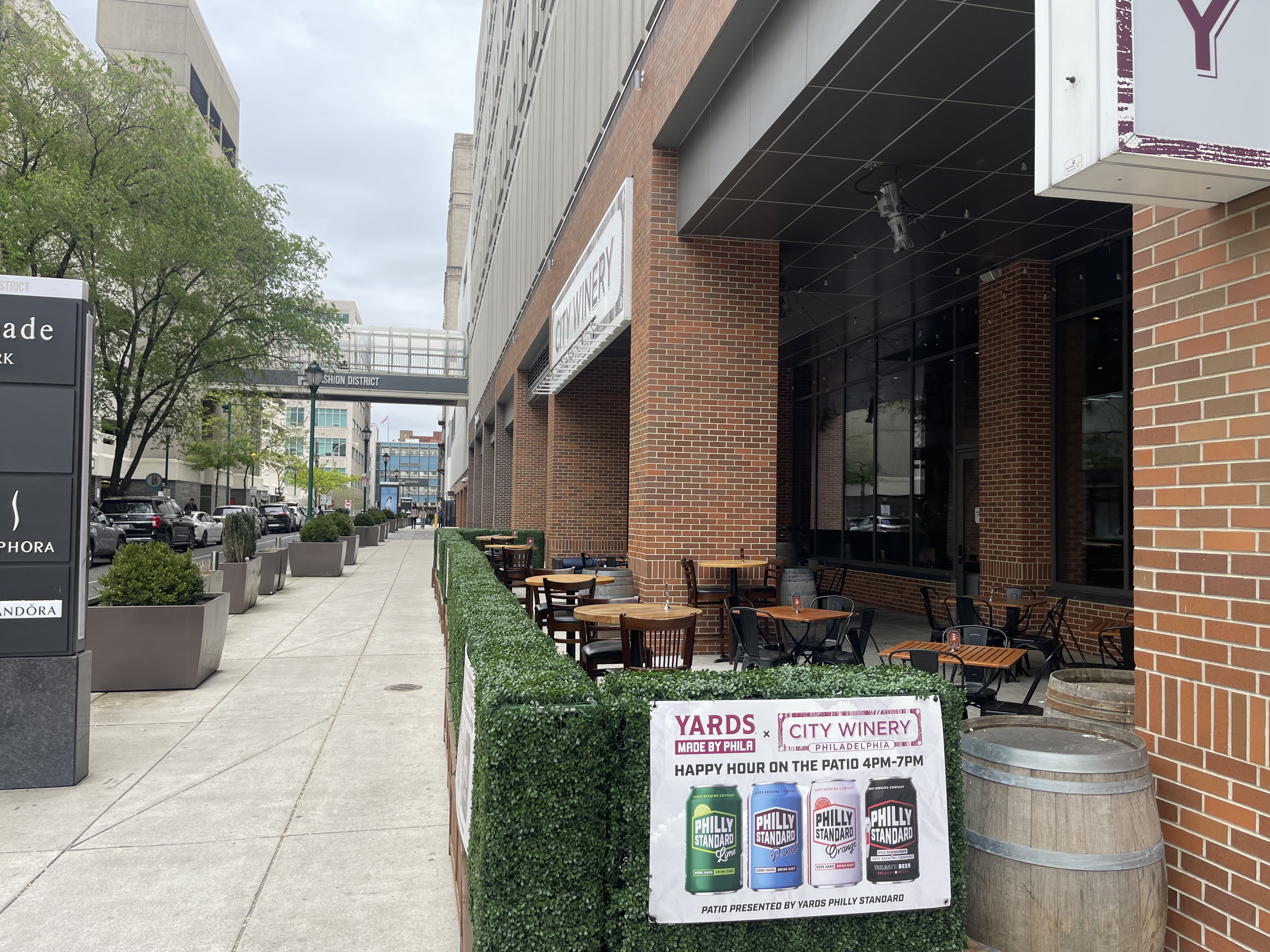
Fashion District Philadelphia bridge over Filbert Street. Mall is directly to the right.

In August 2017, the developers announced that the outlets plan had been abandoned and the mall would instead feature a mix of retail, entertainment, and dining venues, much like a traditional mall. The mall would effectively be renamed Fashion District Philadelphia, and was initially slated to reopen in the spring of 2018. However, the decision to relocate Burlington and add an AMC Theatres multiplex, branded AMC DINE-IN Fashion District 8, on the third floor of the former JCPenney/previous Burlington space, led PREIT to delay opening most of the revamped complex until 2019. The grand opening for Fashion District Philadelphia took place on September 19, 2019, with a ribbon-cutting ceremony held.

Fashion District Philadelphia's new main entrance is known as The Cube, a four-story glass atrium structure with a street-level entrance connected to the mall's second floor.

=== 2019–present: Second decline ===
The AMC DINE-IN Fashion District 8 multiplex opened on November 4, 2019. The opening of this movie theater marked the first time since 2002 that Center City Philadelphia had a multi-screen movie theater; Philadelphia had previously been the only major city in the United States without a multi-screen movie theater in the downtown area. On December 21, 2019, Round1 Bowling & Arcade had its grand opening on the third floor of Fashion District Philadelphia.

In October 2019, it was announced that Primark would open a 34,200 sq ft (3,180 m^{2}) store on the first and second floors of the former JCPenney/previous Burlington space at Fashion District Philadelphia at the corner of 11th and Market streets. The store opened on September 16, 2021. Century 21 announced in September 2020 that they would close all of their stores—including Fashion District—as a result of the chain filing for Chapter 11 bankruptcy.

Reopening the mall in September 2019 was seen as unfortunate timing, as the COVID-19 pandemic in 2020 caused the mall to shut down temporarily after just a few months of operation as Fashion District. After PREIT filed for bankruptcy in 2020, PREIT relinquished its primary control of Fashion District Philadelphia on January 1, 2021, with Macerich taking over management of the mall. Macerich made a $100 million payment on a $301 million loan backed by Fashion District Philadelphia.

On June 22, 2021, Shoppers World opened, replacing the defunct Century 21. On December 16, 2021, a Giant Heirloom Market grocery store opened in the ground level of the former Strawbridge's department store at 8th Street. The store later closed on December 28, 2024, citing poor performance and other problems at the location.

On July 21, 2022, the Philadelphia 76ers, the city's NBA franchise, announced its plans to build a new arena, 76 Place at Market East, on part of the site, costing at least $1.3 billion. The plans later fell through due to opposition and the 76ers agreeing to a deal with Comcast Spectator to instead seek to build a new arena in South Philadelphia Sports Complex.

On April 17, 2023, Fashion District Philadelphia implemented a curfew for people under the age of 18 after 2:00 p.m. ET, in which they must be accompanied by a person over the age of 23. This curfew was implemented as a response to disturbances caused by crowds of teenagers in the mall. On December 11, 2023, PREIT filed for bankruptcy a second time and sold its share of Fashion District Philadelphia to Macerich, giving Macerich full ownership of the mall. Express Factory Outlet closed in April 2024 due to Chapter 11 bankruptcy and liquidation.

In May 2025, Forever 21 closed its store at Fashion District because the company announced that it was liquidating all of its stores in the U.S. after filing for Chapter 11 bankruptcy. In August 2025, Macerich partnered with the CBRE Group to handle leasing to fill in the mall's over 50% vacancy on inline stores. Fashion District Philadelphia itself is over 75% leased. REC Philly closed in November 2025 because of sustainability issues.

== Transit connections ==
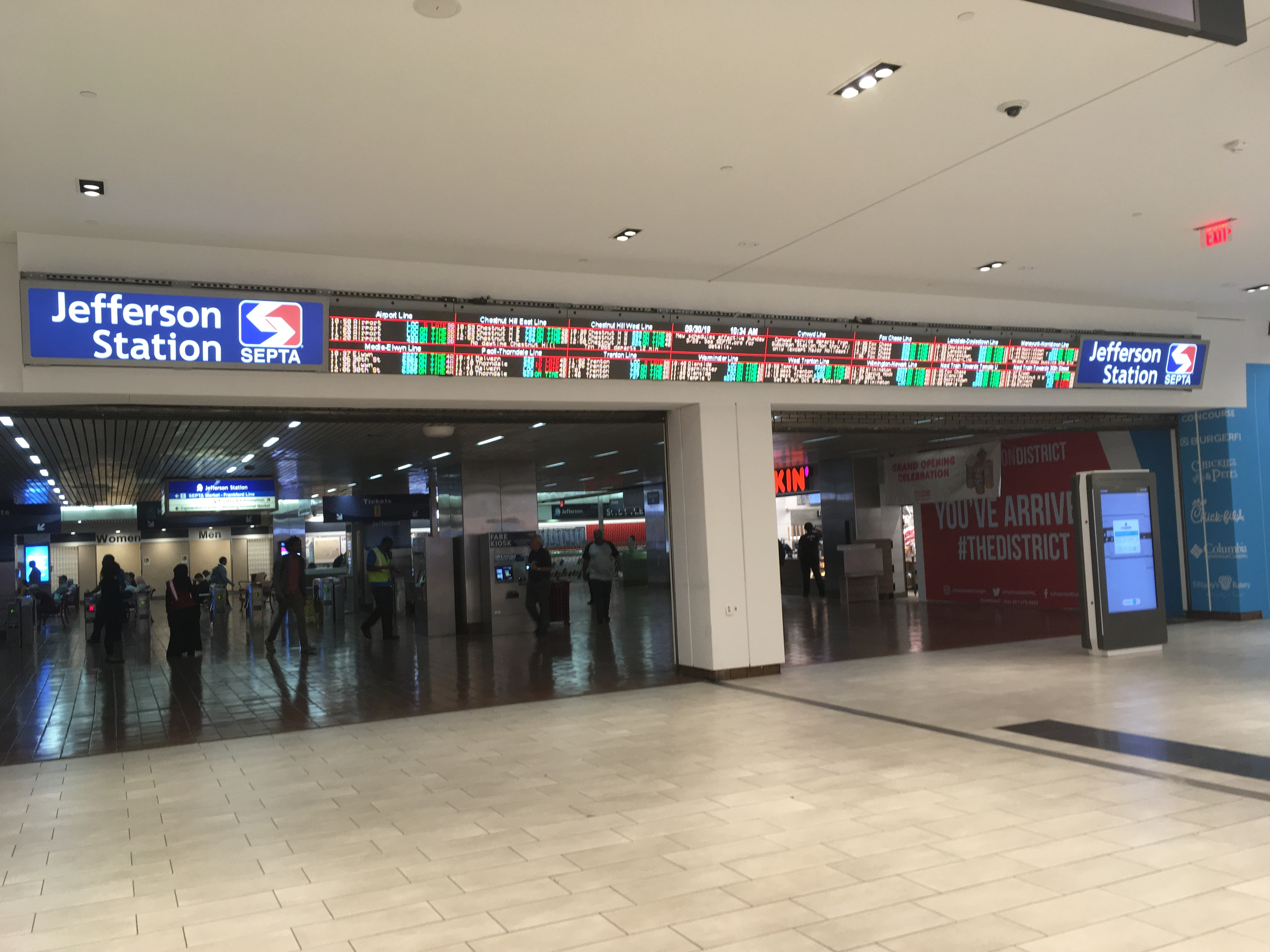
Entrance to Jefferson Station from Fashion District Philadelphia

The following rail stations are connected to Fashion District Philadelphia:

- 8th St Station — SEPTA Market–Frankford Line, SEPTA Broad–Ridge Spur, PATCO Speedline
- 11th St Station — SEPTA Market–Frankford Line
- Jefferson Station — SEPTA Regional Rail

Besides the SEPTA rail connections, various SEPTA city bus routes and NJ Transit bus routes have stops next to Fashion District Philadelphia.

Intercity bus companies and some NJ Transit bus operate at the recently reopened Philadelphia Greyhound Terminal, now known as the PPA Bus Terminal.

== See also ==
- The Gallery at Harborplace, which was also developed by The Rouse Company
