= Philadelphia Greyhound Terminal =

Intercity bus station in Philadelphia

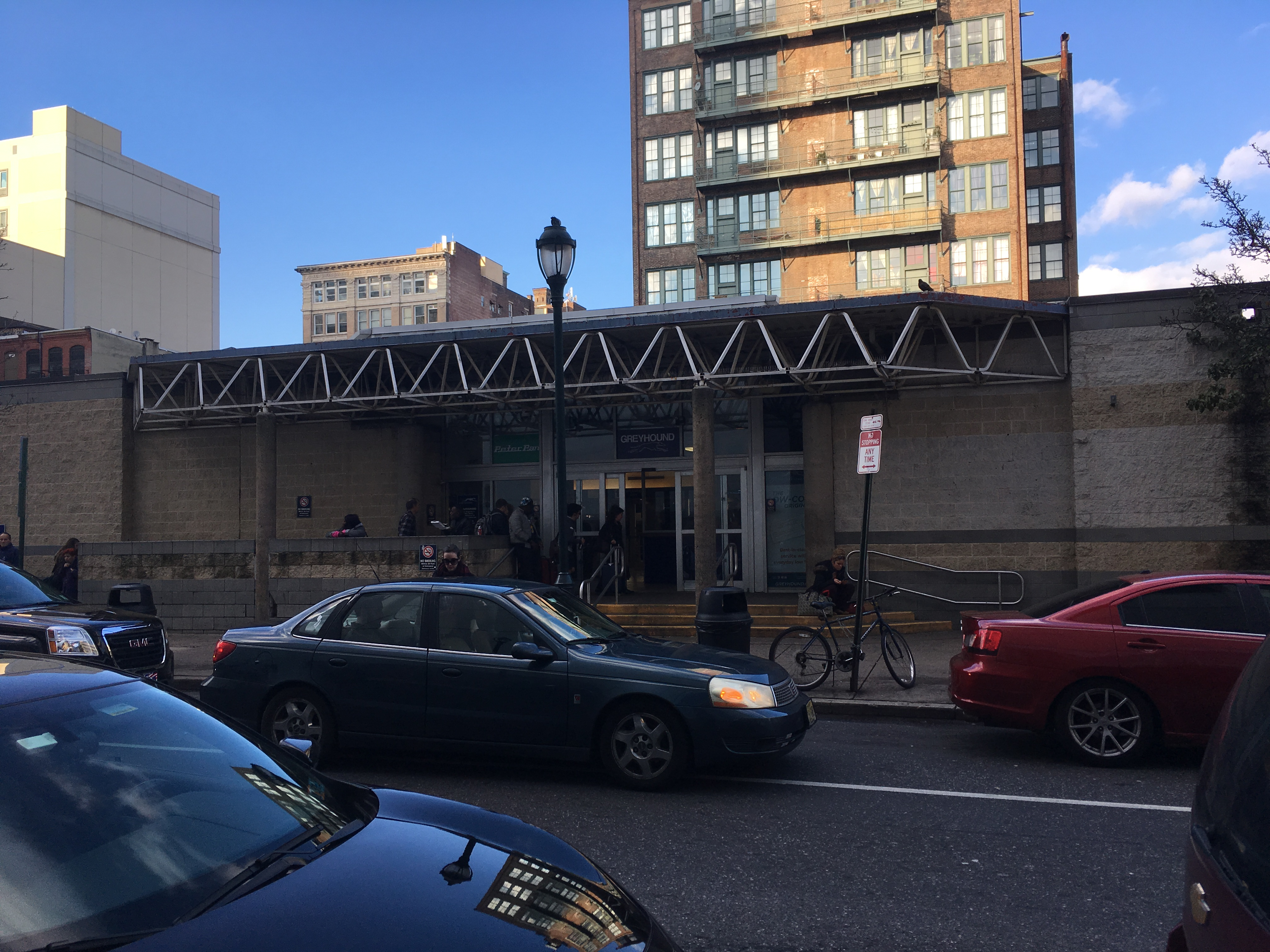
- Philadelphia Greyhound Terminal in November 2018

General information
- Location: 1001 Filbert Street; Philadelphia, Pennsylvania, 19107
- Coordinates: 39.9529°N 75.1571°W
- System: Intercity bus terminal
- Owner: 1001-1025 West Filbert Street L.L.C.
- Operator: Philadelphia Parking Authority
- Platforms: 11 bus bays
- Bus routes: New Jersey Transit Bus: 313, 315, 317, 551
- Bus operators: Greyhound Lines; FlixBus; Fullington Trailways; Martz Trailways; OurBus; Peter Pan Bus Lines
- Connections: Regional Rail (at Jefferson); SEPTA Metro: (11th Street); SEPTA Metro: (8th–Market); SEPTA City Bus; NJ Transit regional and suburban buses to South Jersey

Construction
- Accessible: yes

Other information
- Status: Reopened; Staffed 24/7
- Website: philapark.org/bus/

History
- Opened: 1988; May 1, 2026
- Closed: June 23, 2023-April 30, 2026
- Rebuilt: May 1, 2026
Location

The Philadelphia Greyhound Terminal (currently operating as the Philadelphia Parking Authority Transportation Center) is the primary intercity bus station in Philadelphia, Pennsylvania.

The station contains seating areas, full service ticket counters, food and beverage vending machines, televisions, a lactation pod, and restrooms.

The station closed on June 23, 2023 but has since reopened on May 1, 2026 in anticipation of the many events occurring in Philadelphia for the United States Semiquincentennial. It is now operated by the Philadelphia Parking Authority.

== History ==
=== 20th century ===
The site of the Philadelphia Greyhound Terminal was originally the location of the Harrison Stores building, which burned down in 1984 while under renovation. In 1985, the building was demolished and replaced with the bus station. Prior to this, the Greyhound bus station was at the current site of the BNY Mellon Center at 1735 Market Street.

=== 21st century ===
In 2013 the terminal was the third-busiest Greyhound bus station in the U.S.

On August 2, 2022, it was announced that the Philadelphia 76ers planned to buy the site of the Philadelphia Greyhound Terminal in order to construct the 76 Place at Market East arena that was planned to open in 2031 (the arena project was abandoned in January 2025). Walsh As a result, the Greyhound terminal would have to relocate, with possible locations including the former Philadelphia Police Department headquarters at 750 Race Street and the area of 30th Street Station.

On June 27, 2023, Greyhound moved their bus terminal from 10th and Filbert streets to a storefront along Market Street between 6th and 7th streets. The move was made as part of Greyhound shifting from a model with terminal bus stops to curbside bus stops. The curbside stop along Market Street, which served Greyhound, Peter Pan, and Flixbus, consisted of a building with ticket machines and an office staffed by agents, with the buses stopping along the curb. The stop did not have restrooms or a shelter to protect riders waiting for buses from the elements. The relocation of the bus terminal to a curbside stop drew criticism from riders.

== Intercity Bus services ==
=== National provider ===
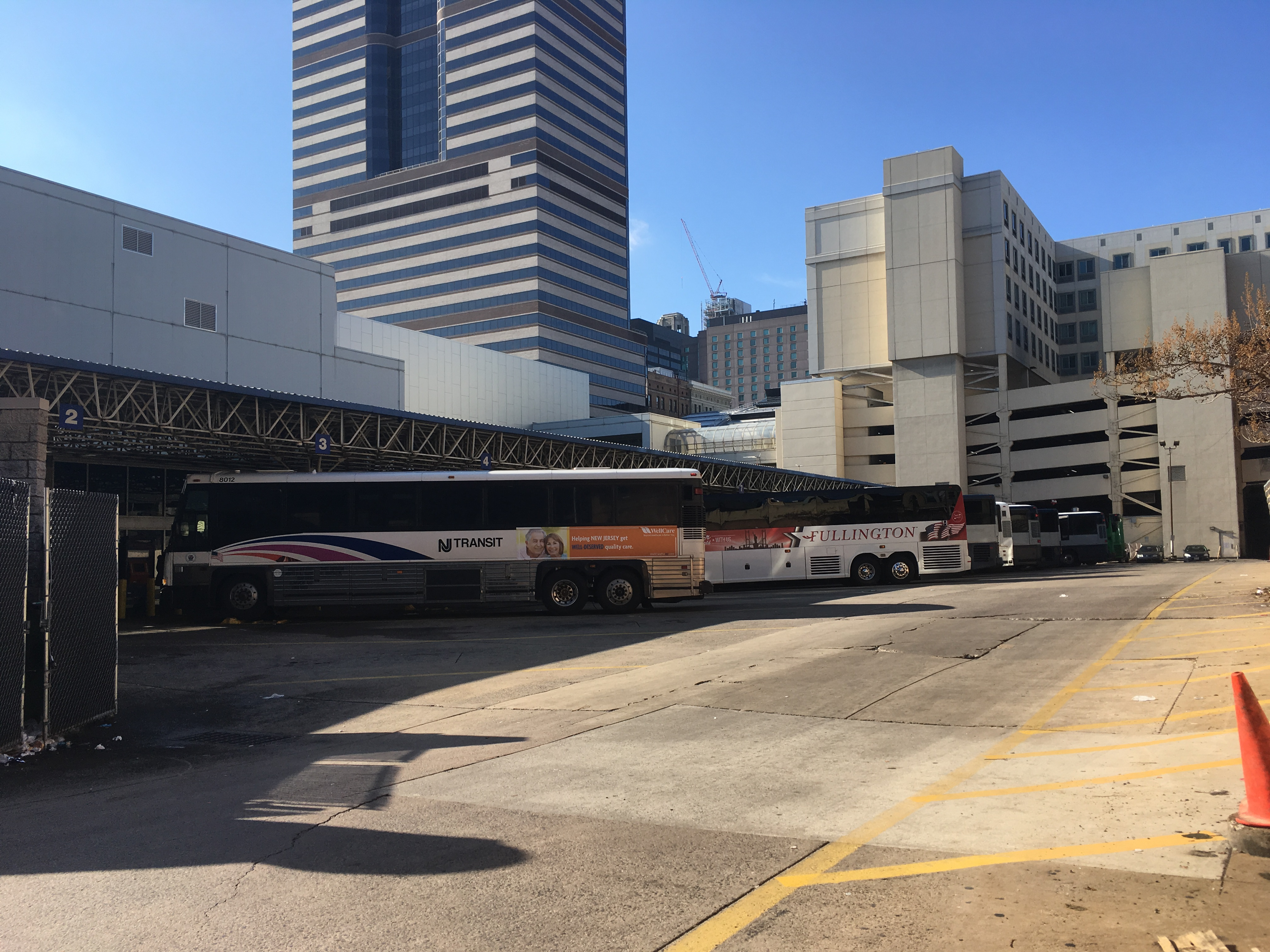
Bus gates at Philadelphia Greyhound Terminal

- Greyhound Lines, the primary intercity bus carrier in the United States, Greyhound provides direct, one seat ride service between the bus terminal and a number of cities and towns both within and outside of Pennsylvania. Some of those cities and large towns include:
  - In Pennsylvania, Allentown, Doylestown, Easton, Harrisburg, Norristown, Pittsburgh, Scranton, Stroudsburg
  - Outside of Pennsylvania, Atlanta, Atlantic City, Baltimore, Boston, Charlotte, Columbus, Dayton, Indianapolis, Newark, New York, Norfolk, Raleigh, Richmond, St. Louis, Washington, Wilmington

Greyhound, and its parent company, Flixbus also provide connecting service to other in-state and out-of-state destinations via transfers.

=== Interregional providers ===
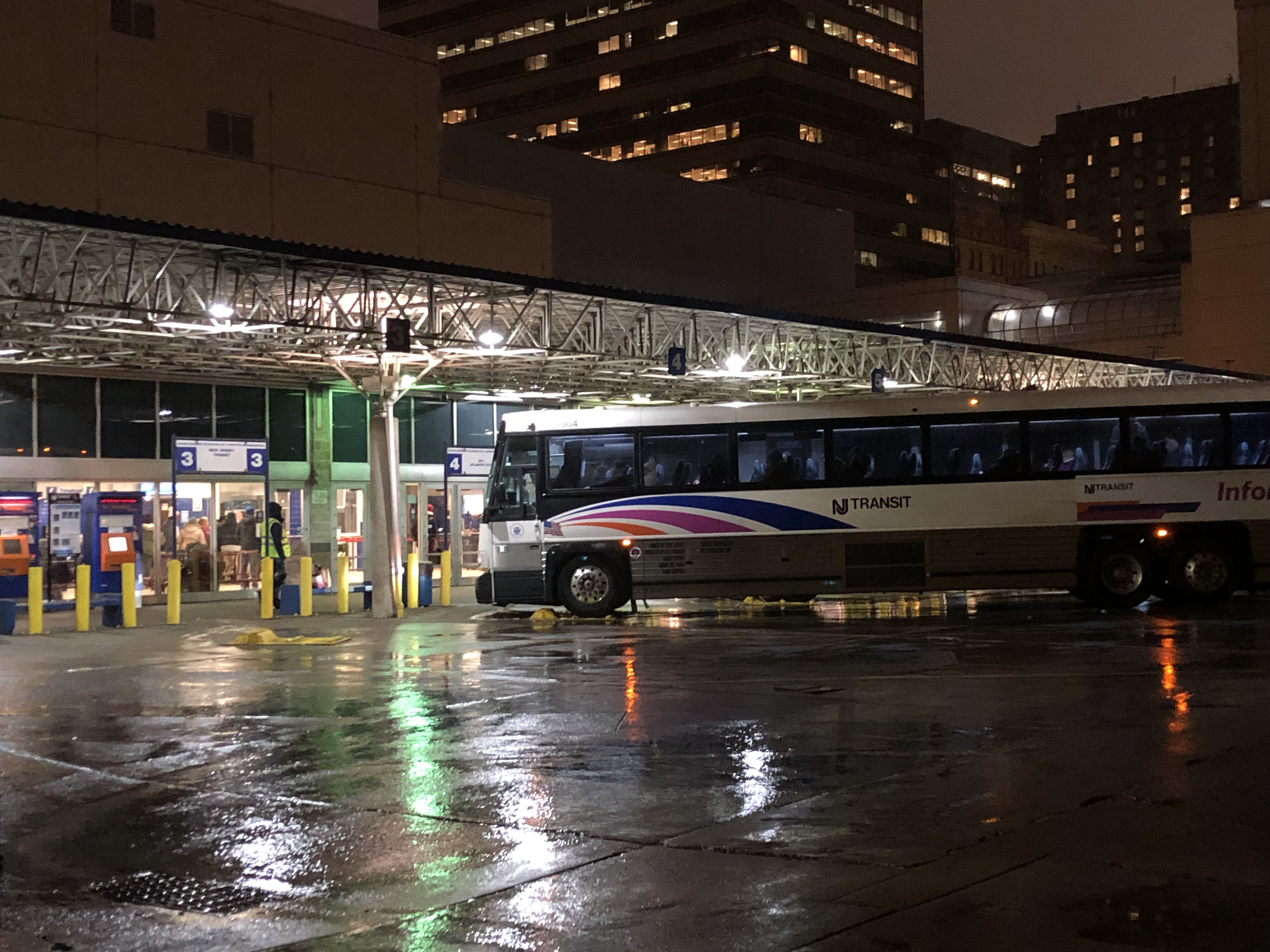
A NJ Transit bus at Philadelphia Greyhound Terminal

Various interregional bus companies also provided direct service to and from the Philadelphia bus terminal. The companies and some of the key locations they served included:

- Fullington Trailways - Allentown, Bloomsburg, Clearfield, Danville, DuBois, Hazleton, Harrisburg, Jim Thorpe, King of Prussia, Lewisburg, Lewistown, Lehighton, Lock Haven, Philipsburg, Quakertown, State College, Williamsport
- Martz Trailways - Allentown, Quakertown, Scranton, White Haven, Wilkes-Barre (service also operates at 30th Street Station)
- Peter Pan Bus Lines - Baltimore, New York City, Washington, D.C. (pooled service with Greyhound ended 27 September 2017)

Like Greyhound, the Trailways providers' services connect with other bus routes in the Greyhound/Trailways system to allow trips to other regional and national destinations.

=== Regional providers ===
- NJ Transit - the statewide transit provider in New Jersey, NJ Transit (or NJT) operates a number of long-distance routes between points within the state and the Philadelphia bus terminal. Those routes and key cities and towns along the routes include:
  - 313 - Camden, Glassboro, Vineland, Millville, Wildwood, Cape May
  - 315 - Camden, Mays Landing, Wildwood, Cape May
  - 317 - Camden, Mount Holly, Lakewood, Asbury Park
  - 551 - Camden, Blackwood, Sicklerville, Atlantic City

Prior to the 2023 closure, NJ Transit formerly provided regional bus service to the Philadelphia Greyhound Terminal via routes 313, 315, 316, 317, 408, 409, and 551. NJ Transit service ended on February 28, 2022 due to the reconfiguration of the bus station. The 551 bus was changed to start at 10th and Market streets while, in the interim period, the remaining buses were changed to start at the Walter Rand Transportation Center in Camden, New Jersey, with free transfers to buses operating into Philadelphia. Since then, routes 317, 408, and 409 were restored to serve Market Street, Broad Street and Vine Street. Bus route 316 begins and ends at 30th Street Station. On September 5, 2026, the 313, 315, 317 and 551 service is restored to begin and end at this station. All inbound buses to this station are allowed to make drop offs at 6th and Race Street and along Market Street only up to 10th Street before arriving at the station. All New Jersey bound buses pickup only at this station.

== Connections ==
The Philadelphia Greyhound Terminal offered connections to SEPTA Regional Rail at Jefferson Station and the Market–Frankford Line at 11th Street station. Several SEPTA bus routes (17, 23, 33, 38, 44, 48, and 61) stop one block away from the terminal on Market Street. In addition, several NJ Transit bus routes (400, 401, 402, 404, 406, 410, 412, 414, 417, and 555) stop in Center City Philadelphia as close as one block from the Greyhound Bus Terminal on Market Street.
