= Jefferson Station (SEPTA) =

SEPTA Regional Rail station in Philadelphia

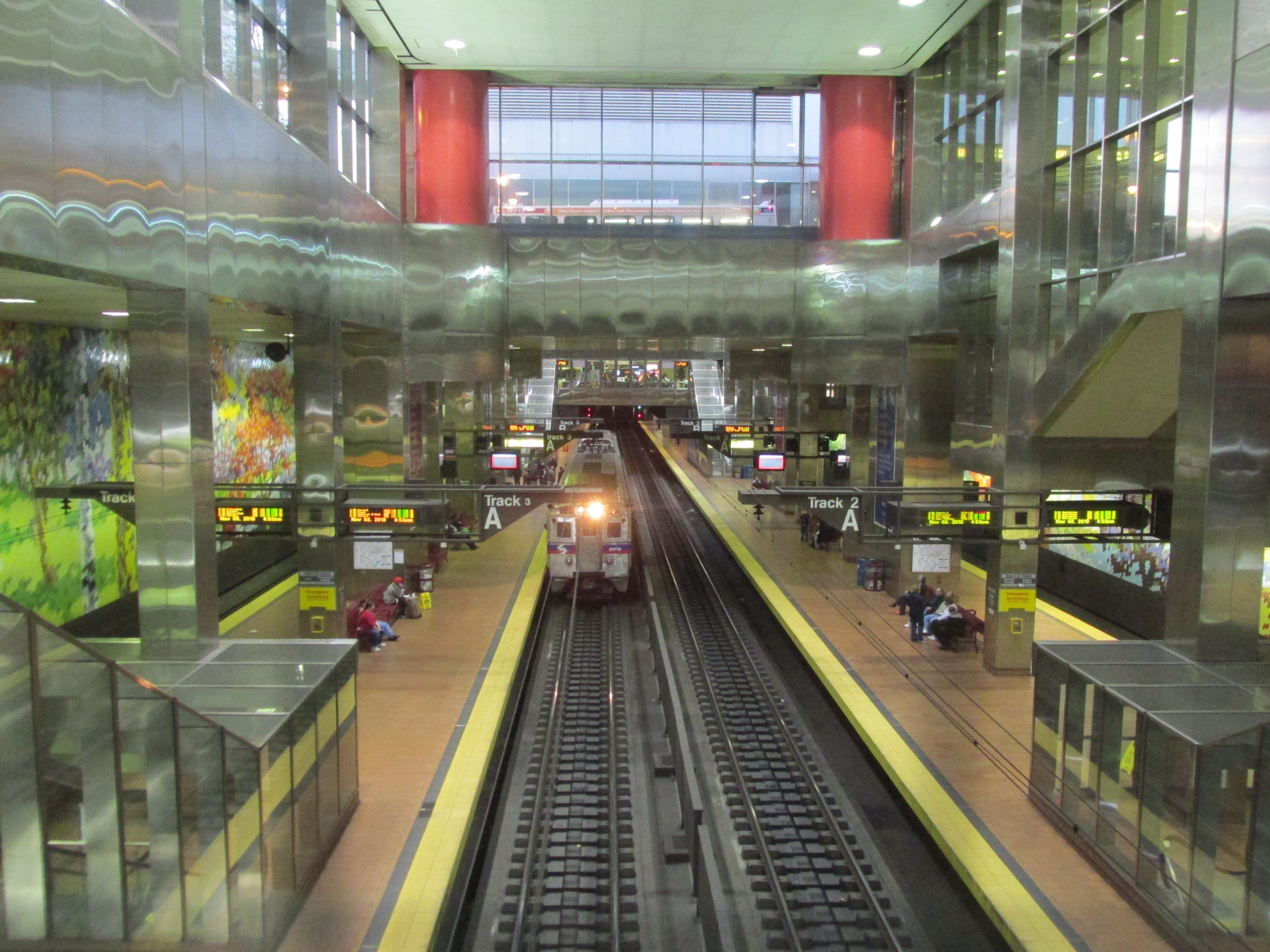
- Jefferson Station platforms as viewed from the concourse level

General information
- Location: Market Street between 10th and 12th Streets; Philadelphia, Pennsylvania
- Coordinates: 39°57′09″N 75°09′29″W
- Owner: SEPTA
- Line: SEPTA Main Line (Center City Commuter Connection)
- Platforms: 2 island platforms
- Tracks: 4
- Connections: SEPTA Metro: (11th Street) SEPTA Metro: (8th–Market); PATCO (8th & Market); Philadelphia Greyhound Terminal; SEPTA City Bus: 17, 23, 33, 38, 44, 47, 48, 61; NJ Transit Bus: 313, 315, 316, 317, 400, 401, 402, 404, 406, 408, 409, 410, 412, 414, 417, 551, 555

Construction
- Cycle facilities: 22 rack spaces
- Accessible: Yes

Other information
- Station code: 90006
- Fare zone: CC

History
- Opened: November 12, 1984
- Electrified: 1984
- Former names: Market East (1984–2014)

Passengers
- 2017: 12,122 boardings, 12,122 alightings (weekday average)
- Rank: 2 of 146

Services
Preceding station	SEPTA	Following station
Suburban Station toward Airport	Airport Line	Temple University toward Glenside
Suburban Station toward Chestnut Hill West	Chestnut Hill West Line	Temple University Terminus
Suburban Station toward Wawa Station	Media/Wawa Line	Temple University Terminus
Suburban Station toward Thorndale	Paoli/Thorndale Line	Temple University Terminus
Suburban Station toward Trenton	Trenton Line	Temple University Terminus
Suburban Station toward Newark	Wilmington/Newark Line	Temple University Terminus
Suburban Station toward 30th Street Station	Chestnut Hill East Line	Temple University toward Chestnut Hill East
Suburban Station toward Penn Medicine Station	Fox Chase Line	Temple University toward Fox Chase
Suburban Station toward Penn Medicine Station	Lansdale/Doylestown Line	Temple University toward Doylestown
Suburban Station toward Penn Medicine Station	Manayunk/Norristown Line	Temple University toward Norristown–Elm Street
Suburban Station toward Penn Medicine Station	Warminster Line	Temple University toward Warminster
Suburban Station toward Penn Medicine Station	West Trenton Line	Temple University toward West Trenton
Track layout
- Filbert St. is omitted
Location

Jefferson Station (formerly named Market East Station) is an underground SEPTA Regional Rail station located on Market Street in Philadelphia, Pennsylvania. It is the easternmost of the three Center City stations of the SEPTA Regional Rail system and is part of the Center City Commuter Connection, which connects the former Penn Central commuter lines with the former Reading Company commuter lines. In 2014, the station saw approximately 26,000 passengers every weekday.

Jefferson Health, whose Thomas Jefferson University Hospital is a few blocks away, purchased the naming rights to the station in September 2014. The health system's logo, a silhouette of the former president, appears alongside the station's name in most locations.

== History ==
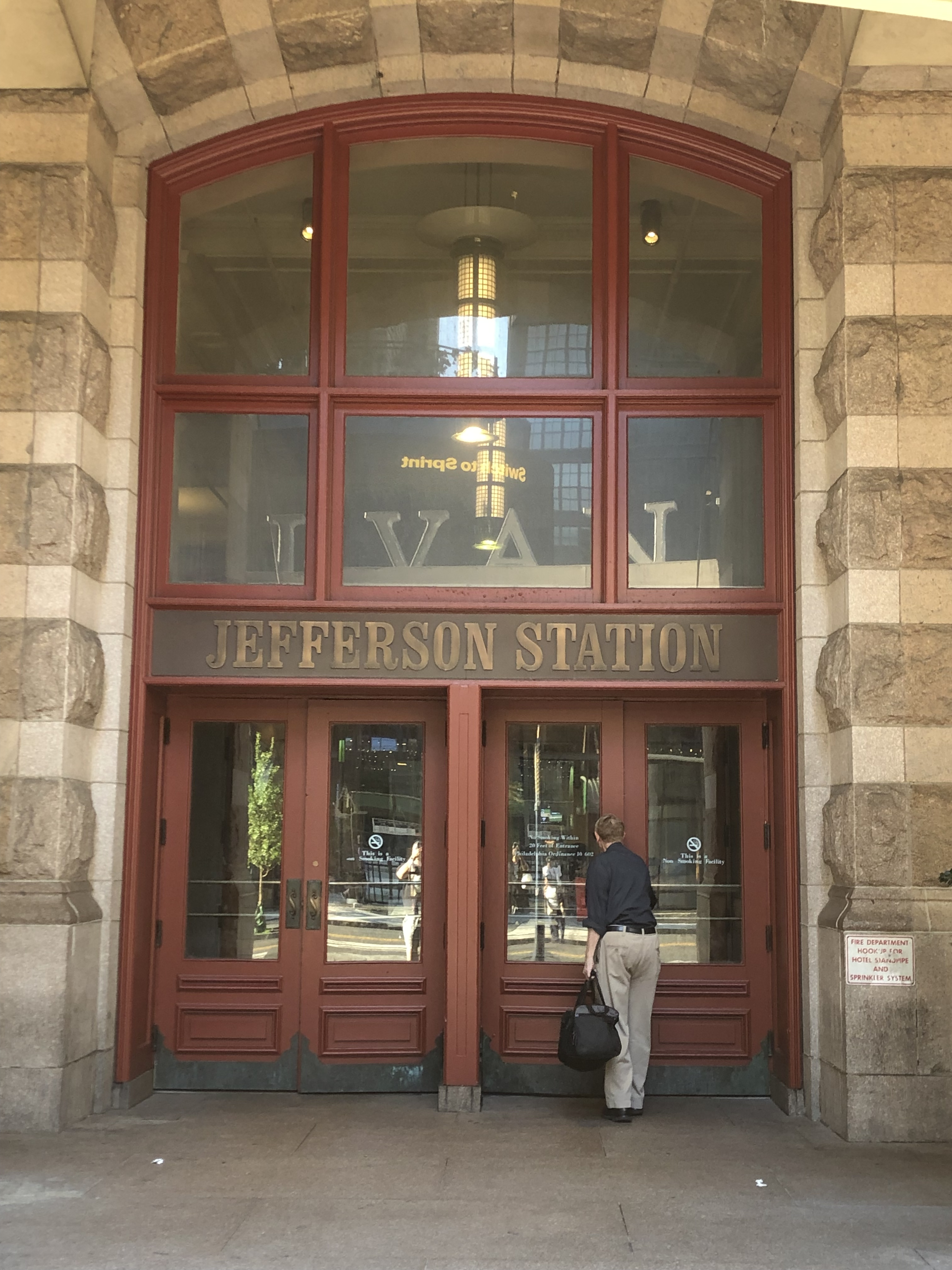
12th and Market streets entrance in the Reading Terminal building

Market East Station was built as part of the $300-million Center City Commuter Connection project, which constructed a tunnel between the former Suburban Station and an existing viaduct near Temple University station and unified commuter rail service in Philadelphia. The tunnel included provisions for an "11th Street Station." During planning stages, the station was named Market East, a name sometimes used to refer to the retail corridor on Market Street east of City Hall. During construction in May 1984, the tunnel suffered minor damage due to an above-ground fire in an abandoned building on 10th Street.

The station opened on November 10, 1984, replacing the 1893-built Reading Terminal, which had closed four days earlier. Part of the station actually sits below the Reading Terminal building, which still houses Reading Terminal Market and also now includes part of the Pennsylvania Convention Center. When the convention center first opened in 1993, a new entrance to the station was built into the Reading Terminal headhouse at the northeast corner of 12th and Market streets.

In July 2012, Amtrak identified Market East as its preferred Philadelphia station for a future high-speed rail line along the Northeast Corridor between Boston South Station and Washington Union Station. The new corridor would be built with fewer curves, allowing for trains to achieve much higher speeds and eventually reach the goal of a 37-minute trip between Philadelphia and New York Penn Station.

Rumors first circulated in August 2014 that the station would be renamed. On September 4, 2014, SEPTA announced the station's renaming from Market East to Jefferson, after Jefferson Health – whose Thomas Jefferson University Hospital is a few blocks from the station – purchased the naming rights. The length of the $4 million contract for the Jefferson Station name is five years, with the option to keep it for an additional four years for $3.4 million. This was SEPTA's second naming rights sale; Pattison station was renamed AT&T station in 2010, and is now named NRG station.

The station is connected to the concourse level of Fashion District Philadelphia, a shopping mall that replaced the Gallery at Market East mall in September 2019. The station was connected to the Gallery II (the mall's 1984 expansion) section of the mall, and the design of the new mall preserved the connection to Jefferson Station.

== Services ==
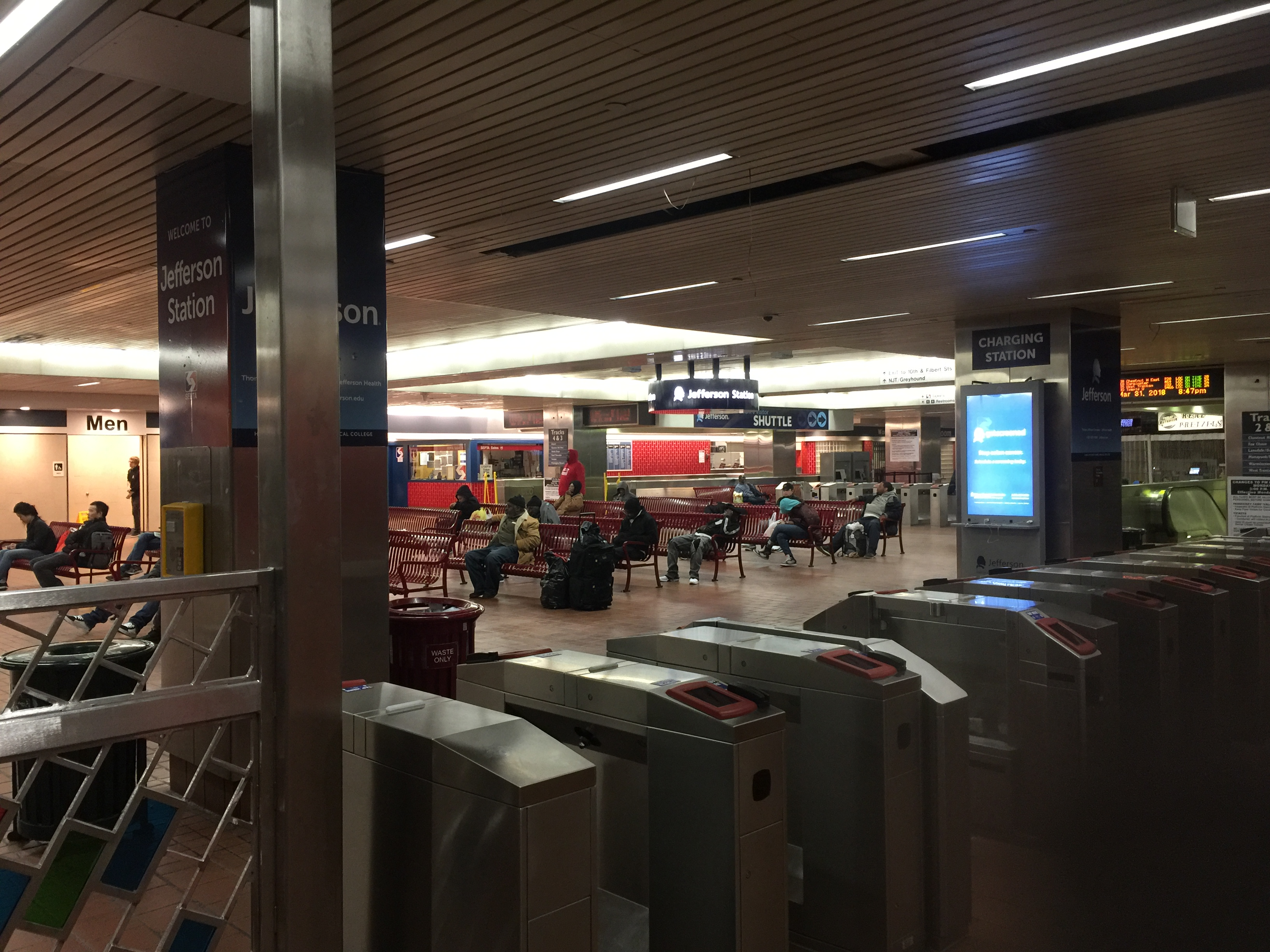
Waiting area on the concourse level in 2018, showing newly installed SEPTA Key turnstiles.

Jefferson Station is served by all Regional Rail lines except the limited-service Cynwyd Line, which terminates at Suburban Station. In FY 2005, the average total weekday boardings at this station was 11,848, making it the second busiest station in the Regional Rail system.

Through the Fashion District mall, Jefferson Station is connected to SEPTA's Market–Frankford Line and Broad–Ridge Spur subway lines, as well as the PATCO Speedline. The Market–Frankford Line has two adjacent stops at 11th Street and 8th–Market, the latter of which is shared with the Ridge Spur and PATCO lines. Through the Downtown Link concourse, there are also underground corridors connecting to the 13th Street and 15th Street/City Hall on the Market–Frankford and subway–surface lines, as well as 15th Street/City Hall on the Broad Street Line.

Jefferson Station is located adjacent to multiple surface bus routes operated by both SEPTA and NJ Transit. Additionally, the Philadelphia Greyhound Terminal is located immediately north of the station across Filbert Street. On June 26, 2023, Greyhound closed the terminal building and relocated its Philadelphia services to 6th and Market. On May 1, 2026, the Philadelphia Parking Authority reopened the terminal building and Greyhound and other intercity bus services returned to serving that station.

== Station layout ==
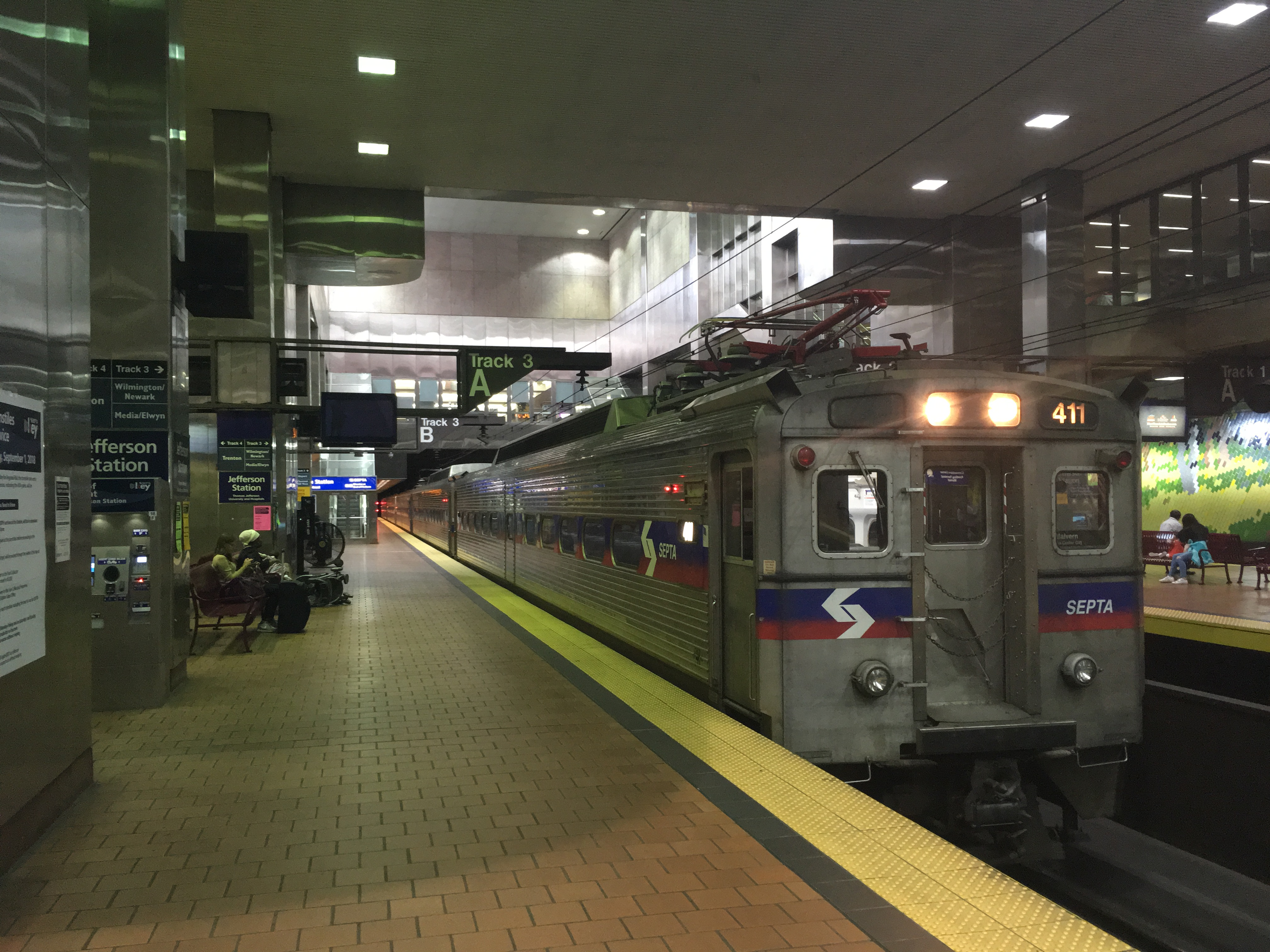
An outbound Paoli/Thorndale Line train at the station in 2018

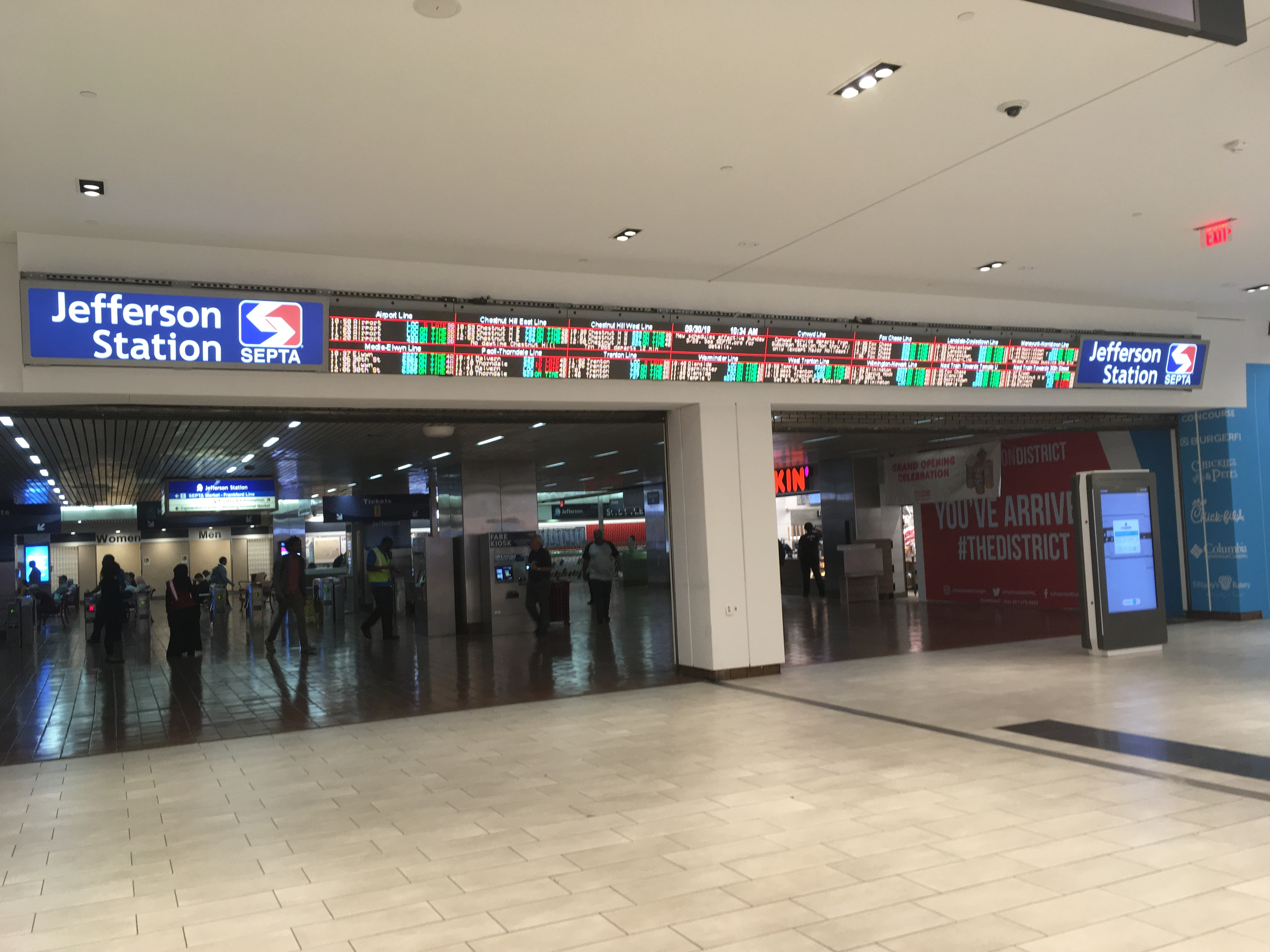
Entrance from the Fashion District Philadelphia shopping mall

Stainless steel and large plate-glass windows are a major design element throughout the station's concourse, with large color tile murals depicting the four seasons adorning the walls. The upper seating area contains benches facing windows that look down onto the tracks. These windows admit light from the street down to track level much like a clerestory, although this natural light only fills a small portion of the station.

On the track level, Jefferson has two 35-foot (11 m) wide island platforms and four tracks. Each 850-foot (260 m) platform, long enough for ten railcars, is divided into "A" and "B" sections so that two different Regional Rail trains may utilize the same track at the same time.

To the west, the tracks have a set of cross-over tracks that allow trains to change tracks before they reach Suburban Station, located about 0.5 miles (0.80 km) west at 16th Street and John F. Kennedy Boulevard. To the east, there is a sharp curve north where trains are limited to about 20 to 25 mph (32 to 40 km/h), and then another set of cross-overs before climbing a 2.5% incline towards the elevated Temple University station.

== Image gallery ==
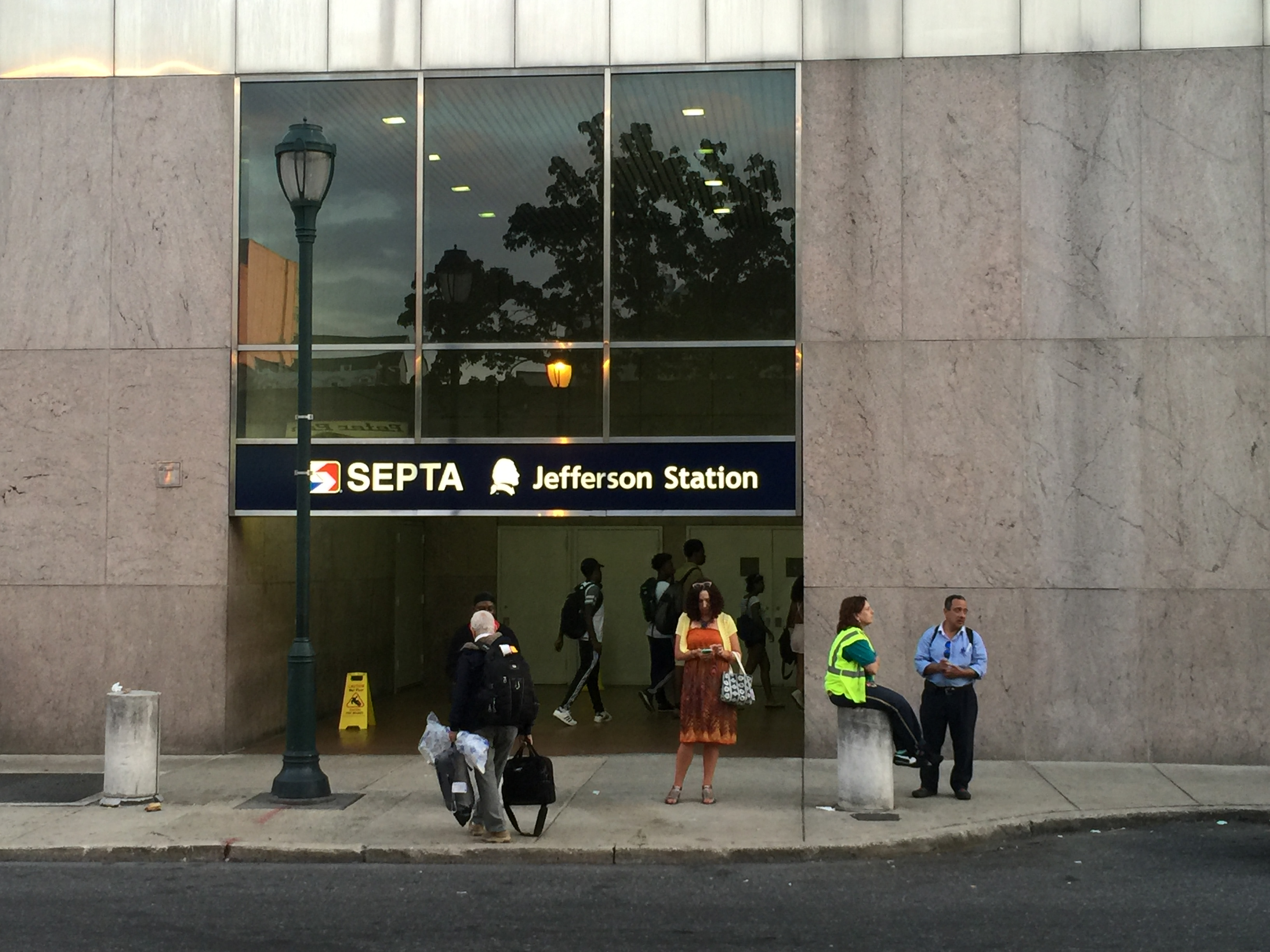
Filbert Street entrance

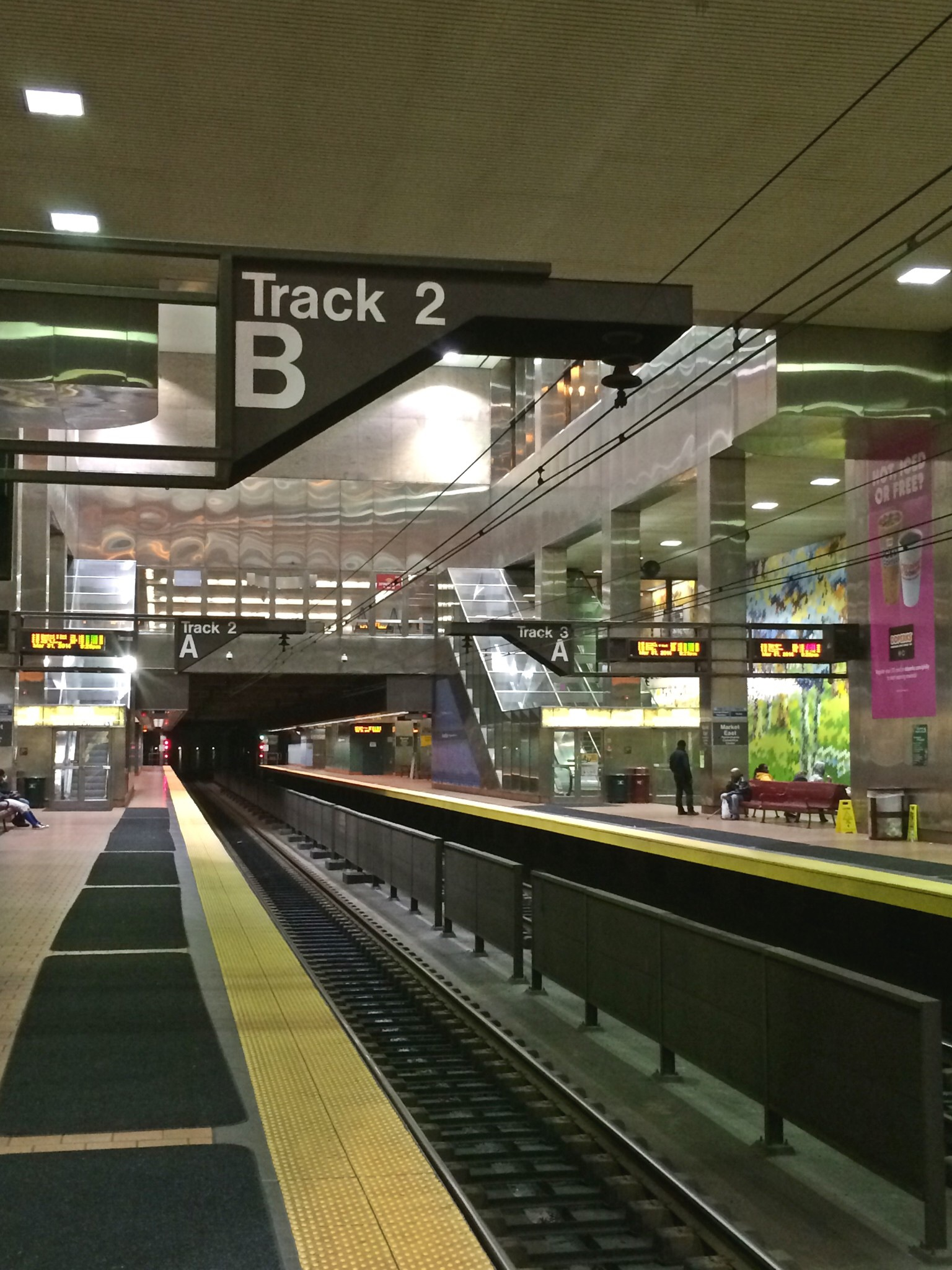
Jefferson Station platform

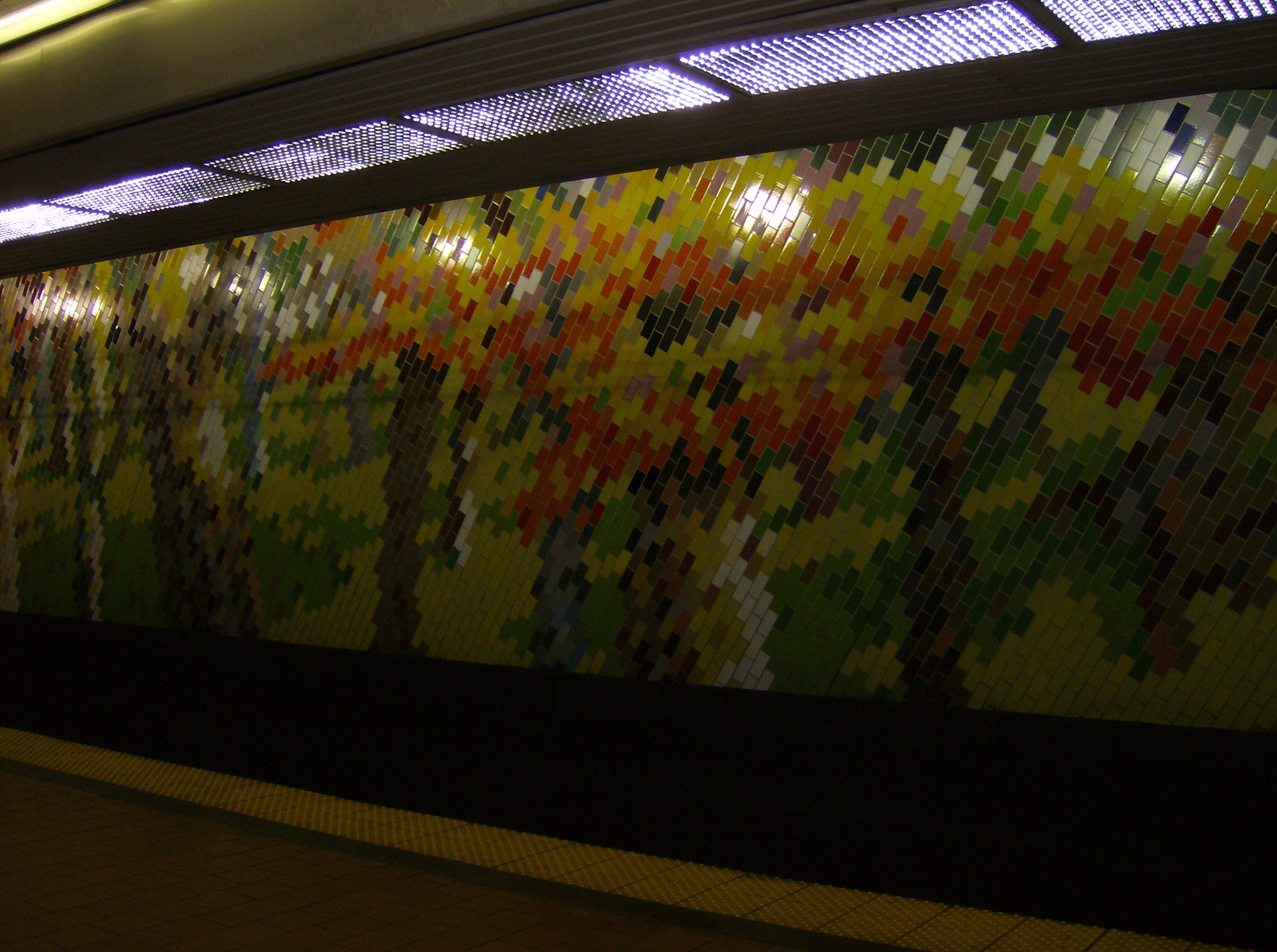
Tiled wall across from boarding platforms

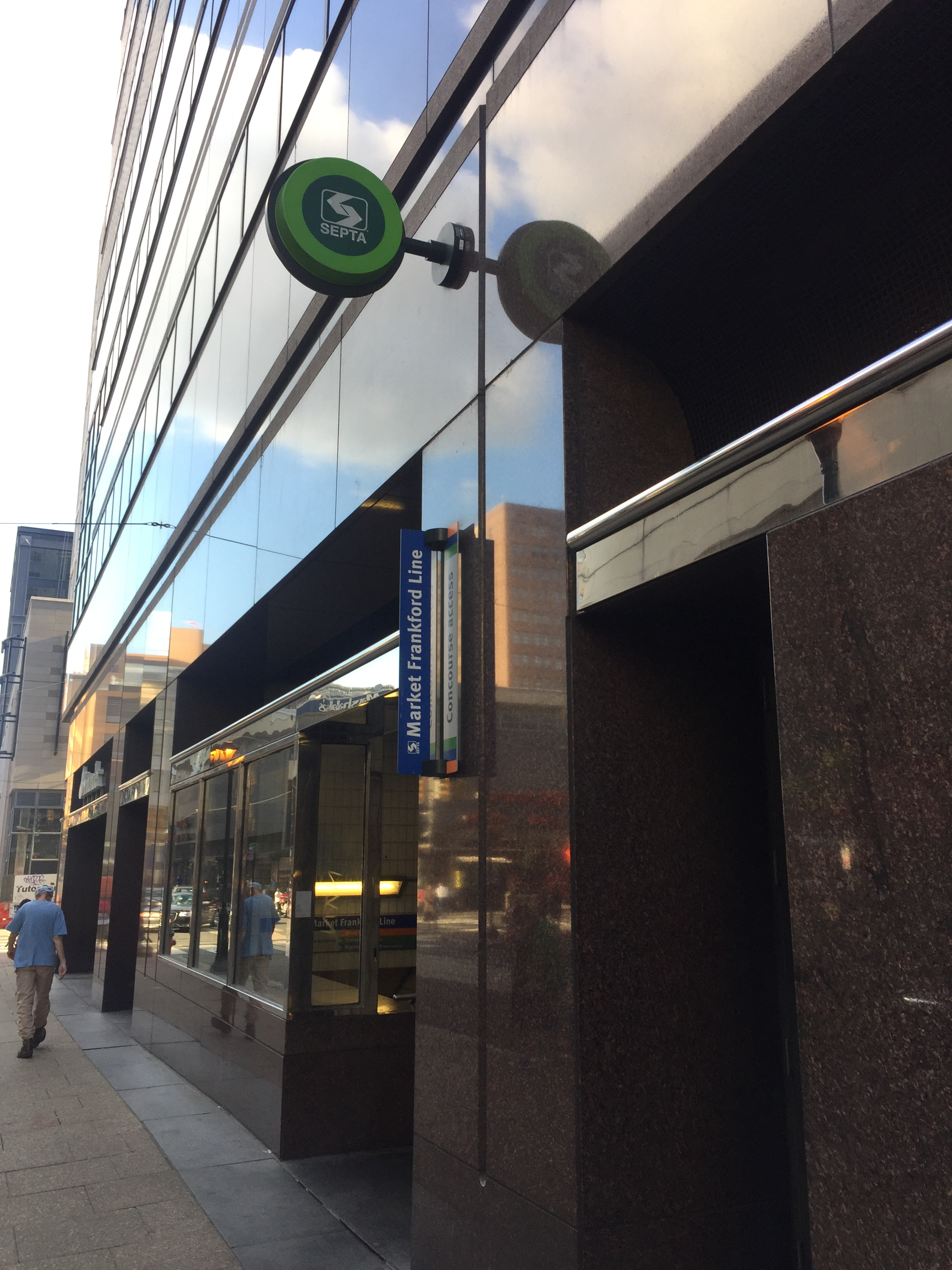
11th Street entrance

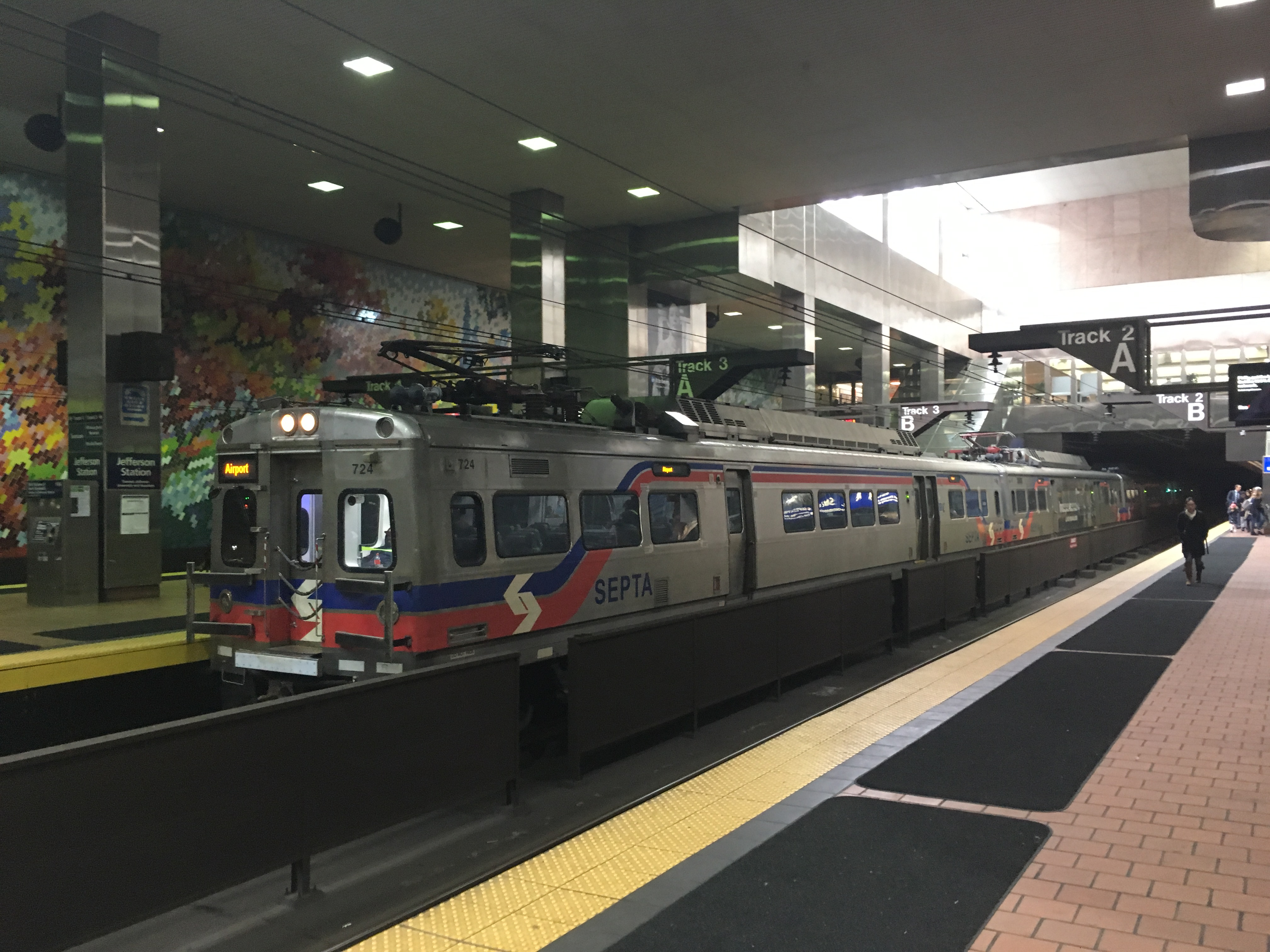
An outbound train on the Airport Line stops at the station in March 2018

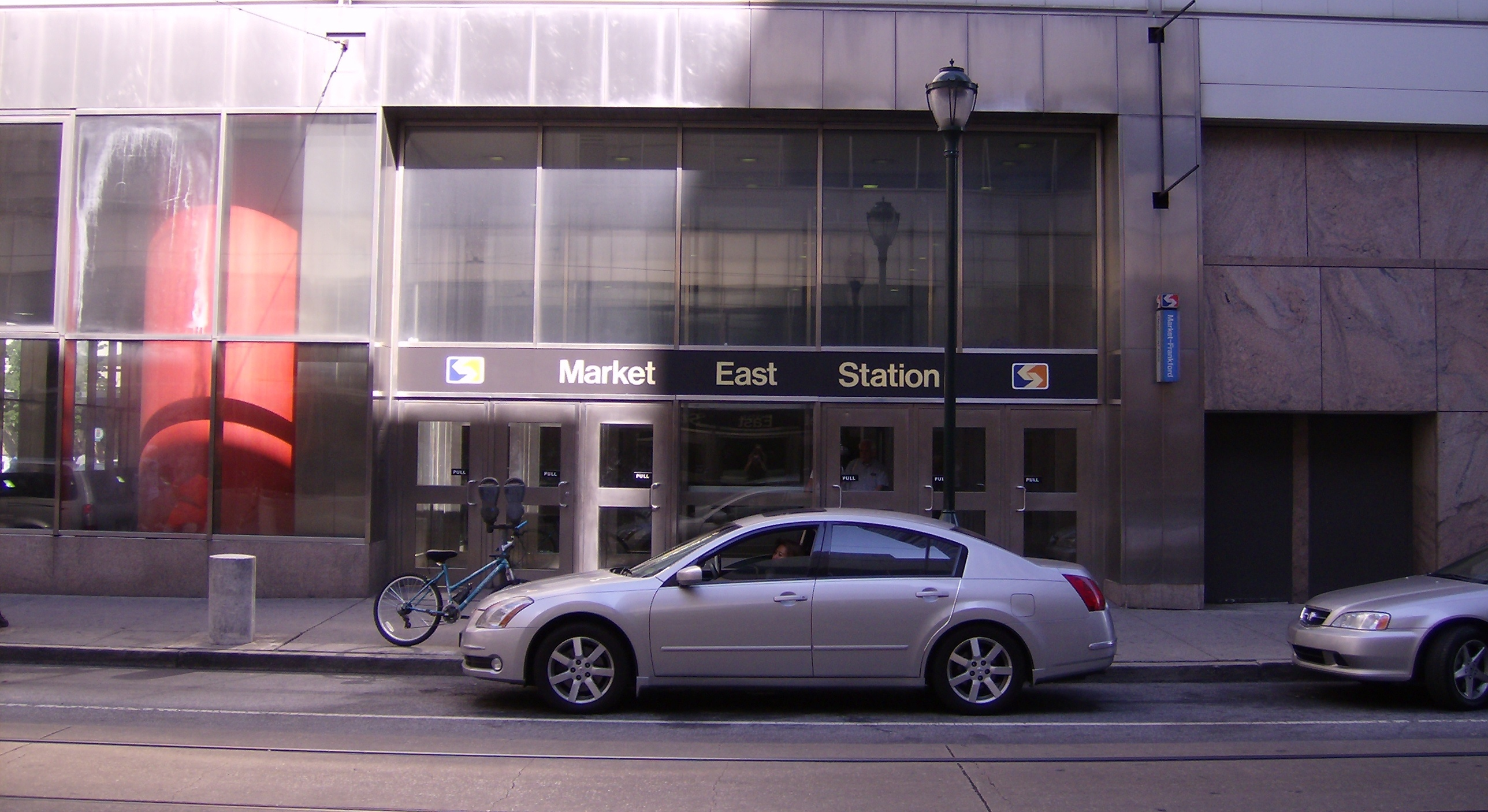
Station entrance sign prior to the name change (1984-2014)
