= 8th–Market station =

Rapid transit station in Philadelphia

8th–Market PATCO
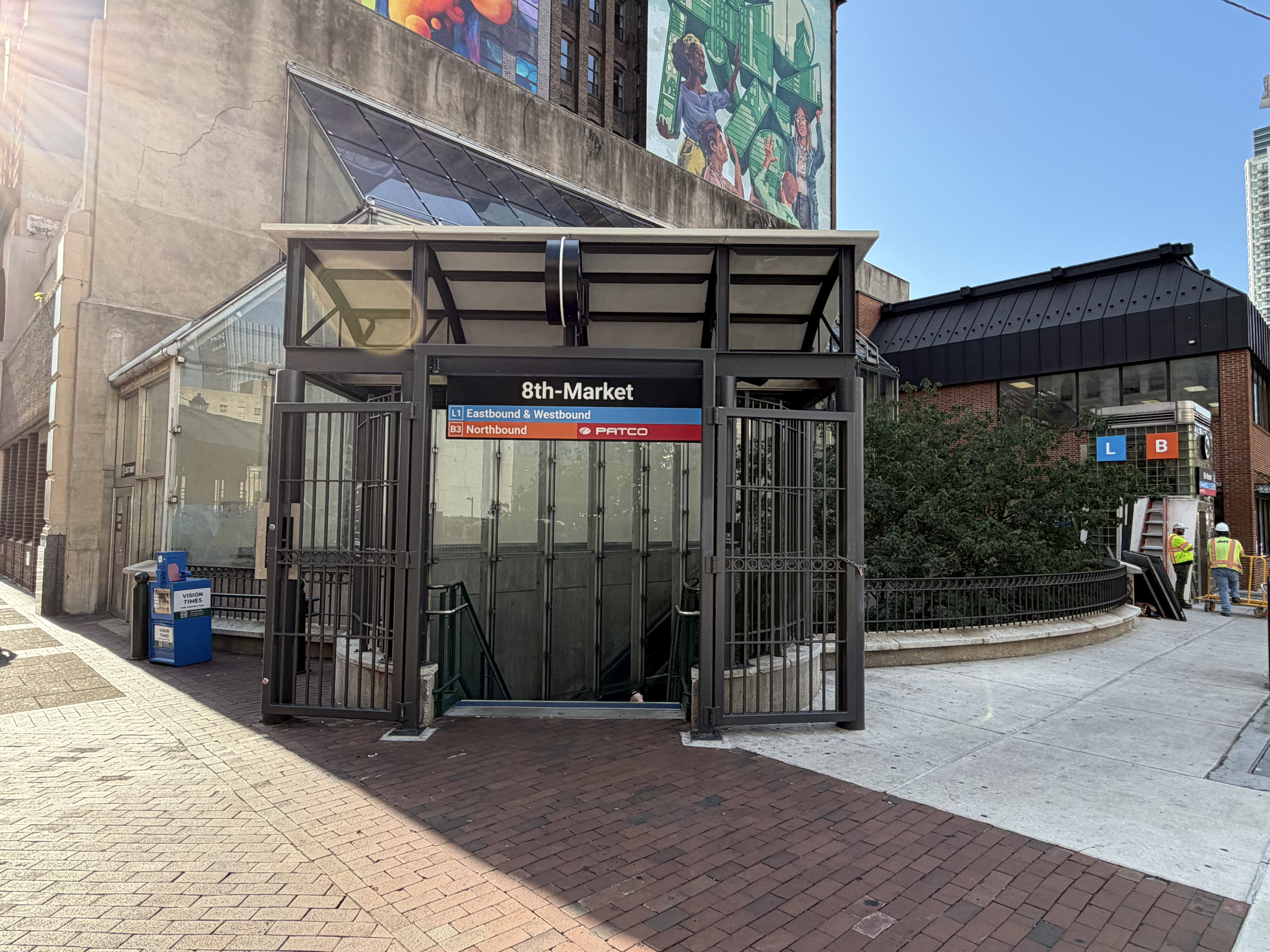
- Station entrance in 2026

General information
- Location: 8th Street at Market Street; Philadelphia, Pennsylvania
- Coordinates: 39.952076°N 75.156612°W
- Owner: City of Philadelphia
- Platforms: 3 side platforms, 1 island platform
- Tracks: 5
- Connections: Regional Rail (at Jefferson Station); SEPTA City Bus: 17, 33, 38, 44, 47, 61; NJ Transit Bus: 316, 400, 401, 402, 404, 406, 408, 409, 410, 412, 414, 417, 555

Construction
- Structure type: Underground
- Cycle facilities: Racks
- Accessible: Yes

History
- Opened: August 3, 1908
- Former names: Market Street (Broad–Ridge); 8th Street (Market–Frankford and Broad–Ridge) (1908–2025)

Key dates
- 1932: Lower level opened
- 1968: Broad Ridge platform added
- 2009: Station renovated for accessibility

Services
Preceding station	SEPTA Metro	Following station
13th Street toward 69th Street T.C.	L (SEPTA Metro)	5th Street/Independence Hall toward Frankford T.C.
11th Street Temporarily closed toward 69th Street T.C.	L (SEPTA Metro)	5th Street/Independence Hall toward Frankford T.C.
Terminus	B (SEPTA Metro)	Chinatown toward Fern Rock T.C.
Preceding station	DRPA	Following station
9–10th & Locust toward 15–16th & Locust	PATCO Speedline	Franklin Square toward Lindenwold
Location

8th–Market station is a rapid transit station complex at the intersection of 8th Street and Market Street in Center City neighborhood of Philadelphia, Pennsylvania. It is served by SEPTA Metro's L and B3 trains, as well as the PATCO Speedline. It is the only station where these three lines intersect. The entire complex is owned by the City of Philadelphia, with the Delaware River Port Authority (owner of PATCO) and SEPTA leasing space for operations.

The station complex comprises three platforms, one for the L, one for B3 trains, and the 8th & Market station on the PATCO Speedline. These are arranged across three underground levels. The upper mezzanine level spans above the L tracks, the middle level accommodates the east-west-running L and the northbound B3, and a lower level serving the PATCO Speedline, which runs north–south. Each platform has fare control and entrances/exits, though they are connected via the shared mezzanine level.

For much of the 20th century, the corner of 8th and Market was a retail hub for the city, home to major department stores including Strawbridge's, Gimbels and Lit Brothers, all of which had direct access to the station complex. Today, that underground connection serves the Fashion District Philadelphia shopping mall, which offers indirect access to SEPTA Regional Rail at Jefferson Station, as well as connections to the B line via the Downtown Link concourse.

== History ==
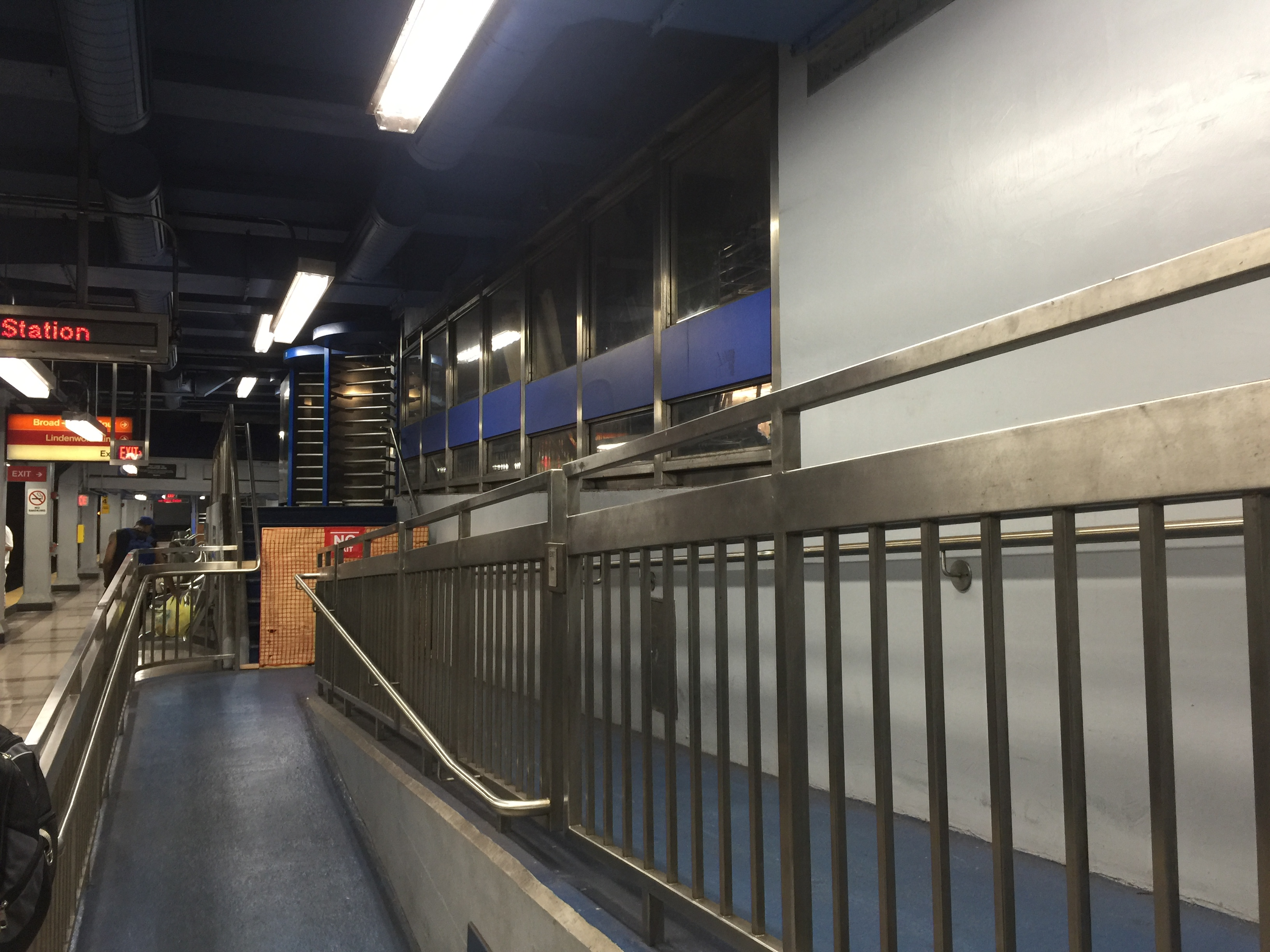
Accessible ramp between a Market–Frankford Line platform and the mezzanine

The east-west upper level platforms (now Market–Frankford Line) opened on August 3, 1908, as part of the first extension of the Philadelphia Rapid Transit Company's 1907-opened Market Street Subway. On December 21, 1932, the Broad-Ridge Spur of the Broad Street Line opened, with its terminus at a new lower-level island platform (signed as Market Street). Bridge Line service to Camden began on June 7, 1936, using a 1932-built tunnel connecting the lower level tracks to the Delaware River Bridge.

Beginning in 1949, Ridge Spur and Bridge Line trains were through-routed, reversing at Market Street station. On February 15, 1953, the Locust Street Subway opened, extending the lower level tracks south and west to 16th and Locust streets. Bridge Line trains were extended to 16th and Locust Streets, while Ridge Spur trains terminated at Market.

In January 1954, due to low ridership on the extension, off-peak service and Saturday again began operating between Girard and Camden, with a shuttle train operating between 8th and 16th stations. Sunday service was suspended at that time due to minimal usage.

Over the weekend of August 23–27, 1968, tracks at the station were reconfigured as part of the construction of the Lindenwold High-Speed Line (PATCO Speedline). Ridge Spur trains were redirected to a new single-track upper level terminus platform, separating the spur from the 8th–Locust Street subway. Bridge Line service was temporarily divided into 16th and Locust–8th Street and 8th Street–Camden segments, with a cross-platform transfer at 8th Street. Bridge Line service was suspended from December 29, 1968, to February 15, 1969, when the new service began.

The station complex was made accessible in 2009. One of the escalators was replaced from spring 2015 to spring 2016 as part of SEPTA's Center City Concourse Improvement Program.

== Station layout ==
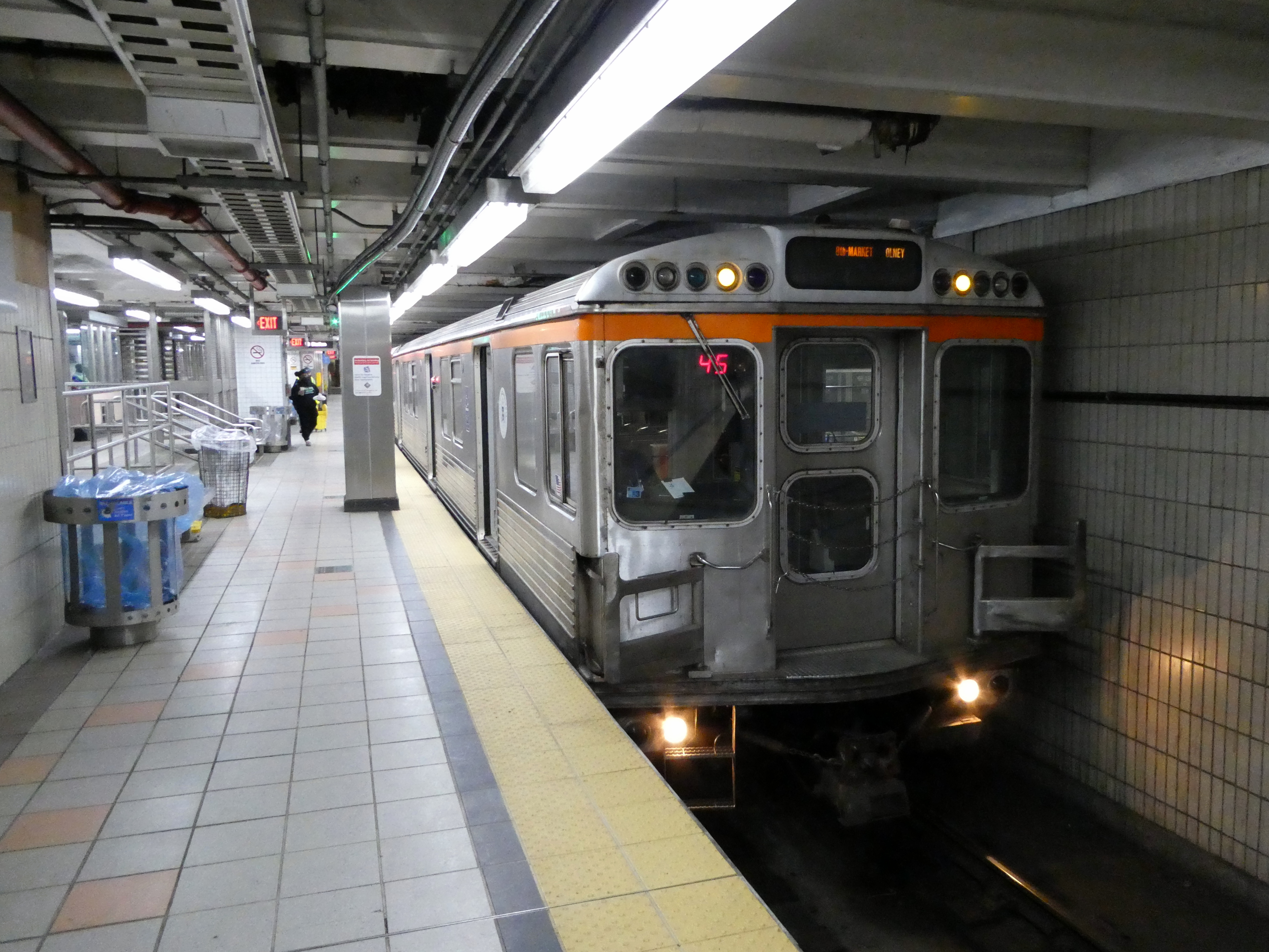
Broad–Ridge Spur train at the station

The Market–Frankford Line's station is located on the upper platform level. There are two side platforms on the north and south sides of the tracks. Passengers may transfer between platforms via an upper mezzanine both inside and outside the paid area of the station. This mezzanine area also connects to the lower level of the Fashion District Philadelphia shopping mall. As a Market–Frankford Line station, columns and accent work throughout the two platforms are painted blue.

The B3 station is the southern terminus of the line. There is a single track and platform located perpendicular and adjacent to the Market–Frankford westbound platform. There is no free connection to the Market–Frankford Line, as the MFL has a free connection to the main B1/B2 at 15th Street/City Hall station. Trains on this platform level formerly used a now-abandoned track to connect to the Locust Street subway (now part of the PATCO Speedline). The station was originally named Market Street, as evidenced by the tile work on the station, and the line was originally named the "Ridge–8th subway" due to its southern terminus at this station. As a Broad Street Line station, columns and accent work on the platform are painted orange.

The lower level of the complex houses PATCO's 8th & Market station. PATCO Speedline trains stop at an island platform perpendicular to the Market–Frankford platforms. There are two fare control barriers located directly underneath each Market–Frankford Line platform. Each fare control area contains a staircase, an elevator, and "up" escalator. Each PATCO platform has a distinct accent color: the 8th & Market accent color is teal.

The Broad–Ridge Spur and Market–Frankford Line platforms, while on the same level, are perpendicular to each other.
