= 11th Street station (SEPTA) =

Rapid transit station in Philadelphia

11th St
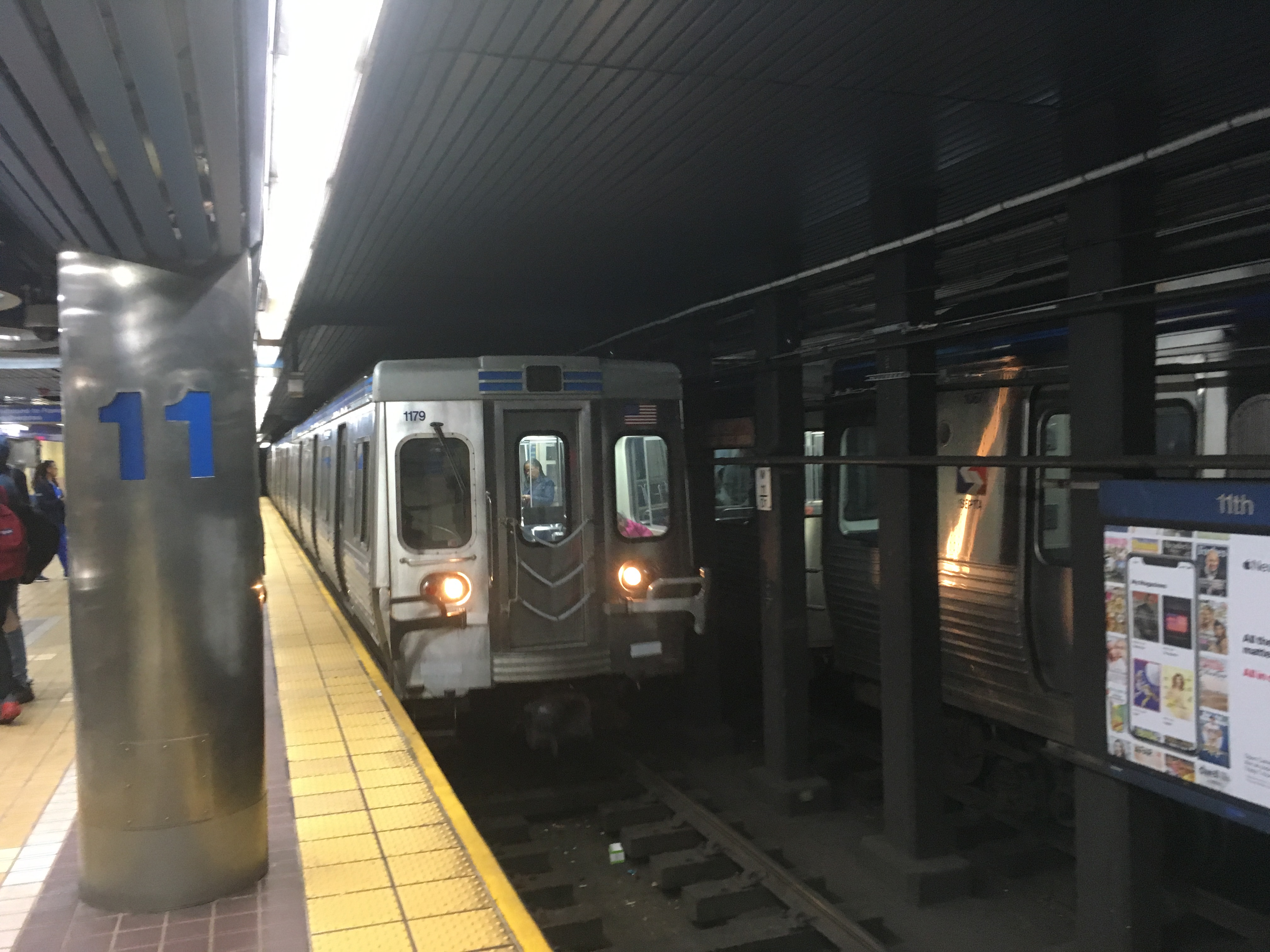
- 11th Street station

General information
- Location: 11th and Market Streets; Philadelphia, Pennsylvania, U.S.
- Coordinates: 39°57′07″N 75°09′24″W
- Owner: City of Philadelphia
- Operator: SEPTA
- Platforms: 2 side platforms
- Tracks: 2
- Connections: Regional Rail (at Jefferson); SEPTA City Bus: 17, 23, 33, 38, 44, 45, 48; NJ Transit Bus: 316, 400, 401, 402, 404, 406, 408, 409, 410, 412, 414, 417, 555

Construction
- Structure type: Underground
- Accessible: Starting in 2027

Other information
- Status: Temporarily closed

History
- Opened: August 3, 1908; 118 years ago
- Rebuilt: 2026–2028

Services
Preceding station	SEPTA Metro	Following station
13th Street toward 69th Street T.C.	L (SEPTA Metro)	8th–Market toward Frankford T.C.
Location

11th Street station is a temporarily closed subway station in Philadelphia, Pennsylvania at the intersection of 11th and Market Streets in Center City. It is served by SEPTA Metro's L and provides a connection to SEPTA Regional Rail at Jefferson Station.

The station is part of the Downtown Link concourse, a series of underground passageways outside fare control that access stations on the L, B, PATCO Speedline, and Regional Rail lines. 11th Street also has direct access to the Jefferson Tower and Fashion District Philadelphia shopping mall, and also serves the Pennsylvania Convention Center.

== History ==
The station opened August 3, 1908 as part of the first extension of the Philadelphia Rapid Transit Company's Market Street Subway. The line had originally opened a year earlier between 69th Street and 15th St/City Hall stations.

11th Street is one of three stations on the Market–Frankford Line that is not ADA-accessible, the other two being 34th Street and Front-Spring Garden stations. The addition of elevators in the station was announced in SEPTA's 2021–2032 Capital Program proposal; the station platforms would be rehabilitated and made accessible to passengers with disabilities by 2023 at an estimated cost of $9.51 million. In 2022, SEPTA revised the project's budget to $23.81 million and estimated construction would be complete by 2025. The project now also includes the renovation of the existing platforms, new signage, lighting, and security cameras, as well as waterproofing improvements. The station is to be temporarily closed from September 5, 2026 through August 30, 2027 to allow for the faster completion of these renovations, which by 2026 were planned to cost $44 million. Construction is planned to be substantially completed by June 2028.

== Station layout ==
The station has two side platforms. A mezzanine above the platforms is divided into two sections, one inside fare control and one outside of it.

== Image gallery ==
Pre-renovation

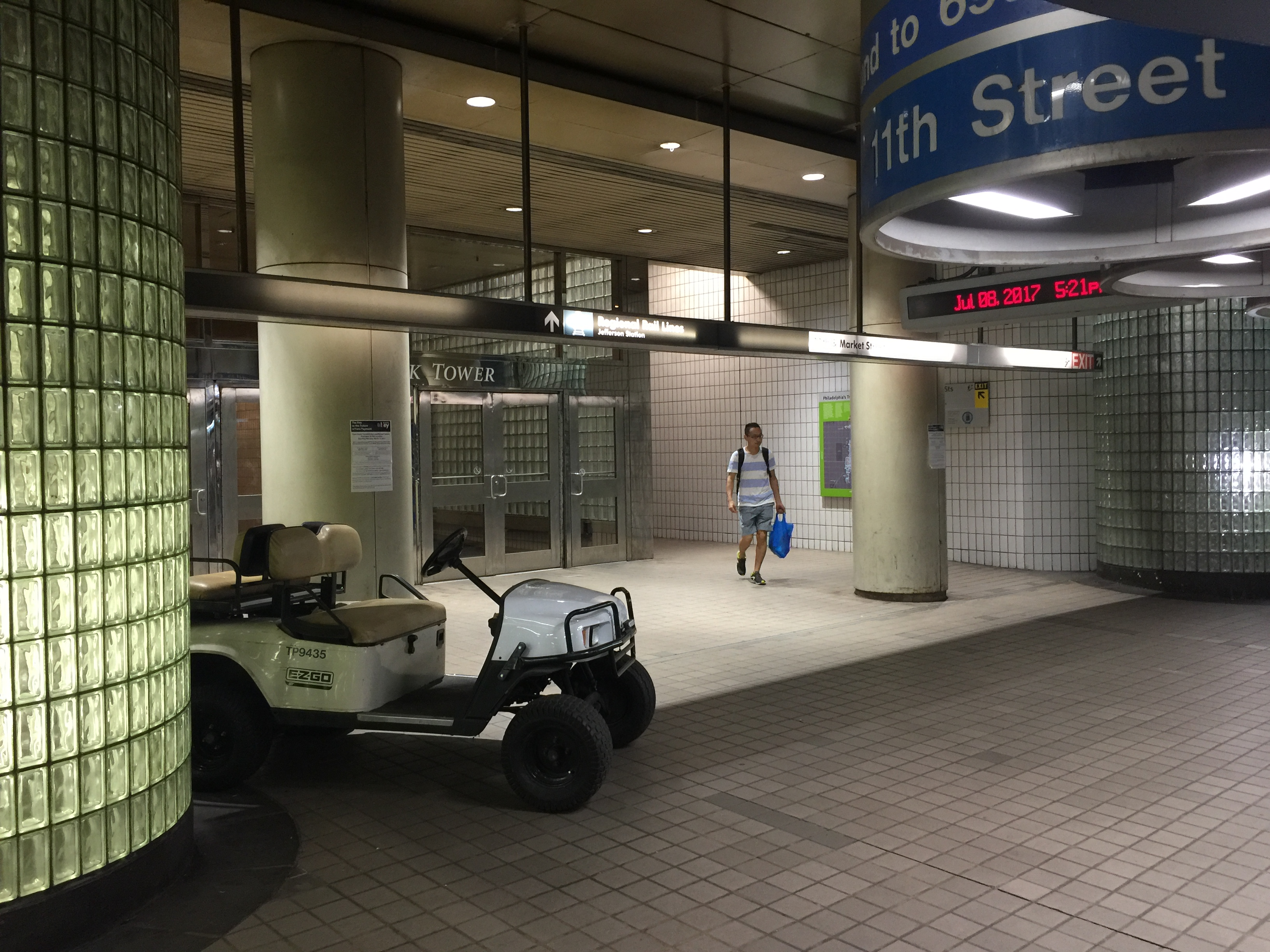
Underground station access to Jefferson Tower

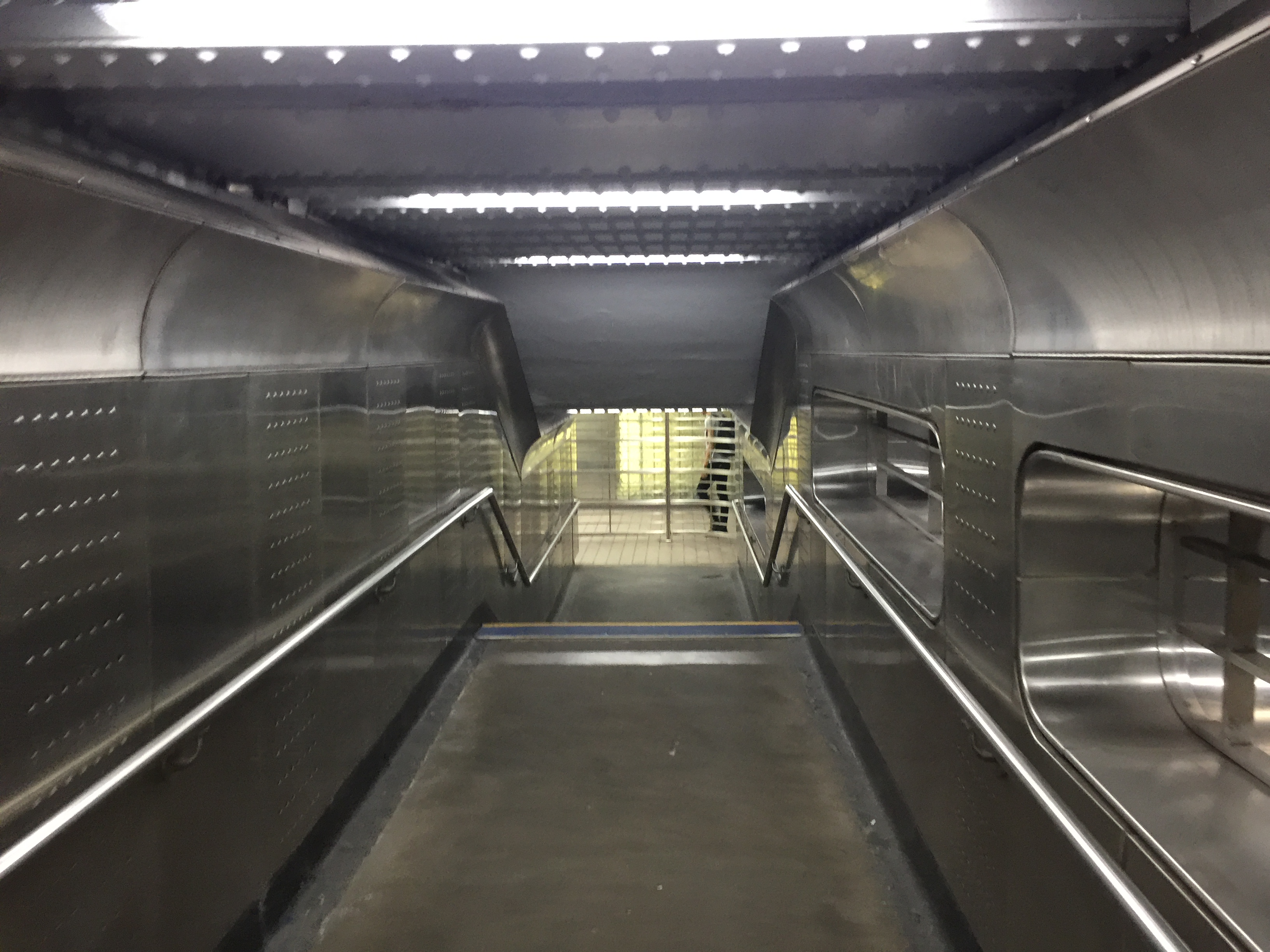
Crossover mezzanine

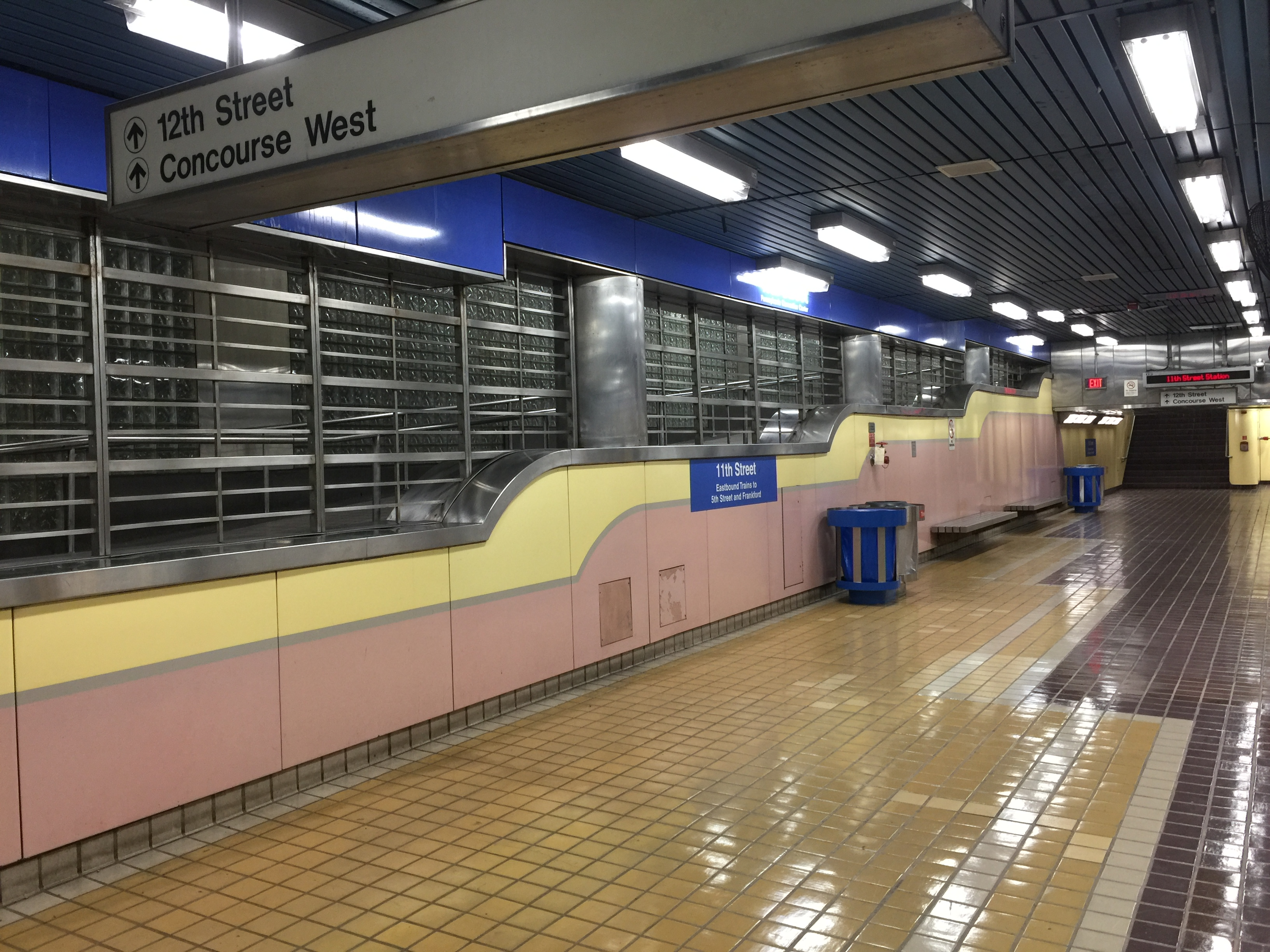
11th Street station tiles

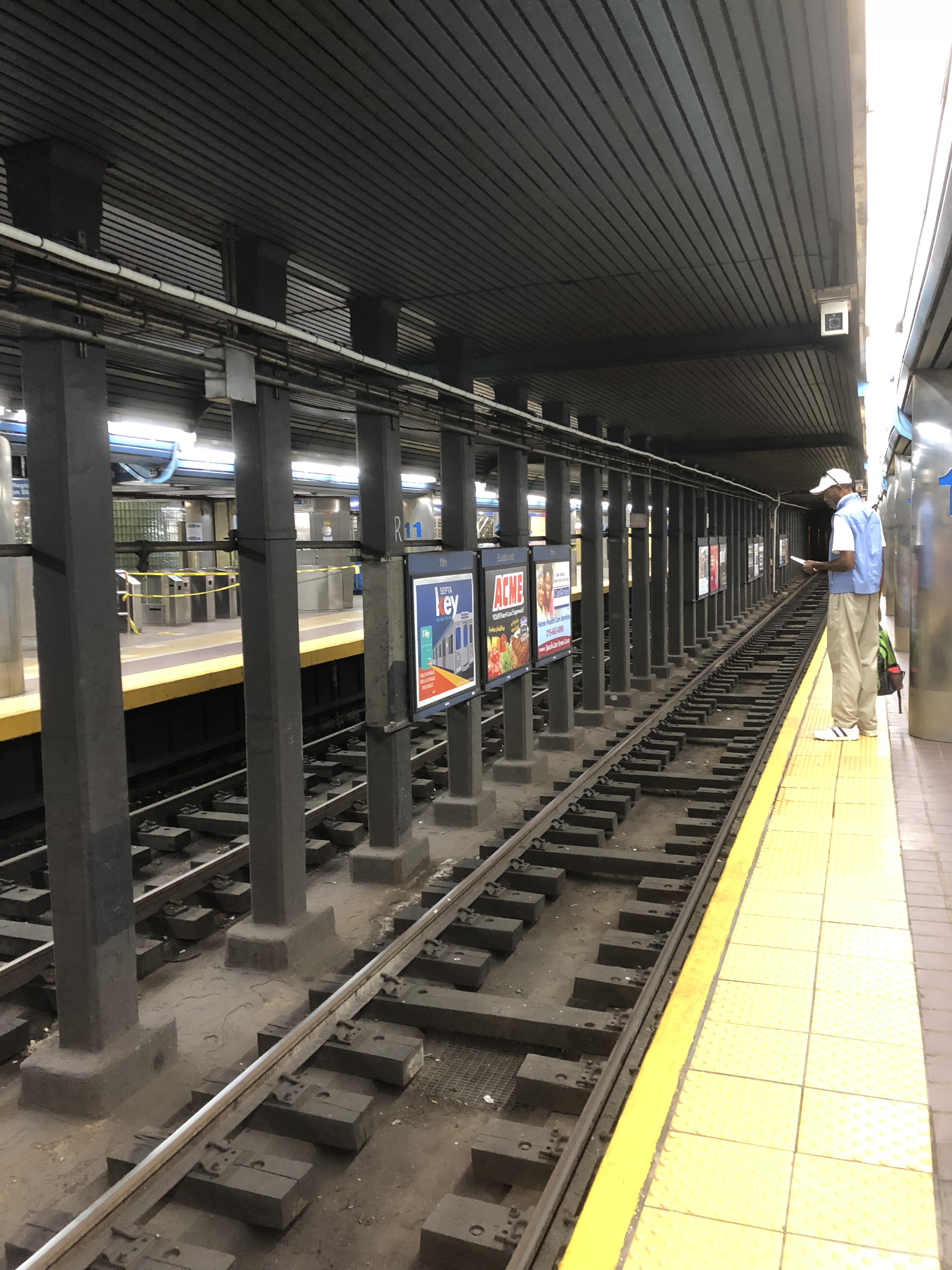
Track view

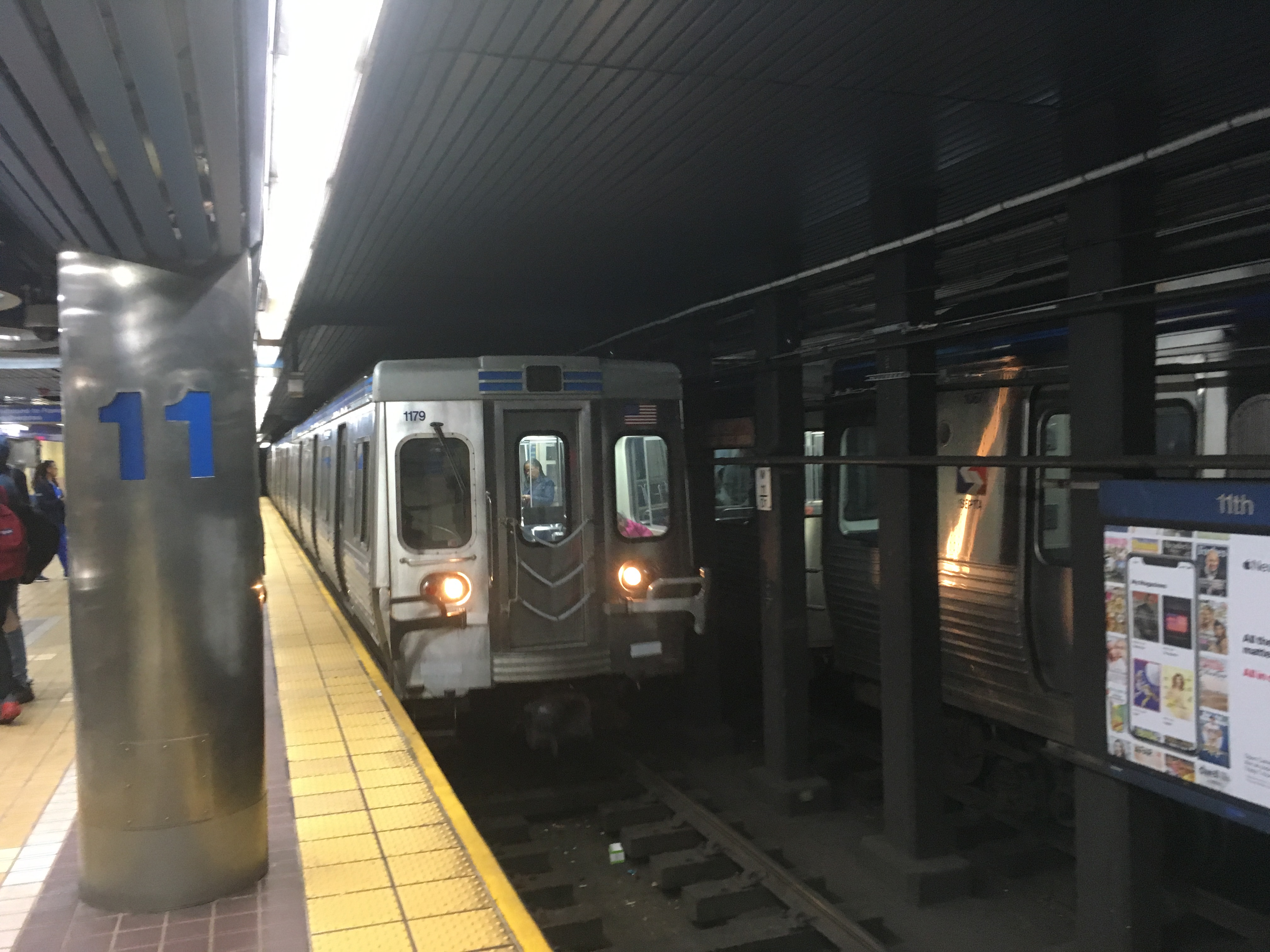
A train bound for 69th Street Transportation Center arrives at the station

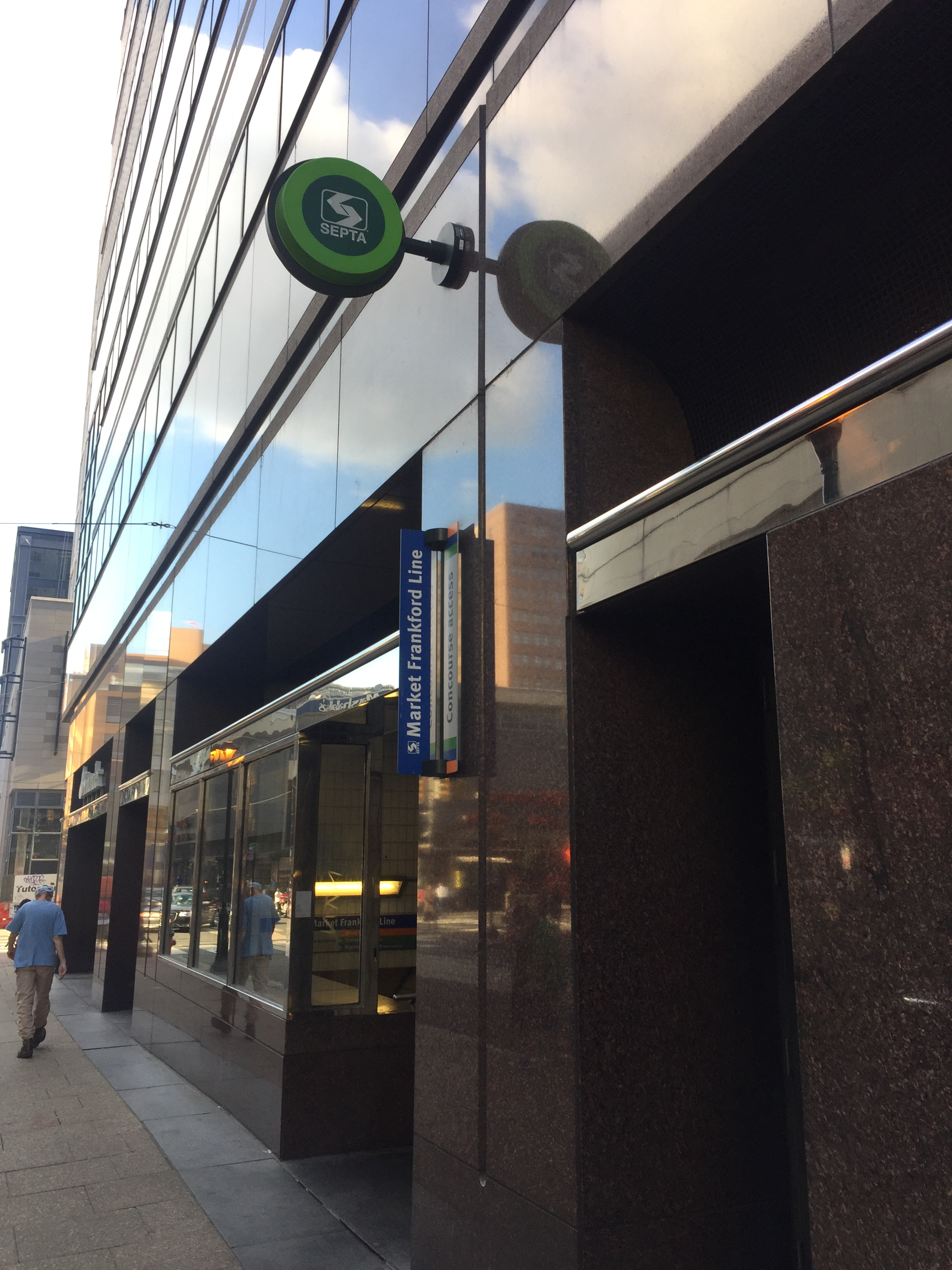
Station entrance on 11th Street

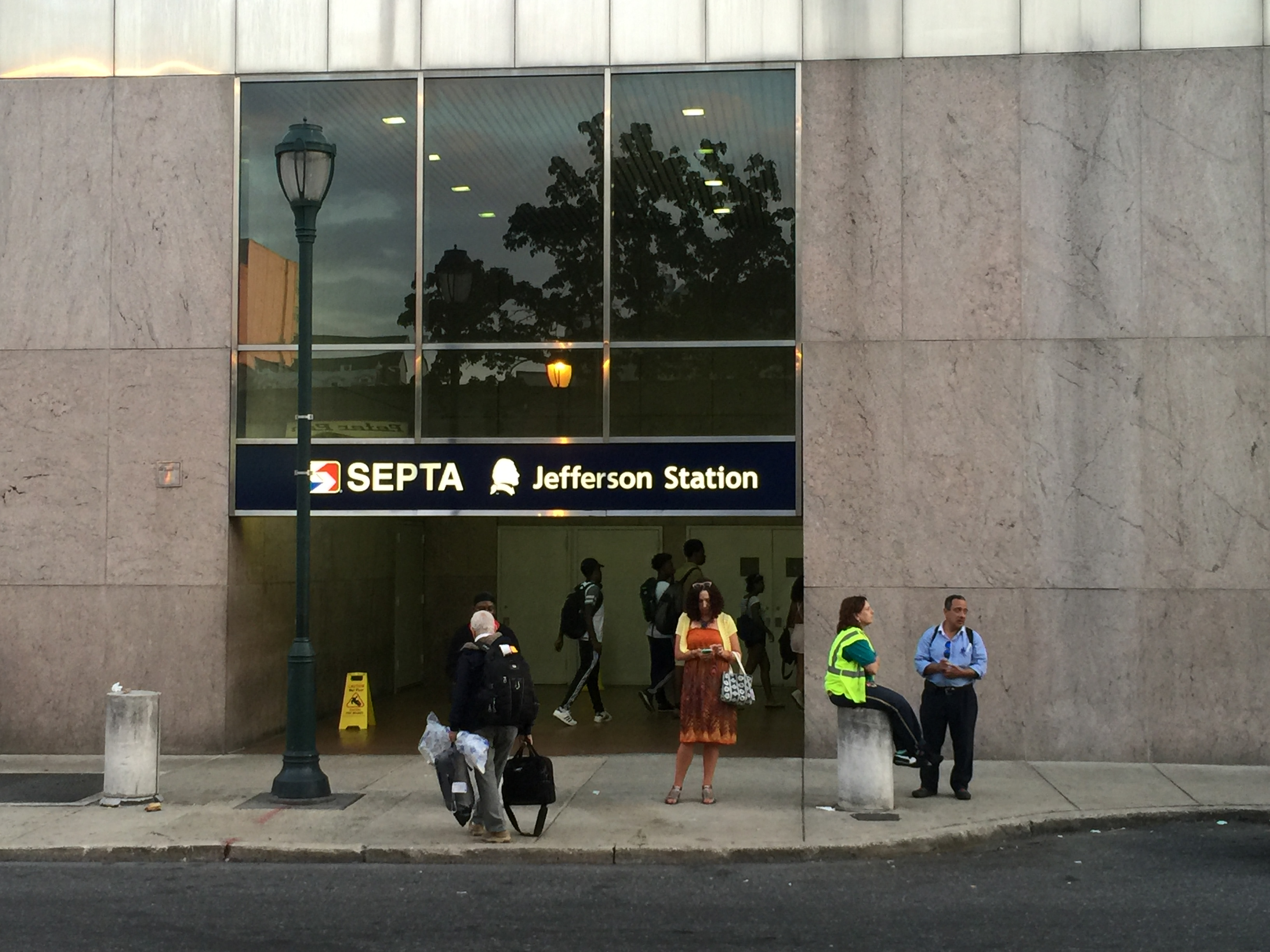
An entrance to station is shared with Jefferson Station on 11th Street

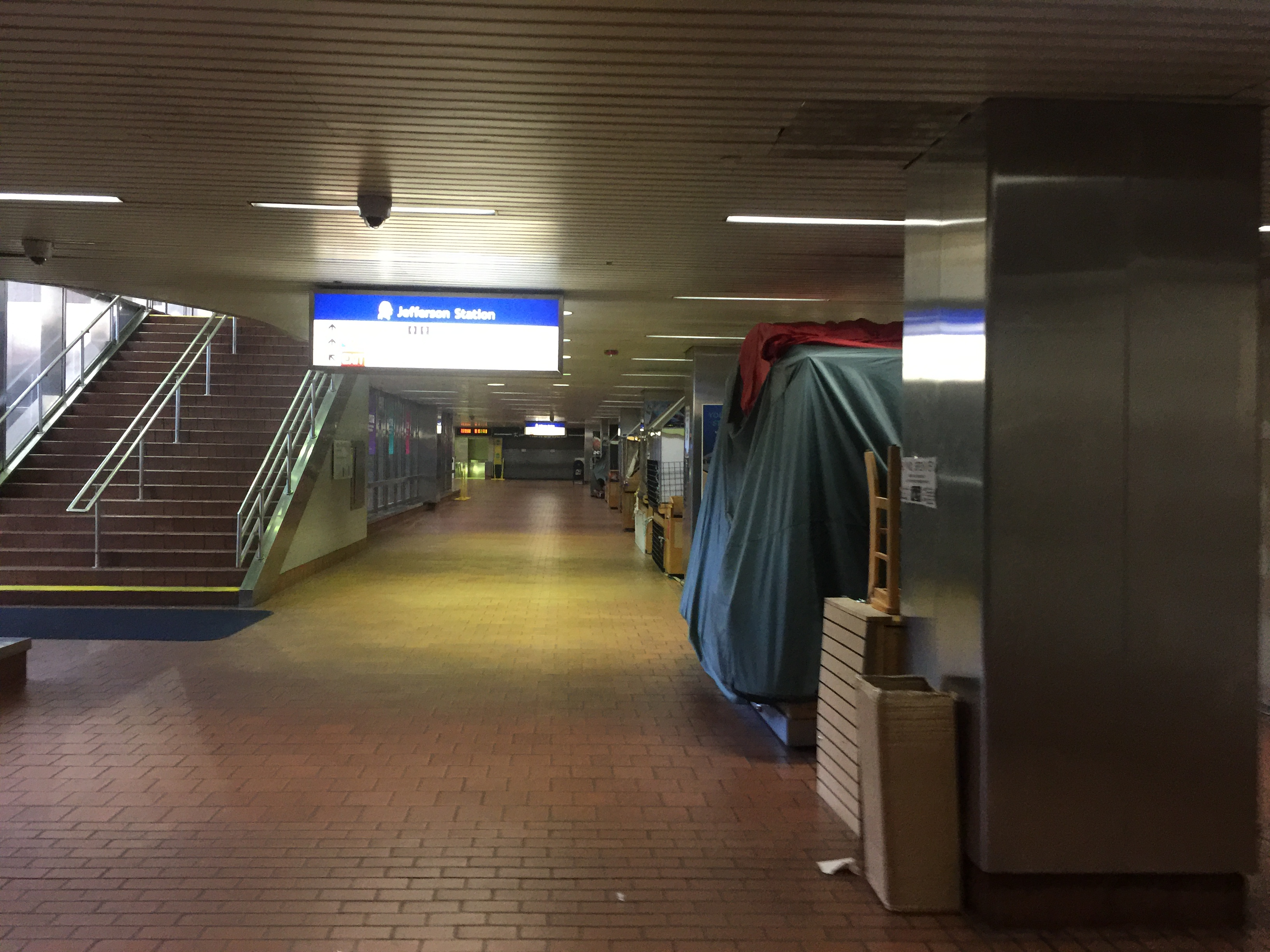
Transfer area between Jefferson Station and 11th Street station
