= Gilbert and Eleanor Kraus =

Rescuers of Jewish children from the Nazis

Gilbert and Eleanor Kraus

Gilbert and Eleanor Kraus were an American couple known for rescuing 50 Jewish children prior to the beginning of World War II.

== Personal life ==
Gilbert and Eleanor Kraus lived in the Fitler Square neighborhood of Philadelphia, Pennsylvania. Gilbert, educated at the University of Pennsylvania Law School, was an attorney, partner of a law firm, and president of Philadelphia Records. He founded the Doyleston Legal Aid Society, was president of the Bucks County Mental Health Society, and a member of Eagleville Hospital. He also bred Guernsey cows.

They sent their children to a Quaker school. Eleanor wrote about the mission that they undertook, but it was not published during her lifetime. Gilbert died in 1975 and Eleanor died in 1989.

== Background ==
After Austria was annexed to Nazi Germany through the Anschluss in 1938, conditions became difficult for Jews and they lost their rights. Many people wanted to immigrate to the United States, but immigration policy was very restrictive due to the Depression and anti-Semitism. (Note: President Franklin D. Roosevelt had asked that the American immigration quotas be expanded after the Anschluss. There were about 95,000 people who immigrated to the United States by 1939, particularly spiking after Kristallnacht in November 1938. There were about 399,000 Jews who left Austria and Germany by that time. The problem was not getting out of Nazi Germany, though, the problem was that there were not enough safe havens to accept them. There were also some Jewish community leaders who asked the Krauses not to perform the rescue mission for fear of an uprising of anti-semitism in America.) Since 1934, there were Jewish groups who tried, but failed in bringing Jewish children to the United States. They knew three Philadelphian Quaker men who went to Berlin in December 1938 on a rescue mission, but were unsuccessful.

== Rescue mission ==
Gilbert developed a relationship with Assistant Secretary of State George S. Messersmith, who had served as general counsel in Berlin (1930–1934) and then in Vienna (1934–1937), to focus his efforts in Vienna to rescue the children. Gilbert thought, though, that the best effort would be to work through Berlin first to have unused visas released for the children; these visas had been issued but had remained unused due to death, travel to other countries, or arrest. After meeting with Louis Levine, who originally proposed the idea, and Kraus, Messersmith issued a memo to the American embassy consul general Raymond H. Geist and the State Department officials in charge of visas about the plan.

Eleanor took on fundraising and finding families who would take in the children. B’rith Sholom held fundraisers for the rescue mission. They raised $150,000 and obtained 54 signed affidavits from families who said that they would support the children.

With the support of B'rith Sholom, they went to Nazi-occupied Austria and rescued children between the ages of five and fourteen in Vienna before the outbreak of World War II, which required them to work with Jewish leaders in their community who opposed the effort and American immigration policy that made the effort difficult. Gilbert set sail for Europe in early April 1939, and although Eleanor had been warned by the State Department not to travel to Europe, she traveled there after Gilbert wired her from Vienna that he needed her help. Traveling with them was a German-speaking Jewish pediatrician, Dr. Robert Schless. In Vienna, they met with individuals in the Nazi bureaucracy and at embassies.

To take a child from its mother seemed to be the lowest thing a human being could do. Yet it was as if we had drawn up in a lifeboat in a most turbulent sea. Every parent we met seemed to say: 'Here. Yes. Freely. Gladly. Take my child to a safer shore.'

— Eleanor Kraus

Hundreds of parents and children showed up to apply to have the children selected for the rescue. The children selected, 25 girls and 25 boys, were the ones considered most resilient to be separated from their families, whom they might not see again. The Krauses traveled by train from Vienna. When the children said goodbye to their families at the railroad station they were told they could not wave goodbye, as it might be considered as the Nazi salute and could result in their arrest. In Berlin, the group received 50 visas from Geist. They met with the Gestapo to obtain the passports for the children. They then traveled to Hamburg, where they set sail for New York aboard the S.S. President Harding and arrived on June 3, 1939.

The children were first brought to B'rith Sholom's summer camp in Collegeville, Pennsylvania, which had a 25-bedroom house. They then went to live with relatives who lived in the United States or foster families. The Krauses wanted to make another mission, but after the war began they were unable to make another rescue. Related documents and photographs were donated to the United States Holocaust Memorial Museum.

== 50 Children: The Rescue Mission of Mr and Mrs Kraus - the Movie ==
Their story was made into the documentary 50 Children: The Rescue Mission of Mr. and Mrs. Kraus - the movie (2013) by Steven Pressman, the husband of their granddaughter Liz Perle. It premiered on Yom HaShoah, Holocaust Remembrance Day. According to Pressman, they were "the single largest group of [Jewish] children" that were brought to the United States during the Holocaust in one group.

== Kraus Family Foundation ==
In honor of Gilbert and Eleanor Kraus, the Kraus Family Foundation and the Union for Reform Judaism (URJ) announced on April 30, 2019, on the eve of Yom Hashoah (Holocaust Remembrance Day), the formation of the Gilbert and Eleanor Kraus Initiative for Immigrant and Refugee Justice. The foundation’s cofounders, Peter (the grandson of Gilbert and Eleanor), and his wife, Jill Kraus, funded the program with a multi-year gift to the URJ of more than one million dollars to galvanize people to action around the immigration and refugee crisis in the United States.

“What Jill and I are trying to say with regard to this gift,” Peter Kraus stated in an interview, “is the power of everyday individuals. The more we everyday individuals commit to being part of the immigration process, the more successful our country will be in finding an answer to the trauma that is being visited upon refugees.”

== See also ==
- Kindertransport
