= Fitler Square =

Neighborhood in Philadelphia, US

- Neighborhood of Philadelphia
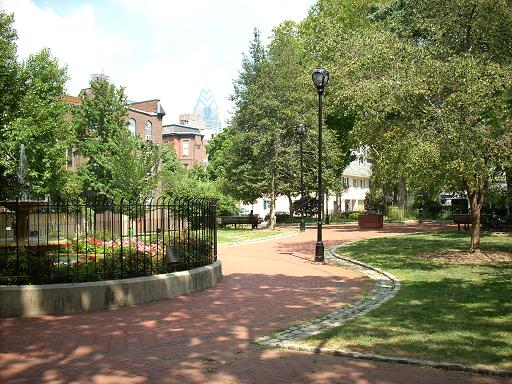
- Fitler Square in Summer 2007

- Location within Philadelphia
- Country: United States
- State: Pennsylvania
- County: Philadelphia
- City: Philadelphia
- Area codes: 215, 267, and 445

Fitler Square is a 0.5 acre (0.20 ha) public park in Philadelphia, Pennsylvania, United States and a surrounding neighborhood of the same name. The square is bounded on the east by 23rd Street, on the west by 24th Street, on the north by Panama Street, and on the south by Pine Street. The neighborhood encompasses much of southwest Center City west of Rittenhouse Square and east of the Schuylkill River.

Fitler Square was named for late 19th century Philadelphia mayor Edwin Henry Fitler shortly after his death in 1896. The square lies on land owned by the City of Philadelphia, via the Department of Parks and Recreation, and is cared for through a public private partnership between the Department of Parks and Recreation and the Fitler Square Improvement Association.

== Neighborhood ==
Fitler Square, c. 1947

The name Fitler Square is also used to describe the neighborhood surrounding the square, bounded roughly by 21st Street on the east, the Schuylkill River on the west, Locust Street on the north, and South Street on the south. To the east of this neighborhood is the Rittenhouse Square neighborhood; to the west is the University City neighborhood, home to the University of Pennsylvania and Drexel University; to the south is Southwest Center City, also known as "South of South" or the "Graduate Hospital Area". The portion of Center City surrounding Fitler Square and nearby Rittenhouse Square is sometimes referred to as "Rit-Fit" after the two parks.

Before the 1950s, the neighborhood was a prime example of the urban blight that had overcome much of the city. The park itself was described as a "mudhole inhabited by drunks and empty bottles".

In the mid-1950s, the Center City Residents' Association successfully petitioned Mayor Clark to do something about the decline of the neighborhood. Working together, they freed up mortgage money for the construction of new homes and rehabilitation of the neighborhood. Also threatening the neighborhood was the proposed Crosstown Expressway. The threat of its construction, which would demolish much of the neighborhood, was enough to reduce property values and add to the neighborhood's blight. The Residents' Association was successful in changing these plans and in the following years the neighborhood drastically improved largely due to efforts of the Center City Residents' Association and the Fitler Square Improvement Association.

The neighborhood is mostly residential, composed of single-family homes, and within a short walk of the commercial areas of Center City.

== Sculptures ==
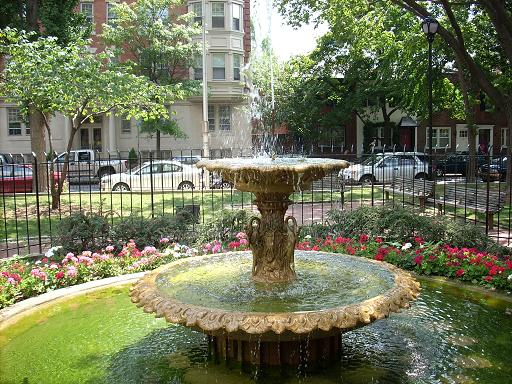
The fountain in Fitler Square

A sculpture of three turtles adorn the park made by Philadelphia artist Eric Berg along with sculptures of a Grizzly Bear and a Ram. The center of the park is dominated by a Victorian-era fountain which flows most of the year. Prior to 2010, this fountain, like many in Philadelphia, flowed fresh water from the main directly into the sewer system. In 2010, the Fitler Square Improvement Association engaged a large project at a cost of approximately $40,000 funded by neighborhood donations and a $7,000 grant from the Pennsylvania Horticultural Society to change the fountain into one that recirculates all of its water with a pumping system saving huge amounts of water each year.

== Educational institutions ==
The Philadelphia School, a private institution, is located in the Fitler Square Neighborhood at 2501 Lombard St. The school, which originally opened in 1972, offers preschool through 8th grade classes.

The Free Library of Philadelphia operates the Philadelphia City Institute on the first floor and lower level of an apartment complex at 1905 Locust Street.

== Notable people ==
- Gilbert and Eleanor Kraus, subjects of 50 Children: The Rescue Mission of Mr. and Mrs. Kraus

== In popular culture ==
- On the television show Philly, Kim Delaney's character "Kathleen" was portrayed as living in a small apartment overlooking the park.
- Hojun Li, co-editor of the film The Sixth Sense, claims to have been inspired by children in Fitler Square.
