= Steven Pressman =

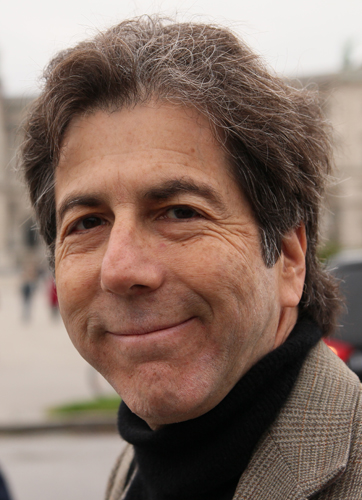
- Steven Pressman (2010)
- Born: 1955 (age 70–71); Los Angeles, California
- Education: University of California at Berkeley
- Occupations: Journalist, filmmaker
- Spouse: Liz Perle

Steven Pressman (born 1955) is an American documentary filmmaker, journalist, author of two books (Outrageous Betrayal and 50 Children), and director/producer of the documentary film 50 Children: The Rescue Mission of Mr. and Mrs. Kraus and three subsequent documentary films.

== Personal life ==
Pressman was born in Los Angeles in 1955 and obtained an undergraduate degree in political science from the University of California at Berkeley. He has two adult children and lived in San Francisco with his wife, writer and former book publishing executive Liz Perle, who died in August 2015.

== Career ==
=== Writing ===
Throughout his career, Pressman has written for several publications including the San Francisco Daily Journal, California Lawyer, Daily Journal of Los Angeles, California, and the Columbia Journalism Review. He contributed an article on libel law in 1994, for the United States Department of State. In 1993, Pressman's Outrageous Betrayal was published by St. Martin's Press and HarperCollins published his 50 Children in 2014.

Books

- Outrageous Betrayal: The Dark Journey of Werner Erhard from Est to Exile
- 50 Children: One Ordinary American Couple's Extraordinary Rescue Mission into the Heart of Nazi Germany

=== Filmmaking ===
Pressman began his filmmaking career by producing short videos for the American Conservatory Theater in San Francisco, California. In 2013, he directed and produced the documentary film 50 Children: The Rescue Mission of Mr. and Mrs. Kraus, which premiered on HBO and tells the story of Gilbert and Eleanor Kraus, a Jewish couple from Philadelphia who traveled to Nazi Germany in 1939 and, with the help of the B'rith Sholom fraternal organization, saved Jewish children in Vienna from likely death in the Holocaust by finding them new homes in Philadelphia. The heroic Krauses were the grandparents of Pressman's wife, and the film is, in part, based on the manuscript of a memoir left behind by Eleanor Kraus when she died in 1989. 50 Children was nominated for a News & Documentary Emmy award in the category of Outstanding Historical Programming in 2014.

In 2020, Pressman directed and produced the documentary film Holy Silence, which tells the story of the Vatican's actions, and inactions, during the Holocaust and in the years leading up to it. The film was shown at several film festivals and had its television premiere on PBS in November 2020. The film features actor David Strathairn, who is heard as the voice of President Franklin D. Roosevelt, and actor Marco Barricelli, who is heard as the voice of Pope Pius XII.

In 2022, Pressman directed and produced the documentary film The Levys of Monticello, which tells the story of a Jewish family that owned and preserved Thomas Jefferson's home for nearly 90 years in the decades that followed Jefferson's death in 1826. The film premiered at the Atlanta Jewish Film Festival in February 2022, where it received the Building Bridges Jury Prize award. The film also received the Audience Award for Best Documentary at the Washington DC Jewish Film Festival in May 2022.

In 2024, Pressman directed and produced the documentary film Moses Ezekiel: Portrait of a Lost Artist, which tells the story of a Jewish-American sculptor who, among other works of art, created several statues that memorialize the Confederacy and the so-called "Lost Cause" of the American South.
