= 50 Children: The Rescue Mission of Mr. and Mrs. Kraus =

- Theatrical Poster (San Francisco Jewish Film Festival)
- Written by: Steven Pressman
- Directed by: Steven Pressman
- Starring: Mamie Gummer
- Narrated by: Alan Alda
- Music by: Marco D'Ambrosio
- Country of origin: United States

Production
- Producer: Steven Pressman
- Cinematography: Andrew Black; David Sperling
- Editor: Ken Schneider
- Running time: 62 minutes

Original release
- Network: HBO
- Release: April 8, 2013

50 Children: The Rescue Mission of Mr. and Mrs. Kraus, originally known as To Save a Life, is a 2013 documentary film written, produced, and directed by Steven Pressman. It was first shown on HBO in April 2013.

The film tells the story of Gilbert and Eleanor Kraus, a Jewish couple from Philadelphia who traveled to Nazi Germany in 1939 and, with the help of the B'rith Sholom fraternal organization, saved Jewish children in Vienna from likely death in the Holocaust by finding them new homes in Philadelphia. The Krauses were the grandparents of Pressman's wife, Liz Perle, and the film is based on the manuscript of a memoir left behind by Eleanor Kraus when she died in 1989.

The documentary, which premiered on HBO in 2013 on Yom HaShoah, Holocaust Remembrance Day, was narrated by Mamie Gummer and Alan Alda. Some of those who were rescued were interviewed for the film. Aged from five to fourteen, they were senior citizens living in the United States and Israel when the film was made.
