= Liz Perle =

Liz Perle (April 13, 1956 – August 20, 2015) was an American publishing executive, writer, and co-founder and editor-in-chief of the nonprofit Common Sense Media.

== Early life and education ==
Elizabeth Ann Perle was born in Manhattan, New York on April 13, 1956. Her parents were E. Gabriel Perle and Ellen Kraus Perle. They lived in Rowayton, Connecticut until her mother died of breast cancer when Liz was eight years old. She and her father then moved to Manhattan and went to school in the Bronx at Riverdale Country School. She graduated with a bachelor's degree from Yale University in 1977, after transferring from Hampshire College.

== Career ==
Elizabeth was a publishing executive in New York at Addison-Wesley, Bantam Books, and Times Books. At Bantam, she created the marketing plan for A Brief History of Time by Stephen Hawking. In 1988, she was publisher and vice president of Prentice Hall Press. After returning to the United States from Singapore, she worked at HarperSanFrancisco as editor at large and wrote the book When Work Doesn't Work Anymore: Women, Work and Identity (1997).

In 2002, she and Jim Steyer cofounded and she later became editor-in-chief of Common Sense Media to help parents and their children use digital media responsibly.

The documentary of her grandparents Gilbert and Eleanor Kraus entitled 50 Children: The Rescue Mission of Mr. and Mrs. Kraus was released in 2013 by HBO. She appeared in the film that told of how in 1939 her grandparents facilitated the escape of 50 children who were Jewish from Nazi Germany. Her husband, Steven Pressman, directed the film.

== Personal life ==
She was married first to Steven McKenna, with whom she lived in Singapore in the 1990s and had a son, David Perle McKenna. They divorced and in 1998, Perle moved to San Francisco. Due to her experiences, she wrote the book Money, a Memoir: Women, Emotions, and Cash, which was published in 2006.

In 2001, she married Steven Pressman and has a stepdaughter, Roshann Pressman. Perle died at the age of 59 at her San Francisco home on August 20, 2015 of breast cancer, which she had for eight years.
