= Center City, Philadelphia =

Area of Philadelphia, Pennsylvania, United States

Center City
- Neighborhood and central business district
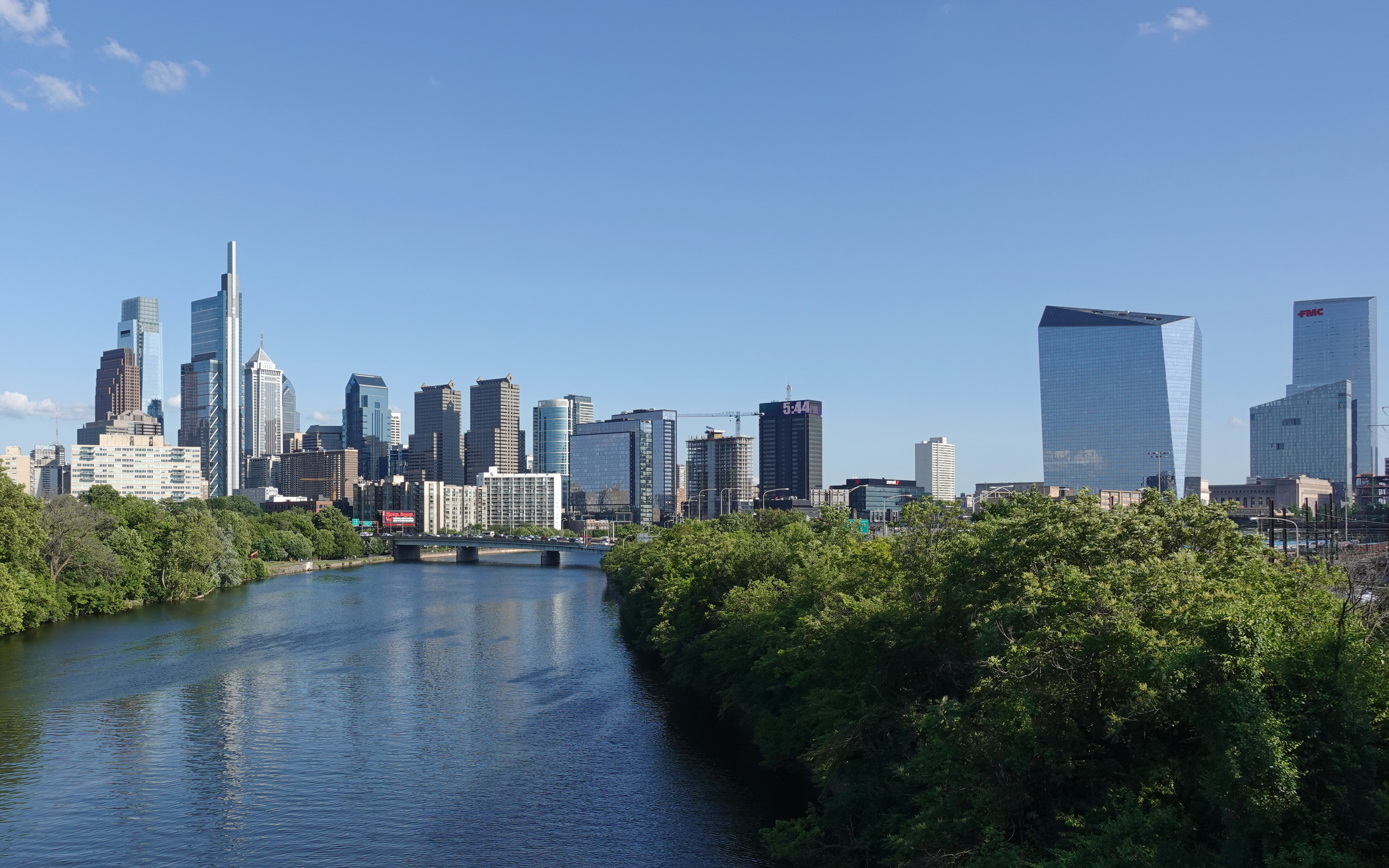
- The Schuylkill River (foreground) and Center City Philadelphia (background) in 2024

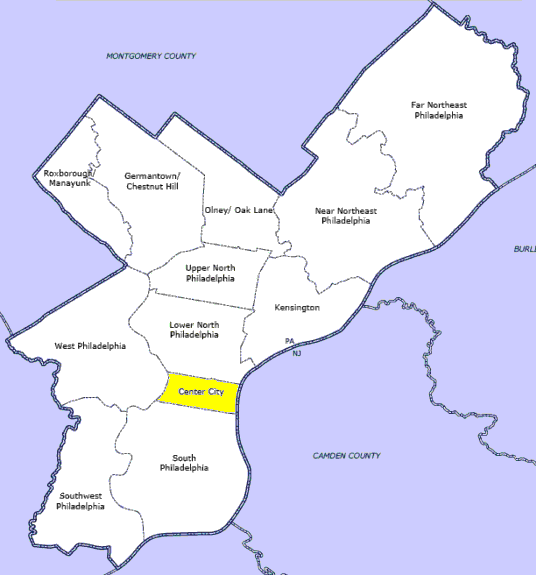
- Center City within Philadelphia
- Coordinates: 39.952°N 75.164°W
- Country: United States
- State: Pennsylvania
- City: Philadelphia

Area
  - Total: 2.16 sq mi (5.6 km^{2})

Population (2020)
  - Total: 69,433
  - Density: 32,151/sq mi (12,414/km^{2})

Demographics
  - White: 66.8%
  - Black: 9.3%
  - Native: 0.1%
  - Asian: 14.0%
  - Pacific Islander: 0.1%
  - Multiracial: 7.6%
  - Other: 2.0%
- ZIP Codes: 19102, 19103, 19106–19107, 19109, 19146–19147

Center City includes the central business district and central neighborhoods of Philadelphia, Pennsylvania, United States. It comprises the area that made up the City of Philadelphia prior to the Act of Consolidation, 1854, which extended the city borders to be coterminous with Philadelphia County.

== Geography ==
=== Boundaries ===
Schuylkill Expressway near Center City

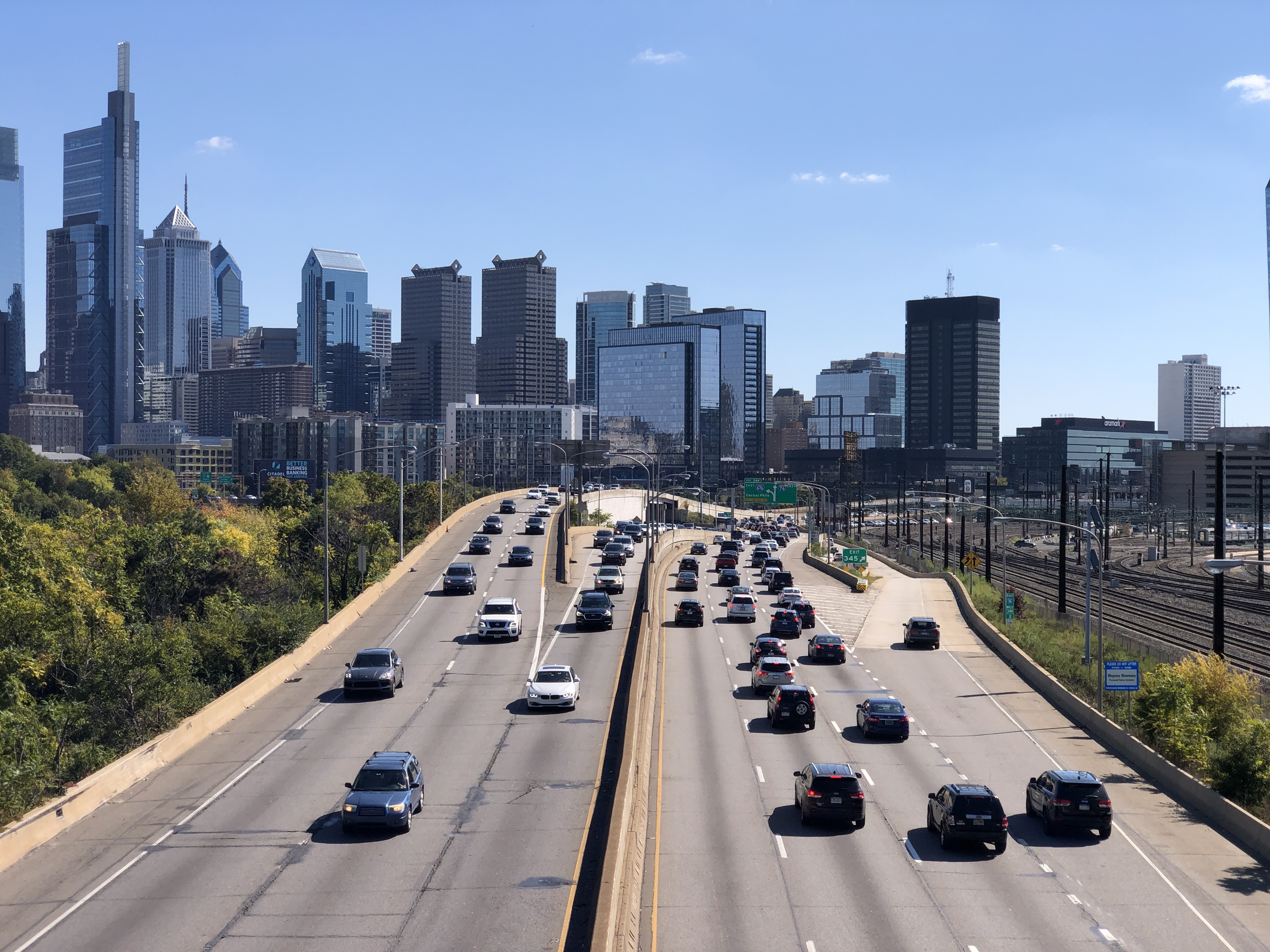
Eastbound

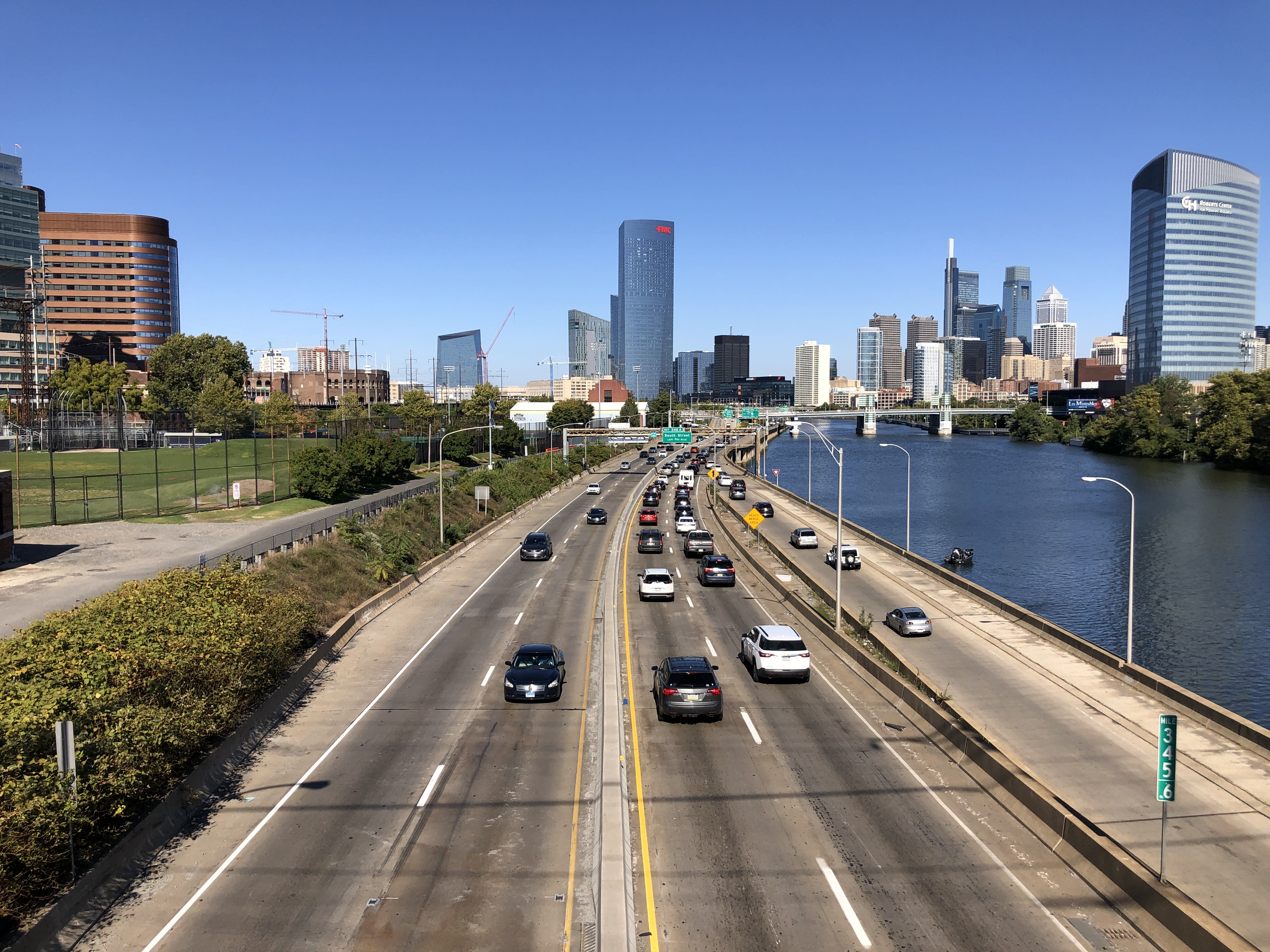
Westbound

Views of the Schuylkill Expressway near Center City in 2022

Center City is bounded by South Street to the south, the Delaware River to the east, the Schuylkill River to the west, and Vine Street to the north. The district occupies the old boundaries of the City of Philadelphia before the city was made coterminous with Philadelphia County in 1854. The Center City District, which has special powers of taxation, has a complicated, irregularly shaped boundary that includes much but not all of this area and also extends beyond it. The Philadelphia Police Department patrols four districts located within Center City – the 6th, 9th, 3rd, and 17th districts.

=== Neighborhood features ===
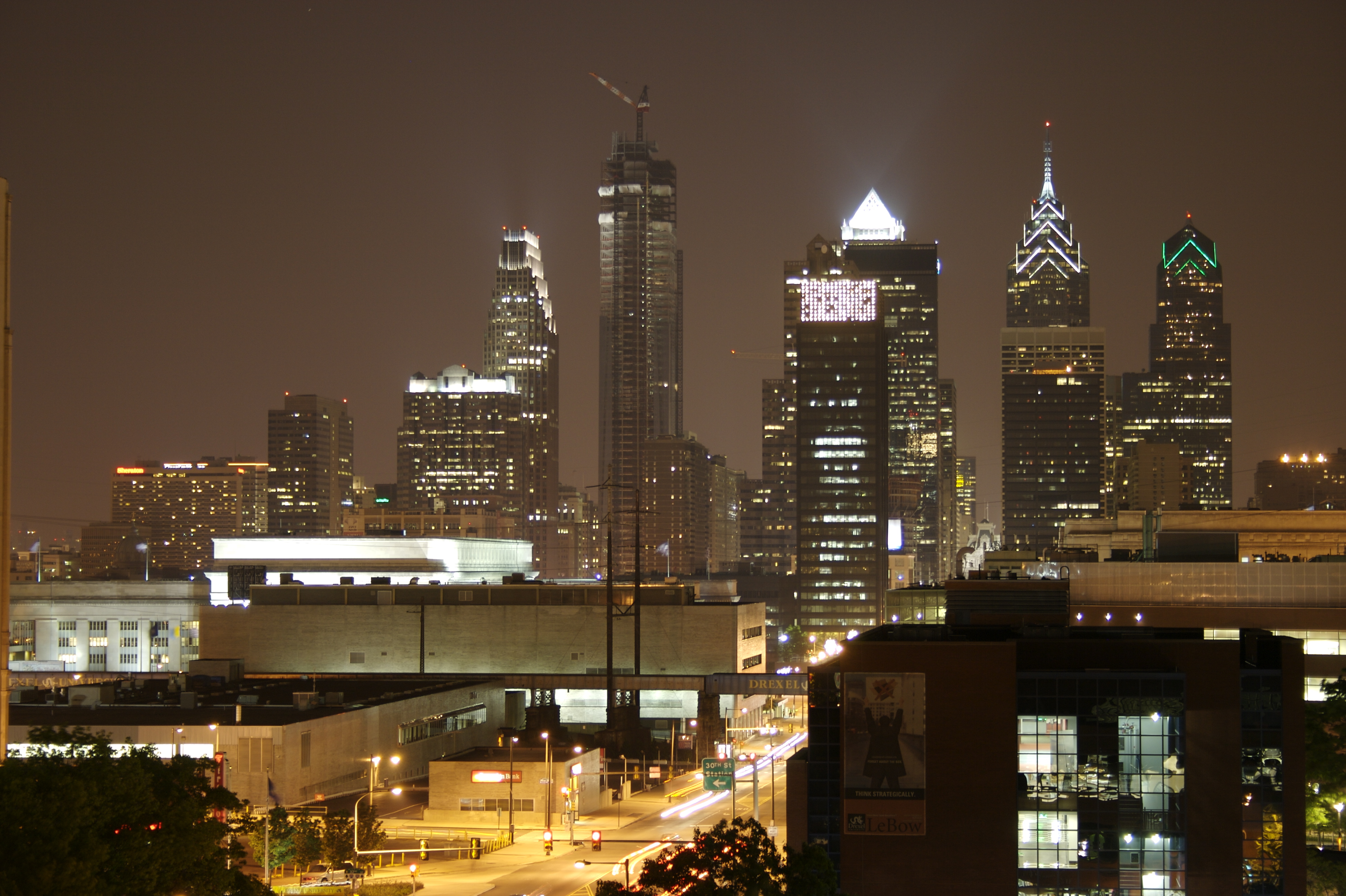
Center City at night in May 2007

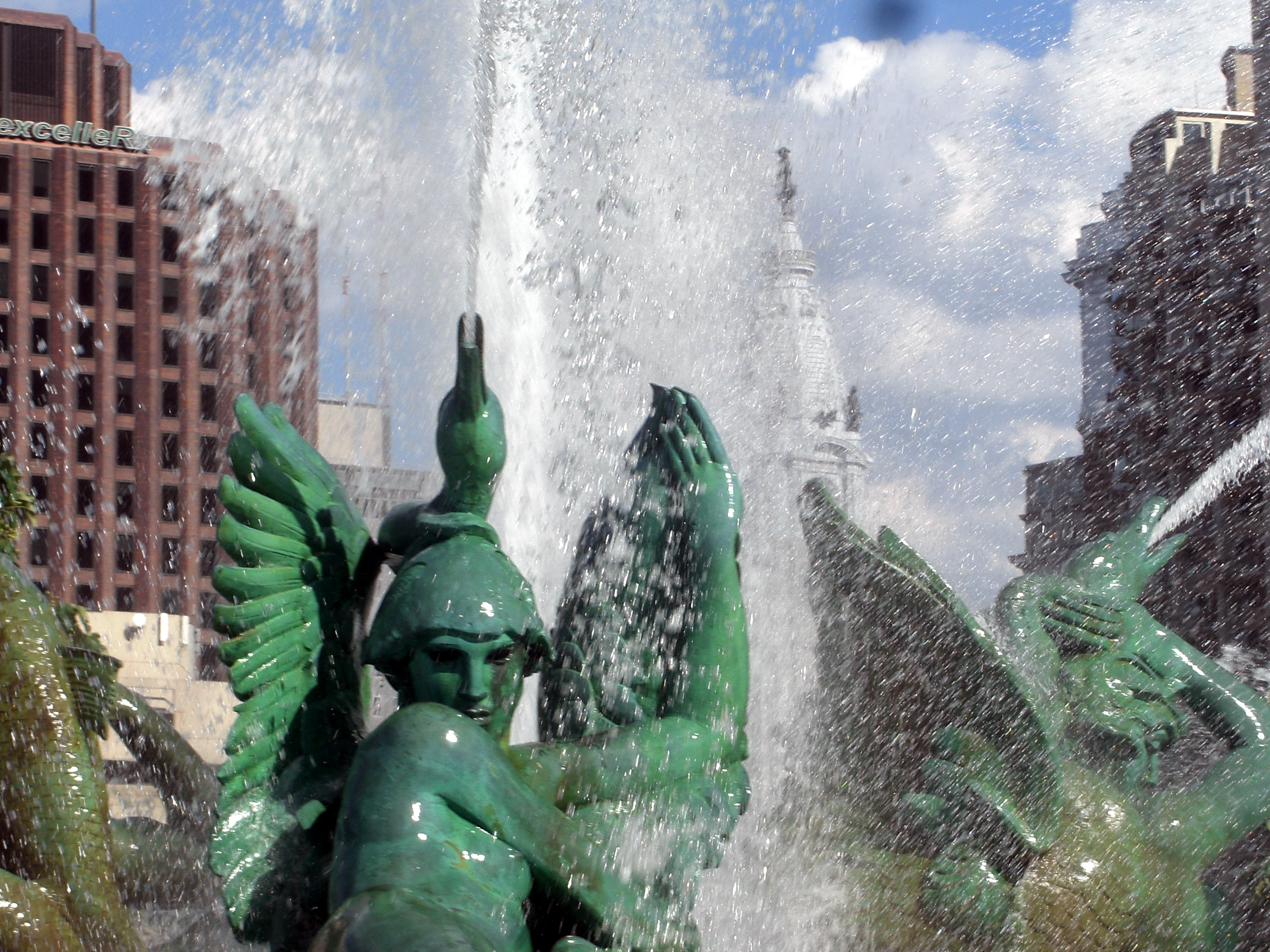
Logan Circle in 2011

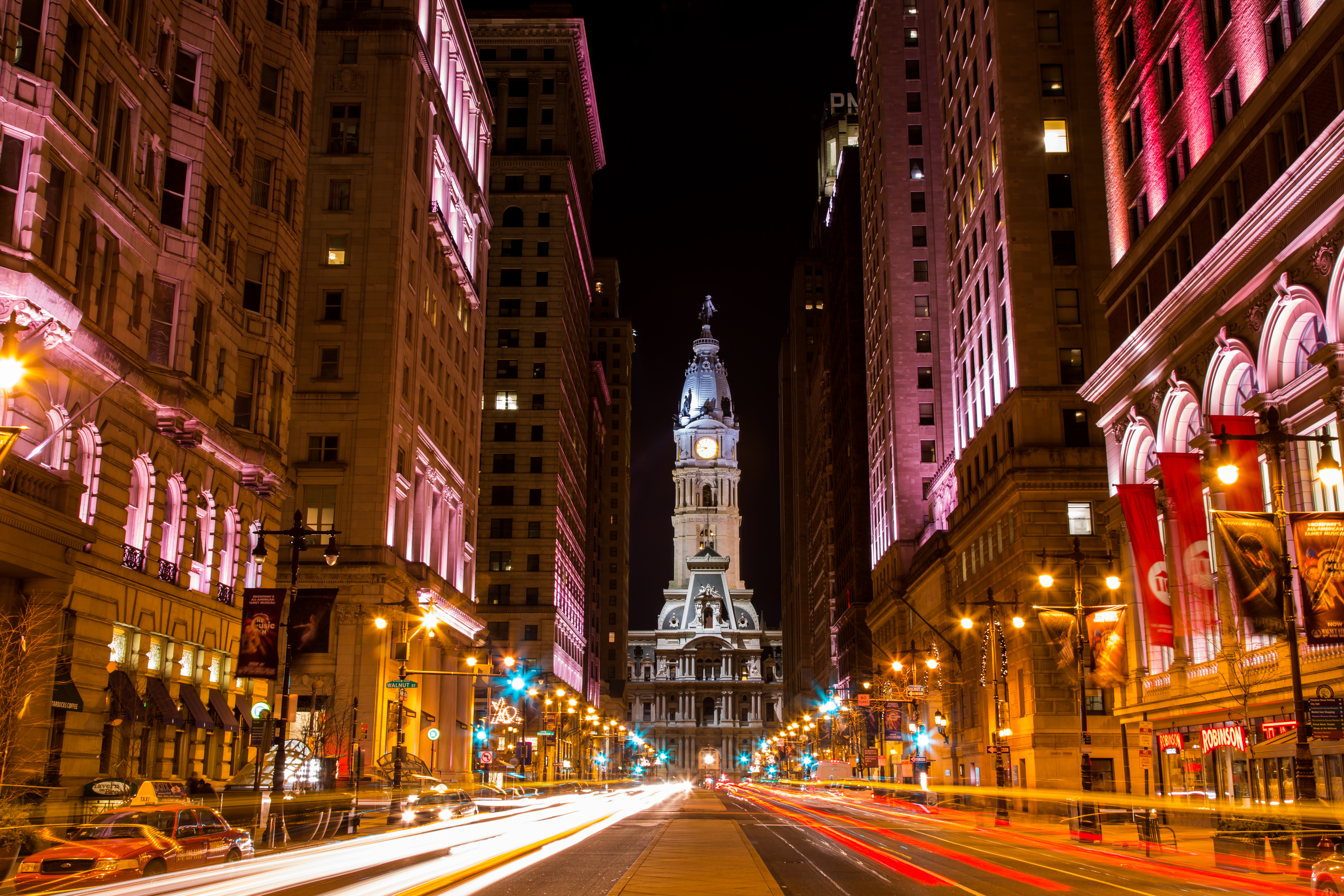
Philadelphia City Hall at night in December 2012

Among Center City's neighborhoods and districts are Penn's Landing, Old City, Society Hill, South Street, Washington Square West, Market East, Chinatown, Logan Square, the Museum District (located along the Benjamin Franklin Parkway), Rittenhouse Square, Fitler Square, the Avenue of the Arts (South Broad Street), and Jewelers' Row.

Center City is home to most of Philadelphia's tallest buildings, including Philadelphia's City Hall, the second-tallest masonry building in the world and, until 1987, the tallest in Philadelphia, as well as the tallest building in the world for fourteen years (1894–1908). In March 1987, One Liberty Place broke the gentlemen's agreement not to exceed the height of the statue of William Penn atop City Hall. Upon the completion of One Liberty Place, no Philadelphia major-league sports team won a world championship for the next two decades, a phenomenon known as the "Curse of Billy Penn". In an effort to reverse the curse, a three-foot statue of Penn was affixed to the top of the Comcast Center upon its completion as the city's new tallest building in 2007. On October 29, 2008, the Philadelphia Phillies won the 2008 World Series, ending the "curse".

Seven other skyscrapers now exceed the height of Penn's statue, including One Liberty Place's little sister, Two Liberty Place. The Comcast Center, which was completed in 2007, became the tallest building in Pennsylvania, 30 feet taller than One Liberty Place. In 2018, the Comcast Technology Center opened, which is now the tallest building in Philadelphia and the tallest building in the United States outside of Manhattan and Chicago. 1441 Chestnut, which is currently under construction, is also slated to be taller than City Hall. The first publicly accessible vantage point higher than City Hall opened at One Liberty Observation Deck on the 57th floor of One Liberty Place in 2015.

Other Center City skyscrapers include the BNY Mellon Center and the Three Logan Square, which houses a traffic camera used by the Philadelphia branch of the Westwood One MetroNetworks traffic service.

Across the street from City Hall is the Masonic Temple, the headquarters of the Grand Lodge of Pennsylvania, a legacy of the Founding Fathers and signers of the Declaration of Independence, many of whom were Freemasons; these include George Washington and Benjamin Franklin. While Philadelphia's population declined between 1990 and 2000, Center City's population increased by 10% over that same period.

In 2007, the city designated the area bound by 11th Street, Broad Street, Chestnut Street and Pine Street as the Gayborhood.

=== Neighborhoods ===
- Callowhill
- Chinatown
- Fitler Square
- Gayborhood
- French Quarter
- Logan Square
- Market East
- Old City
- Penn Center
- Penn's Landing
- Rittenhouse Square
- Society Hill
- Washington Square West

== Economy ==
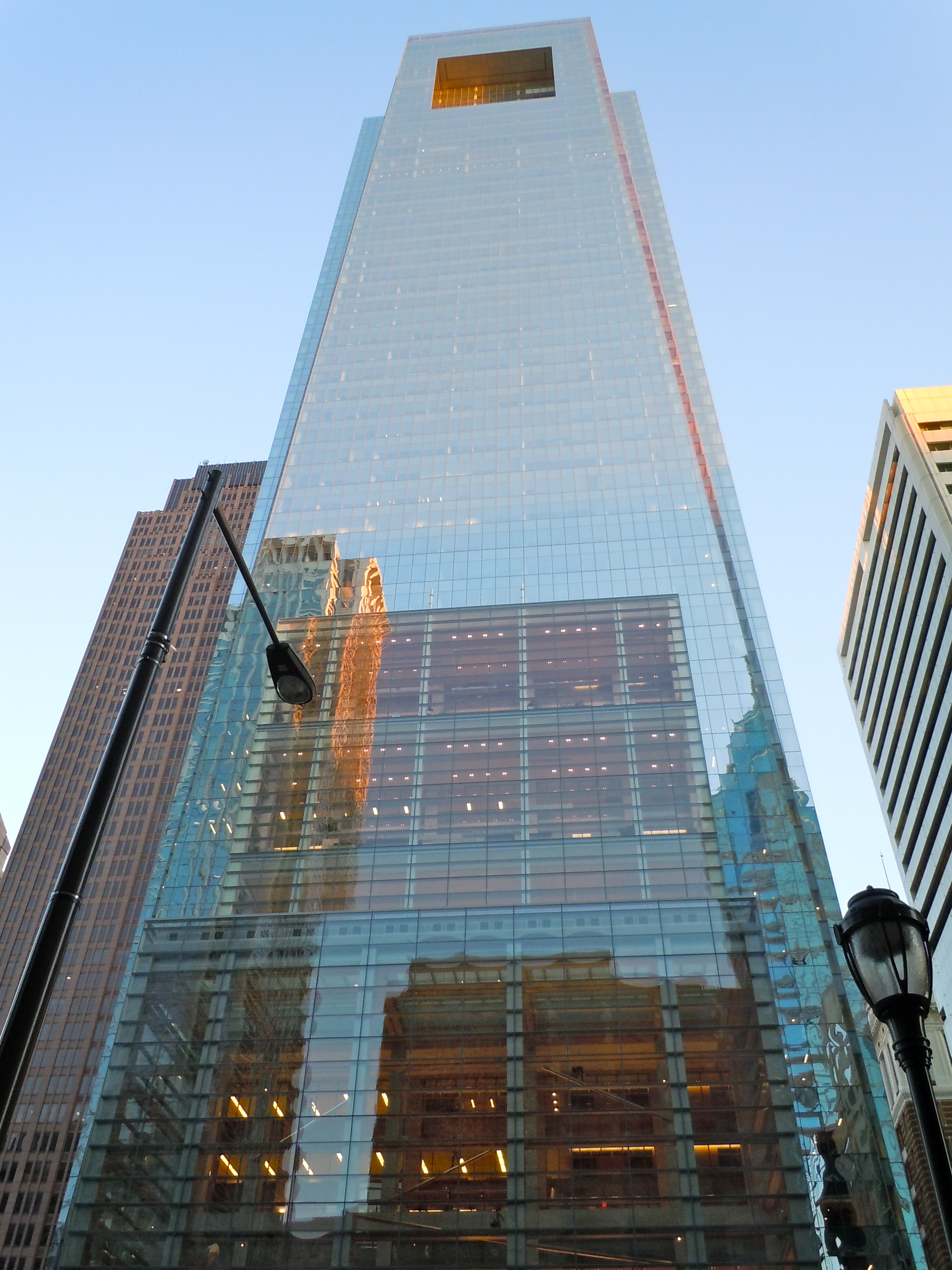
The 58-story Comcast Center in Center City, the second-tallest building in Philadelphia and 23rd-tallest building in the nation

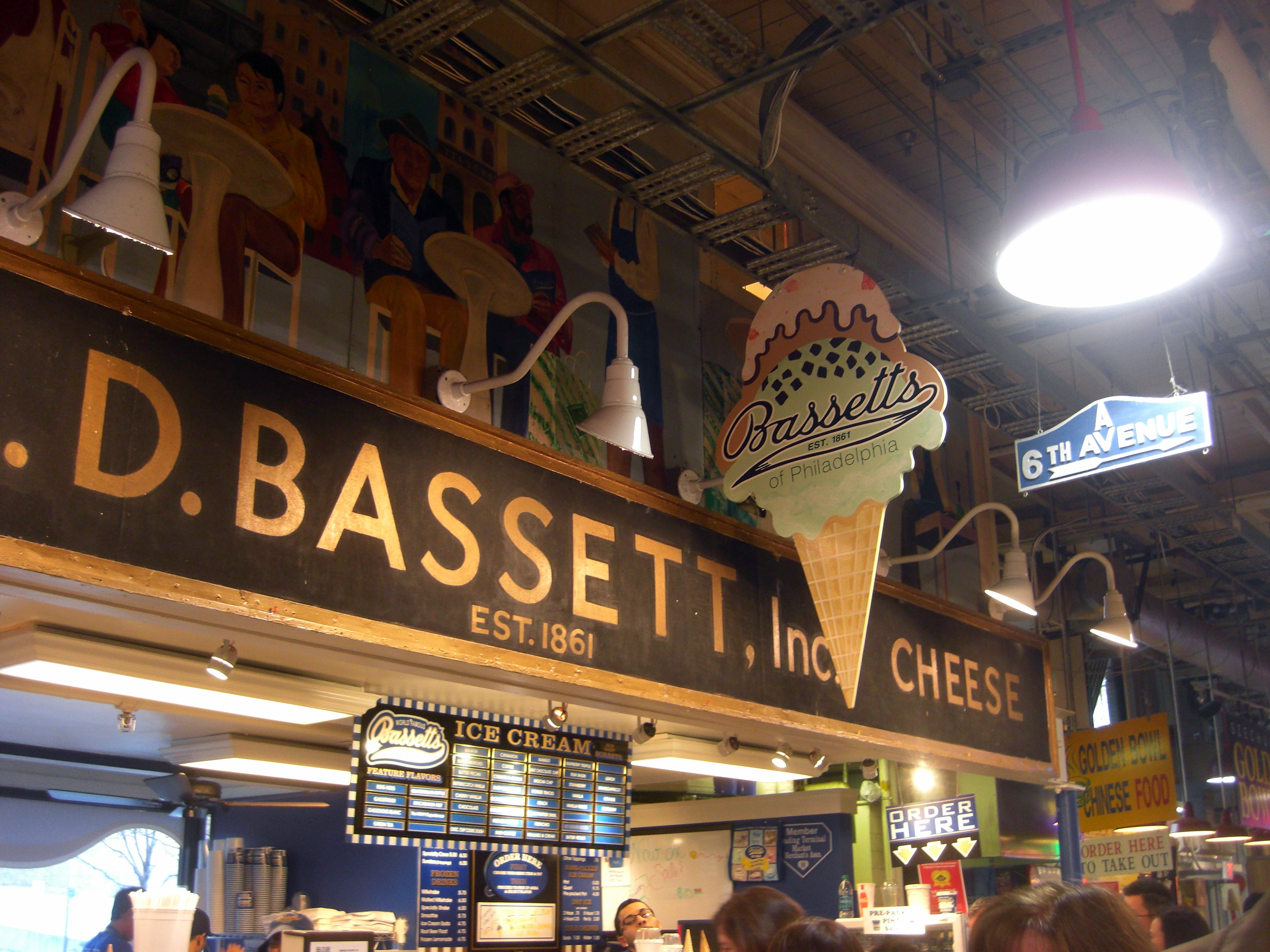
Reading Terminal Market in Center City in January 2011

Sunoco has its headquarters in the BNY Mellon Center. Cigna has its corporate headquarters in 2 Liberty Place. Aramark is headquartered in Center City on the east bank of the Schuylkill River on Market Street. Comcast is headquartered in the Comcast Center. The law firm Cozen O'Connor has its headquarters in Center City. Kogan Page has its U.S. headquarters in Center City.

Lincoln National Corporation moved its headquarters from Fort Wayne, Indiana to Philadelphia in 1999. In Philadelphia Lincoln was headquartered in the West Tower of Centre Square in Center City. In 2007, the company moved 400 employees, including its top executives, to Radnor Township from Philadelphia.

== Government and infrastructure ==
=== Buildings ===
Center City is home to some of the largest and most prominent buildings in the United States, including:

- 1818 Market Street
- Centre Square
- Comcast Center, the 23rd tallest skyscraper in the nation
- Liberty Place
- Philadelphia City Hall, the world's largest free-standing masonry building
- Three Logan Square

=== Infrastructure ===
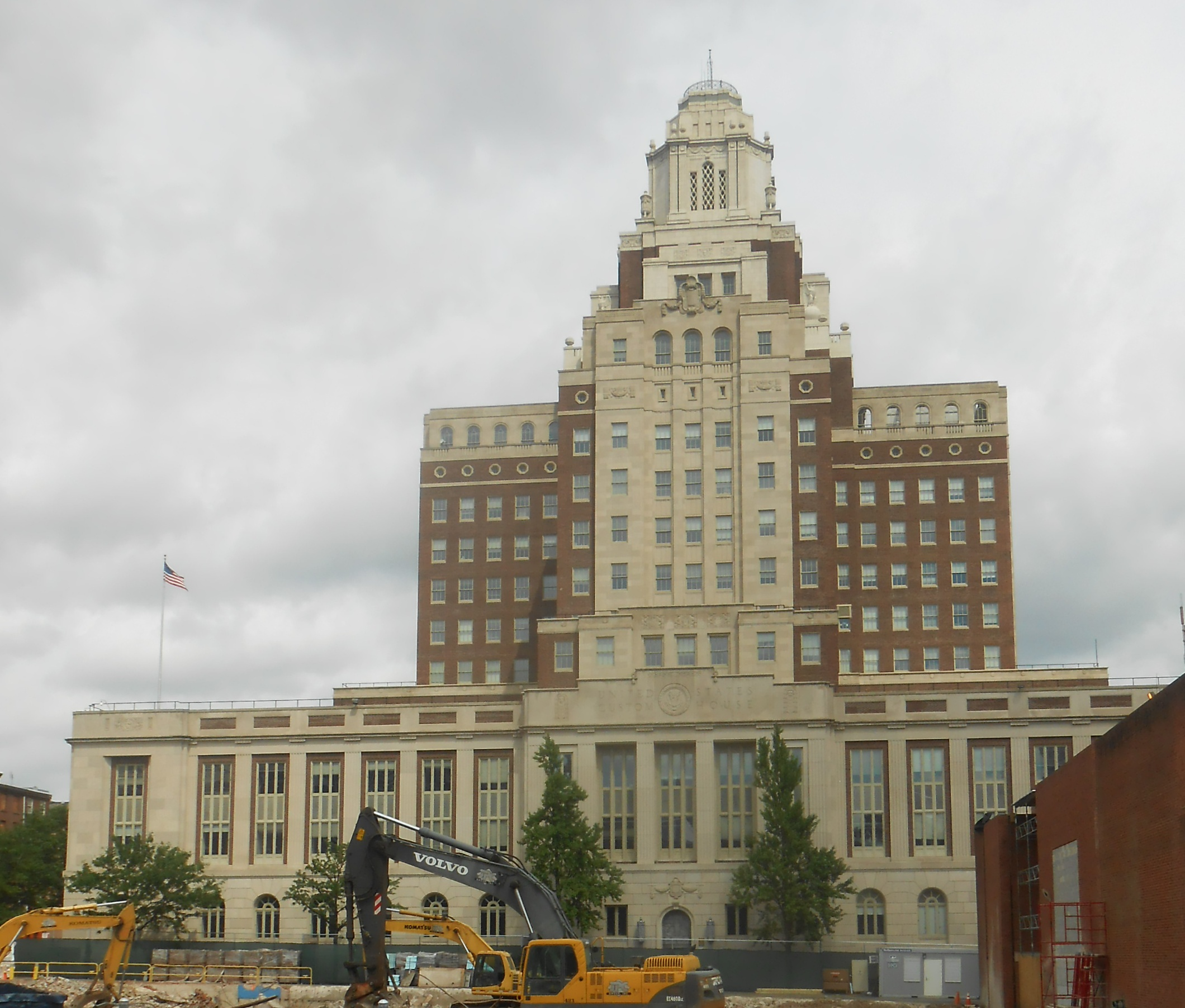
The U.S. Custom House in Old City in July 2014

The Philadelphia Fire Department operates five fire stations in Center City:

- Engine 1,Ladder 5,Medic Unit 35, Battalion Chief Unit 1 - 711 S. Broad St.
- Snorkel 2, Medic Unit 44B, Battalion Chief Unit 4, Field Comm.Unit 1 - 101 N. 4th St.
- Engine 11, Medic Unit 21 - 601 South St.
- Pipeline 20, Ladder 23, Medic Unit 1 - 133 N. 10th St.
- Squirt 43, Ladder 9, Medic Unit 7 - 2108 Market St.

The Federal Bureau of Prisons Northeast Region Office is in the U.S. Custom House, a part of the Independence National Historical Park, in Old City, Center City.

The William J. Green Jr. Federal Building houses the Federal Bureau of Investigation Philadelphia Field Office.

=== Diplomatic offices and consulates ===
The Consulate-General of Italy in Philadelphia is located in the 1026 Public Ledger Building at 150 South Independence Mall West. The Consulate-General of Panama in Philadelphia is located in Suite 1 at 124 Chestnut Street. The Consulate of Mexico in Philadelphia is located in Suite 310 of the Bourse Building off of Independence Mall.

The Consulate-General of the Dominican Republic in Philadelphia was located in Suite 216 in the Lafayette Building at 437 Chestnut Street. It closed on November 7, 2005. The Consulate-General of Israel in Philadelphia was located on the 18th Floor at 1880 John F. Kennedy Boulevard. Israel closed the Philadelphia consulate in 2016.

== Education ==
=== Public schools ===
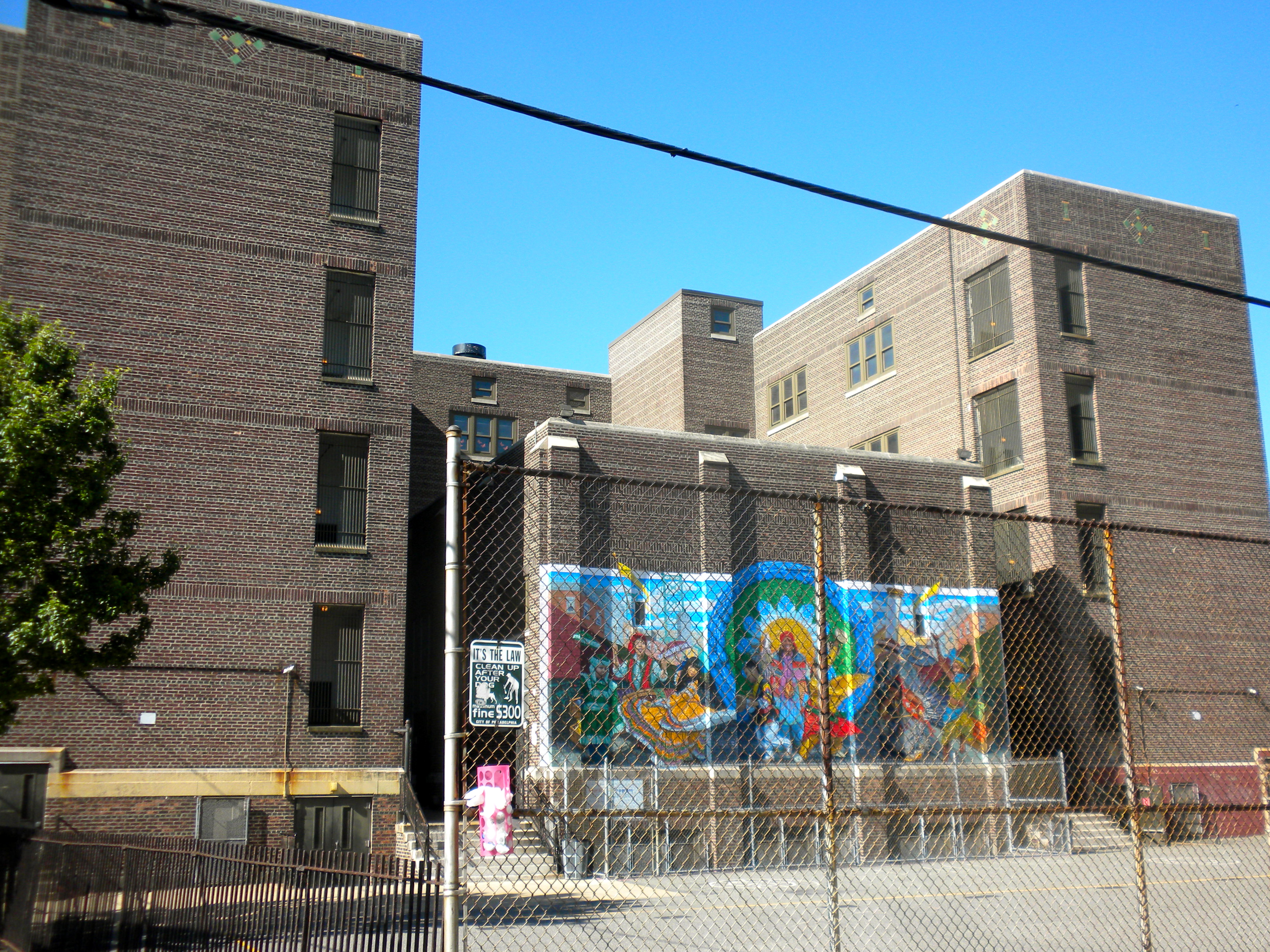
George W. Nebinger School in the Bella Vista neighborhood in May 2010

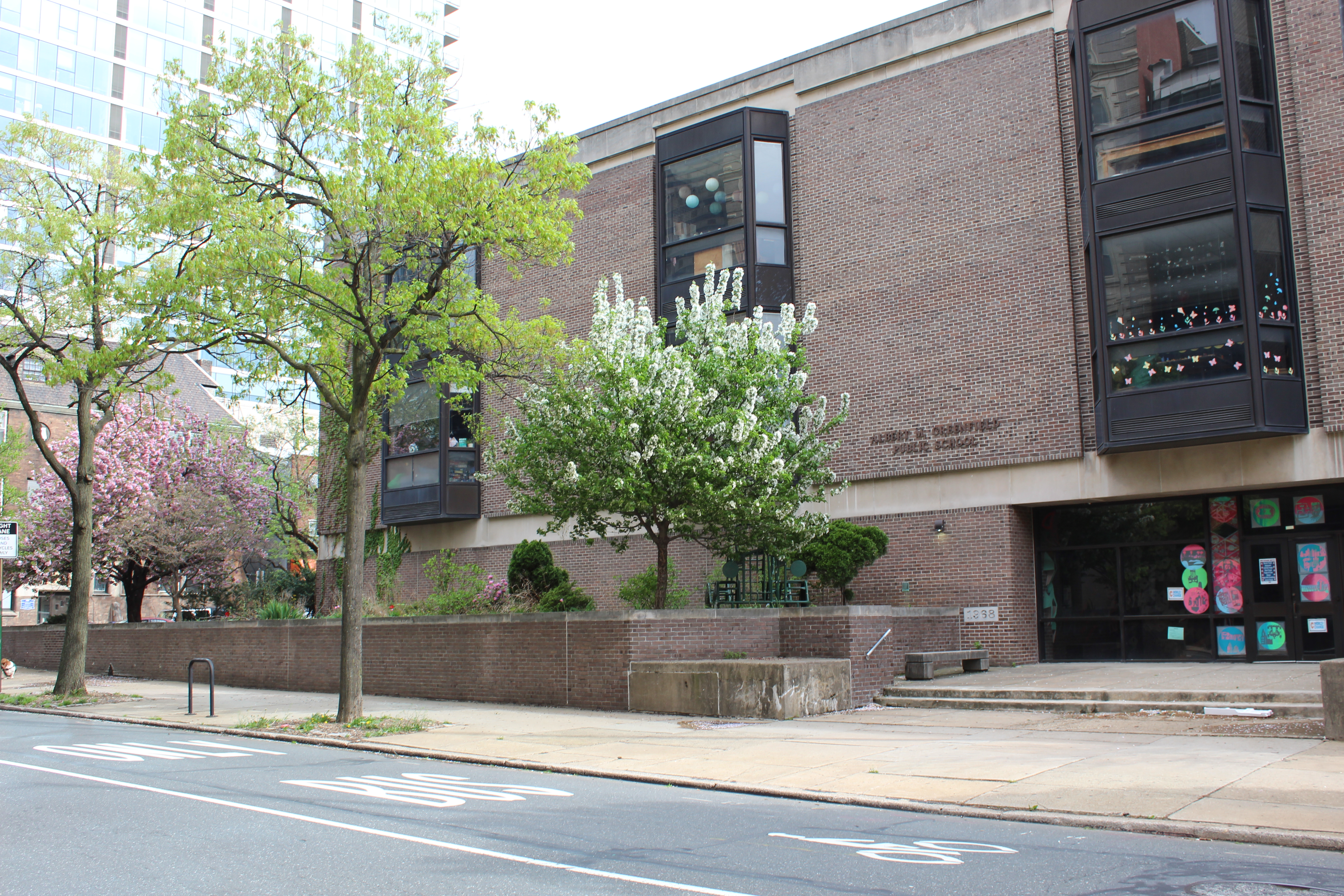
Albert M. Greenfield School on Chestnut Street in Center City in April 2019

Residents of Center City are included within the School District of Philadelphia. From the 1940s to the opening of what is now known as the Greenfield School in 1954, many residents attended public schools in other areas and private schools due to the low number of public schools in Center City.

In 2005, in an attempt to slow the flight of middle-class families, the school district and Center City District, an economic development agency, launched a program that promoted public schools in Center City, including Rittenhouse Square and Society Hill, and adjacent areas in Fairmount, Northern Liberties, and South Philadelphia.

K-8 schools that have attendance boundaries in Center City and areas around Center City include:

- Albert M. Greenfield
  - It opened in September 1954 as the Center City School after the Center City Residents Association (CCRA) advocated for its establishment. It was initially housed in a YWCA and later in the former Jerrold Electronics Building. In 1964 the school district bought the site for a permanent campus, which began construction in 1966 and opened in September 1970.
- Andrew Jackson School
- Bache-Martin
- Chester A. Arthur
- Edwin M. Stanton
- General Philip Kearny
- George A. McCall School
- George W. Nebinger School
- James R. Ludlow
- Laura Wheeler Waring
- Spring Garden School
- William H. Harrison
- William M. Meredith School

Neighborhood high schools for Center City and the Center City area, located outside of Center City, include:

- Benjamin Franklin High School
- Furness High School
- South Philadelphia High School

Other high schools include:

- Bodine High School for International Affairs
- Constitution High School for American Studies
- Franklin Learning Center High School
- Parkway Center City Middle College
- Philadelphia High School for Business and Technology
- Science Leadership Academy

Combined middle and high schools include:

- Julia R. Masterman School

==== Charter schools ====
Charter schools not operated by the School District of Philadelphia include:

- Grades 1–12:
  - Mathematics, Civics and Sciences Charter School
- Grades 7–12:
- The Mastery Charter Schools system operates the Mastery Charter Lenfest Campus (7-12) in Old City. It moved from North Philadelphia to Old City in 2002.
- Grades 5–8:
  - Freire Charter Middle School
- Grades 6–12:
  - World Communications Charter School
- Grades 9–12:
  - Architecture and Design Charter School
  - Freire Charter High School
  - Mastery Charter High School
  - Philadelphia Electrical and Technology Charter School
- Grades K–8:
  - Laboratory Charter School of Communication and Languages
  - Folk Arts-Cultural Treasures Charter School
- Grades 6–8:
  - Wakisha Charter School
- Grades K–7:
  - Christopher Columbus Charter School
  - Independence Charter School grades K–8
  - People for People Charter School
- Grades Pre-K-8:
  - Russell Byers Charter School
- Grades K–6:
  - Universal Institute Charter School

=== Private schools ===
==== Roman Catholic parochial schools ====
The Roman Catholic Archdiocese of Philadelphia operates the following Roman Catholic parochial schools in the Center City area :

- Grades 9-12:
  - J. W. Hallahan Catholic Girls High School
  - Roman Catholic High School
- Grades Pre-K-8:
  - St. Francis Xavier School
  - St. Peter the Apostle School
- Grades K-8:
  - St. Mary's Interparochial School
- Grades 1-8:
  - Holy Redeemer School

==== Other private schools ====
Other private schools in the Center City area include:

- Grades Pre-K-12:
  - Friends Select School
- Grades 9-12:
  - City Center Academy
- Grades Pre-K-8:
  - St. Peter's School
  - The Philadelphia School

=== Public libraries ===
The Free Library of Philadelphia operates the Parkway Central Library at 1901 Vine Street, the Independence Branch at 18 South 7th Street, the Philadelphia City Institute on the first floor and lower level of an apartment complex at 1905 Locust Street, and the Library for the Blind and Physically Handicapped at 919 Walnut Street.

=== Other institutions ===
Middle States Association of Colleges and Schools is headquartered in Center City.

== Culture ==
=== Music and theatre ===
Center City Philadelphia is home to some of the nation and world's leading cultural institutions. Avenue of the Arts, a city-designated cultural district, includes Kimmel Center for the Performing Arts, which houses the Philadelphia Orchestra (a Big Five orchestra) and the Academy of Music, home of the Philadelphia Ballet and Opera Philadelphia. The avenue is home to multiple theatres, including the Miller, Suzanne Roberts, and Wilma theatres. Forrest Theatre is also located in center city, at 1114 Walnut Street.

=== Museums ===
Mütter Museum, a medical museum, is located in center city at 19 S. 22nd Street.

Museum of the American Revolution

African American Museum in Philadelphia

Weitzman National Museum of American Jewish History

=== Recreation ===
Center City Philadelphia has a vast number of restaurants, bars, and nightclubs. McGillin's Olde Ale House, at 1310 Drury Street, is one of the nation's oldest pubs (founded in 1860).

== Transportation ==
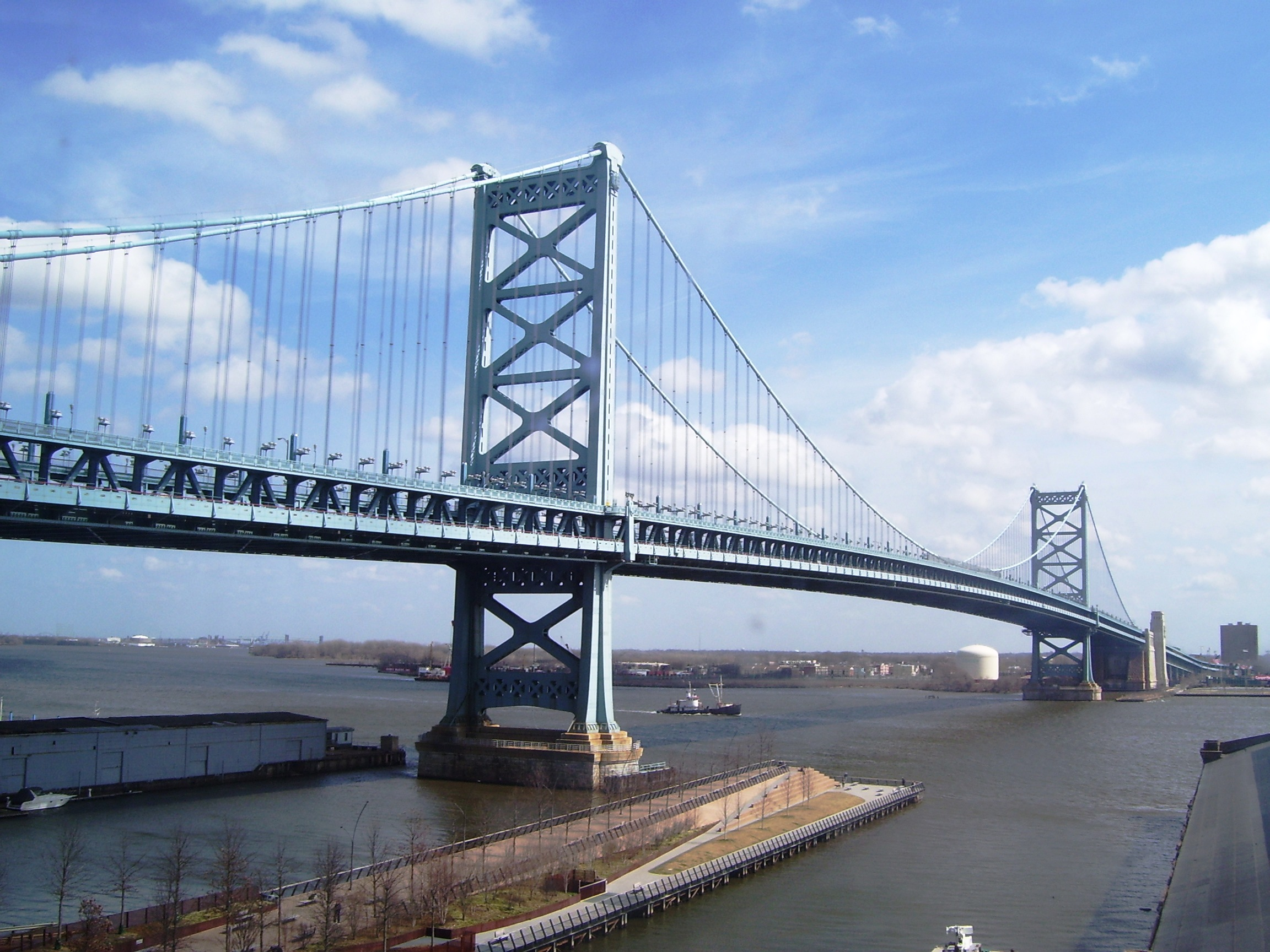
Benjamin Franklin Bridge, a 2,917.86 meters (9,573.0 ft) bridge connecting Center City with Camden, New Jersey in March 2012

=== Major highways ===
- Interstate 76
- Interstate 95
- Interstate 676/Benjamin Franklin Bridge
- U.S. Route 30
- PA Route 3
- PA Route 611

=== Streets and bridges ===
Center city streets and bridges include Benjamin Franklin Bridge, which connects the city with Camden, New Jersey, and Benjamin Franklin Parkway, a one-mile long parkway that runs from Philadelphia City Hall to the Philadelphia Museum of Art. Three major center city streets are Broad, Market, and South Streets.

=== Local public transit ===
- Center City Commuter Connection
- SEPTA
  - Jefferson Station (Regional Rail)
  - Suburban Station (Regional Rail)
  - Market-Frankford Line (2nd Street, 5th Street/Independence Hall, 8th Street, 11th Street, 13th Street, and 15th Street stations)
  - Broad Street Line (Spring Garden, Race-Vine, City Hall, Walnut-Locust and Lombard-South stations on main line; Chinatown and 8th Street stations on Broad-Ridge Spur)
  - Subway-surface trolley lines (13th Street, 15th Street, 19th Street, and 22nd Street stations; all stations on Market Street)
  - Various bus routes
- PATCO Speedline (Franklin Square, 8th & Market, 9-10th & Locust, 12-13th & Locust, and 15-16th & Locust Street stations)
- New Jersey Transit (various bus routes & stops)

There is a 500,000+ sq ft underground pedestrian concourse that connects many of the center city Septa stations to businesses and office buildings. Primarily running under Market Street and Broad Street, the concourse spans east to west from 8th street to 18th street and north to south from John F. Kennedy Boulevard to Spruce Street.

=== Intercity public transit ===
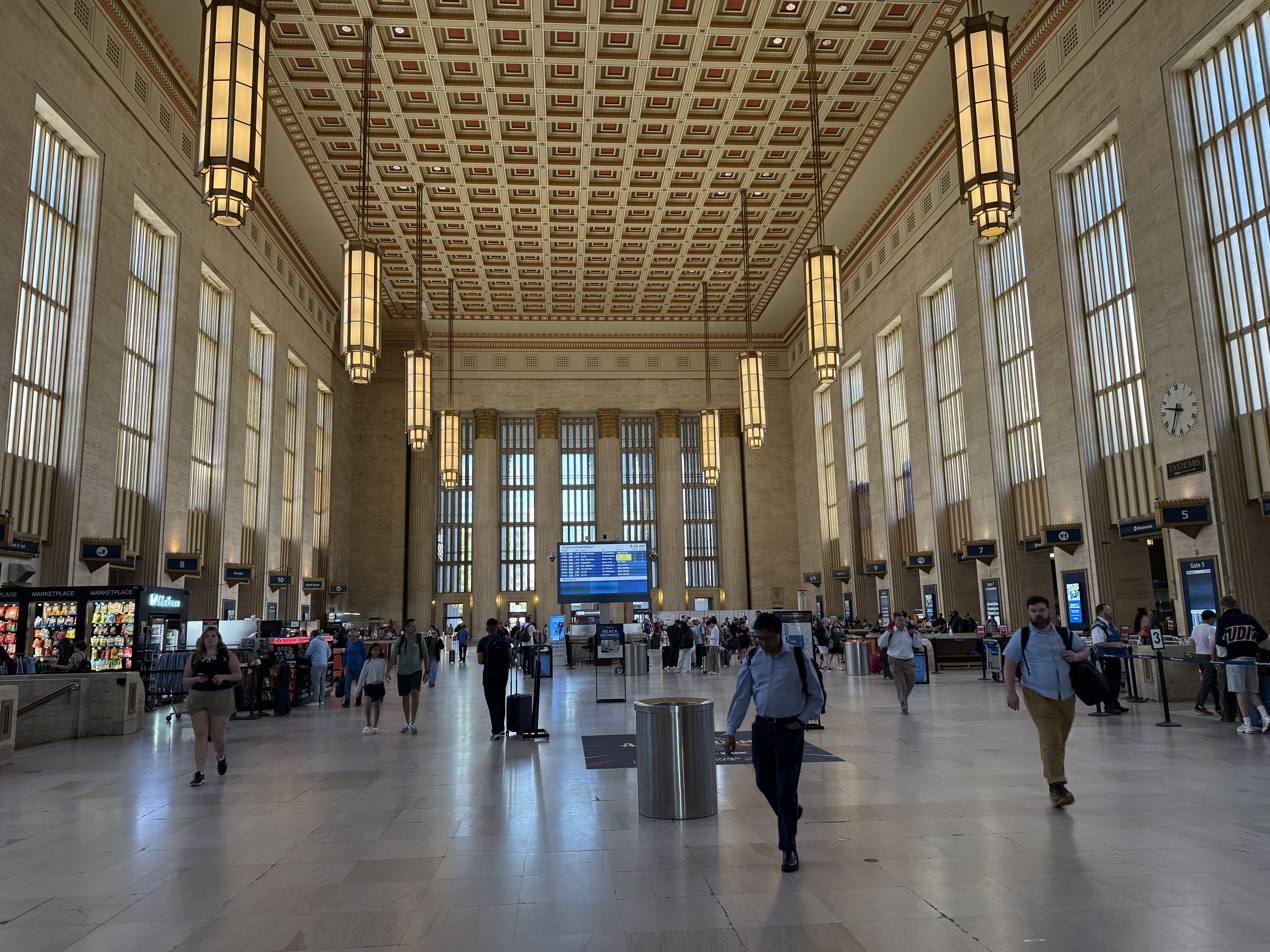
Interior of Philadelphia's 30th Street Station, one of the nation's busiest passenger train stations

- Greyhound at two locations:
  - 618 Market
  - JFK and 30th Street
- Peter Pan, and various Trailways buses at 618 Market Street
- Megabus (30th Street Station)
- Various Chinatown bus lines (various operators & stops; most stops near 11th & Arch Streets)

Amtrak's primary Philadelphia station, 30th Street Station, is located immediately west of Center City, just across the Schuylkill River. SEPTA Regional Rail trains, New Jersey Transit Atlantic City Line trains, Market-Frankford Line trains, and subway-surface line trolleys also service 30th Street Station, and both Megabus and BoltBus stop on streets adjacent to the station.

As of 2016 Taiwanese airline China Airlines provides a private bus service to and from John F. Kennedy International Airport in New York City for customers based in the Philadelphia area. This service previously stopped in Center City in front of the Marriott Hotel.

== Center City Residents' Association ==
The Center City Residents' Association, originally formed in 1947 to prevent Rittenhouse Square from being turned into a parking lot, is a primary advocate for quality of life issues in Center City. Other community organizations of this type include Logan Square Neighborhood Association, Society Hill Civic Association, South of South Street Neighborhood Association, Washington Square West Civic Association, and the Queen Village Neighbors Association.

== Gallery ==
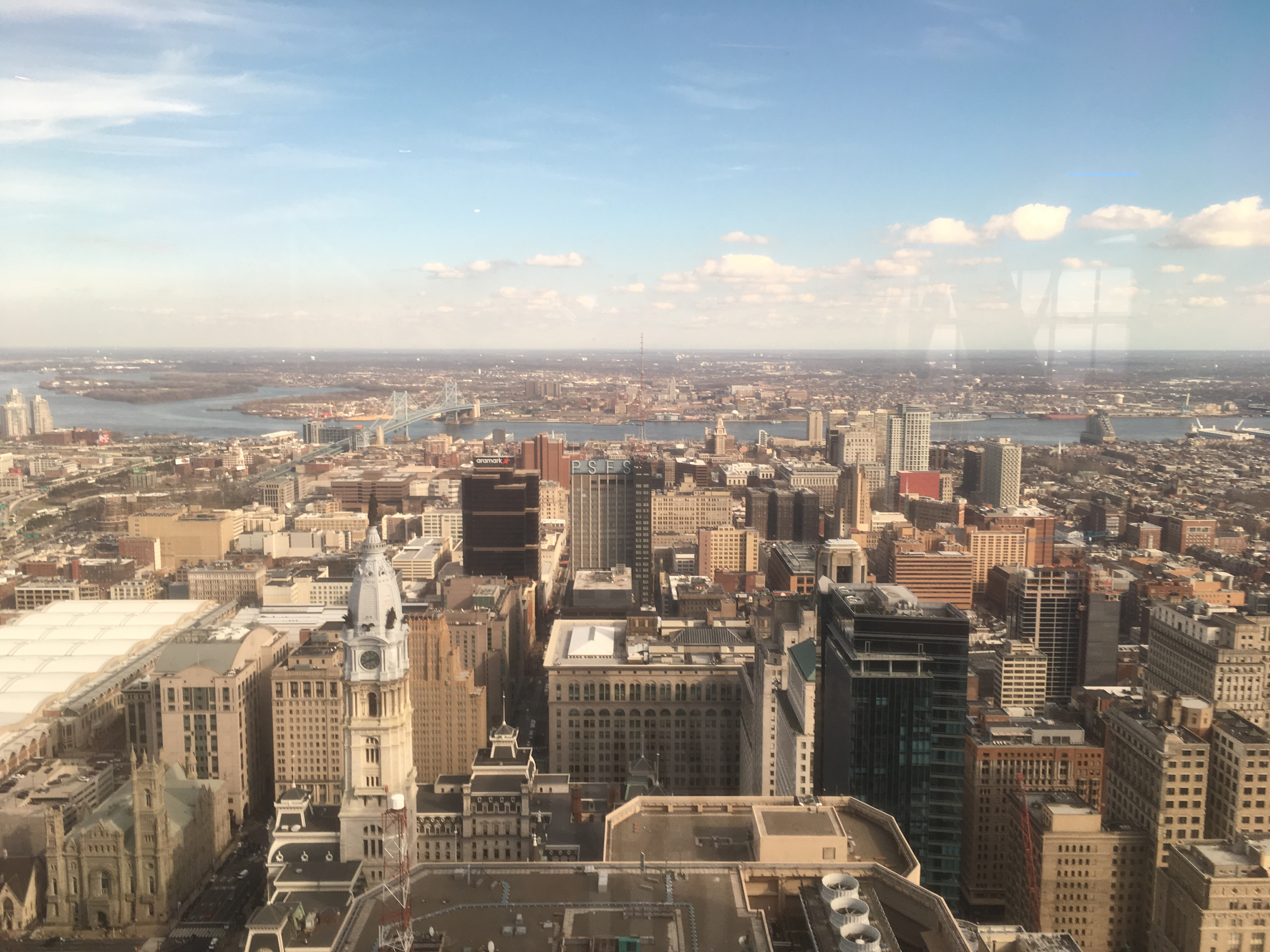
The eastern portion of Center City from the One Liberty Observation Deck

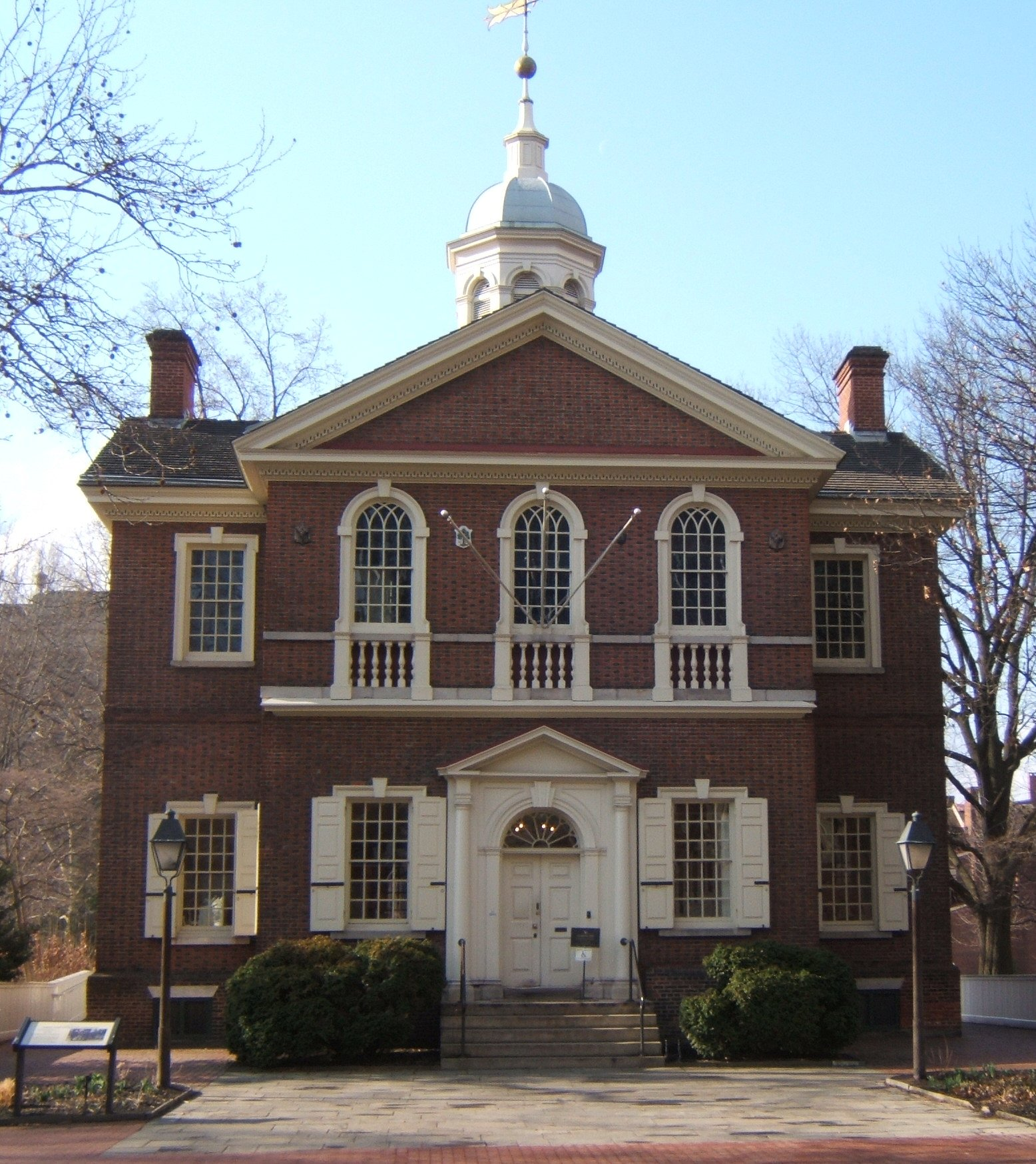
Carpenters' Hall

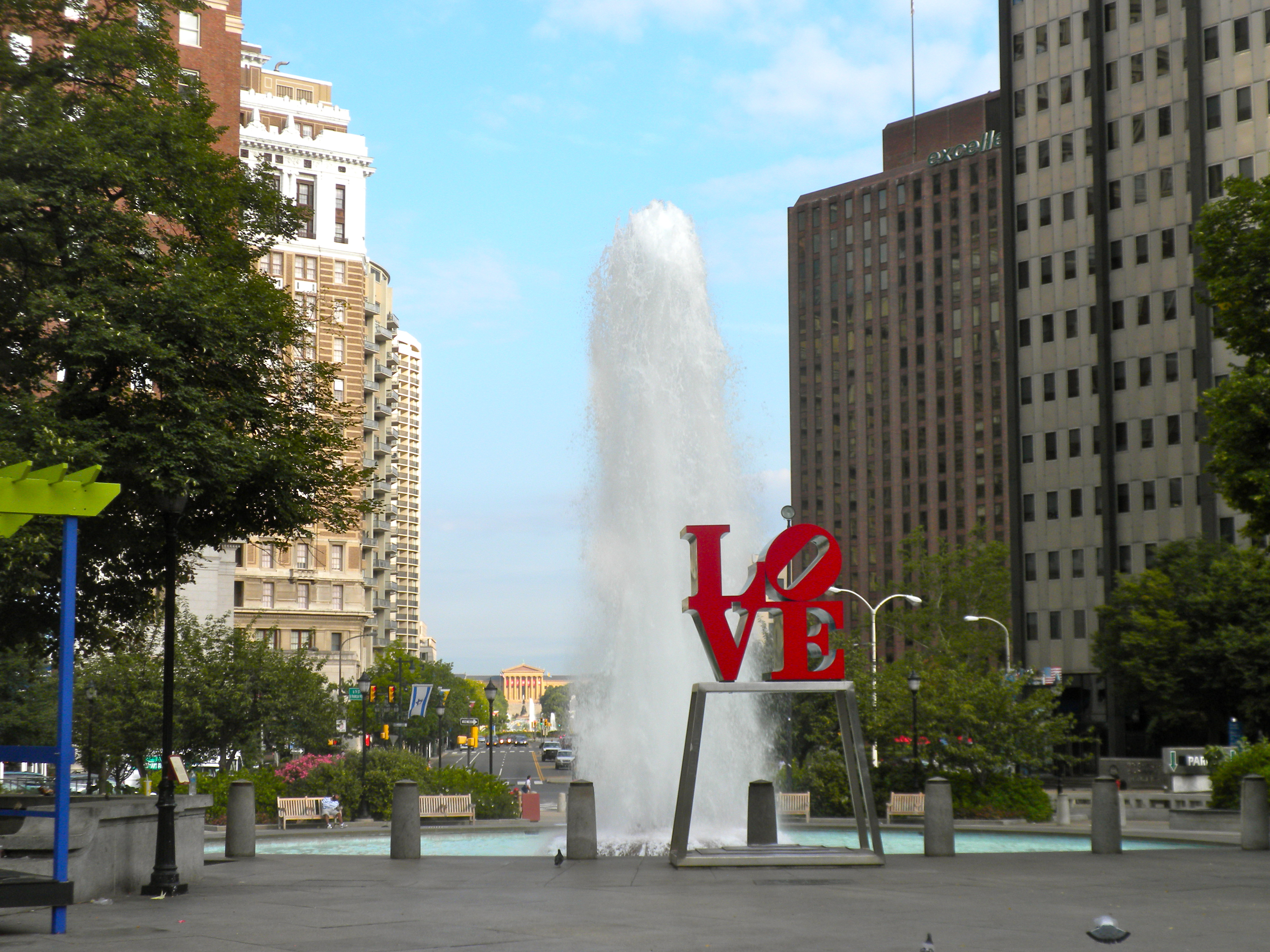
LOVE Park with the Philadelphia Museum of Art in the distant background

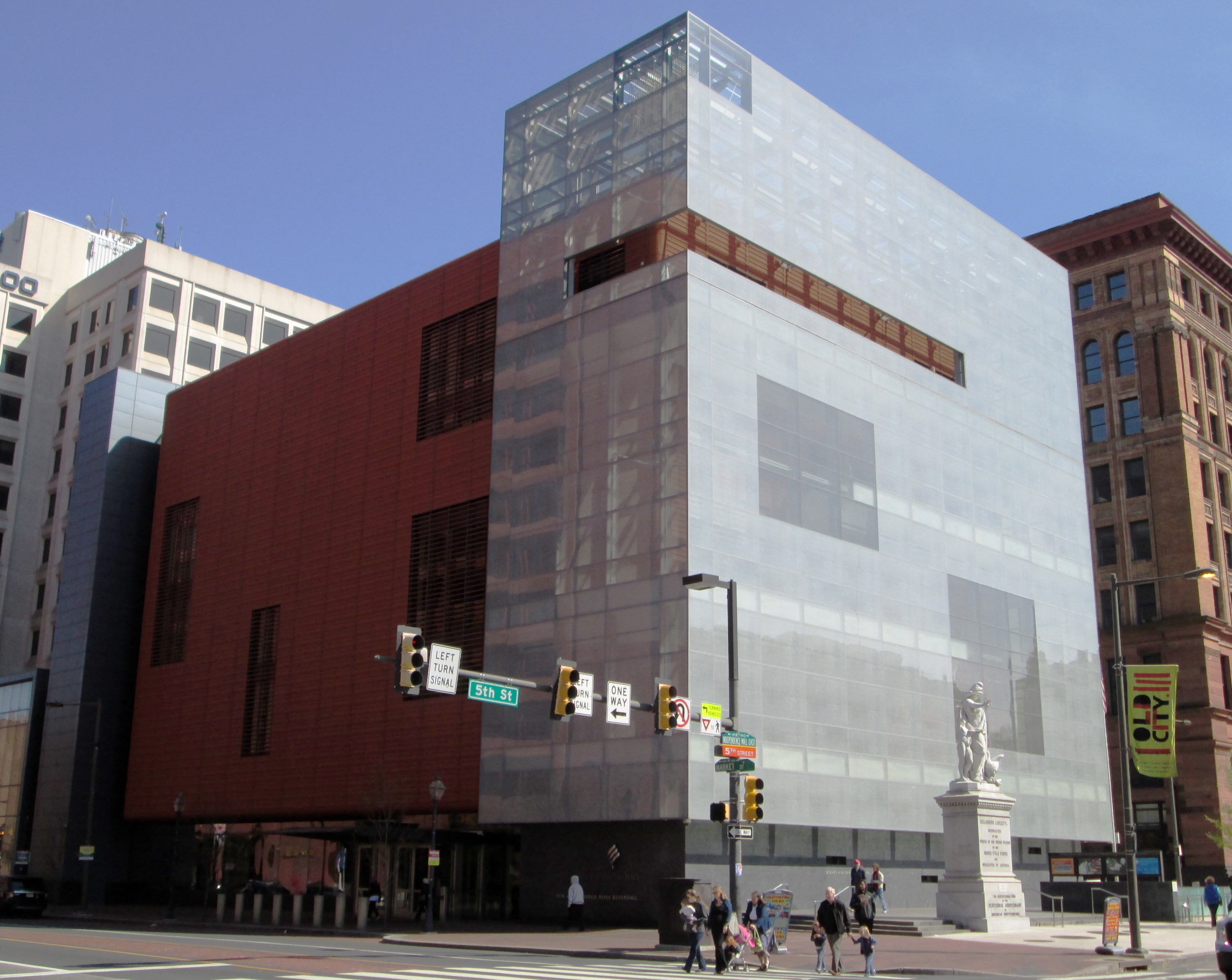
Weitzman National Museum of American Jewish History

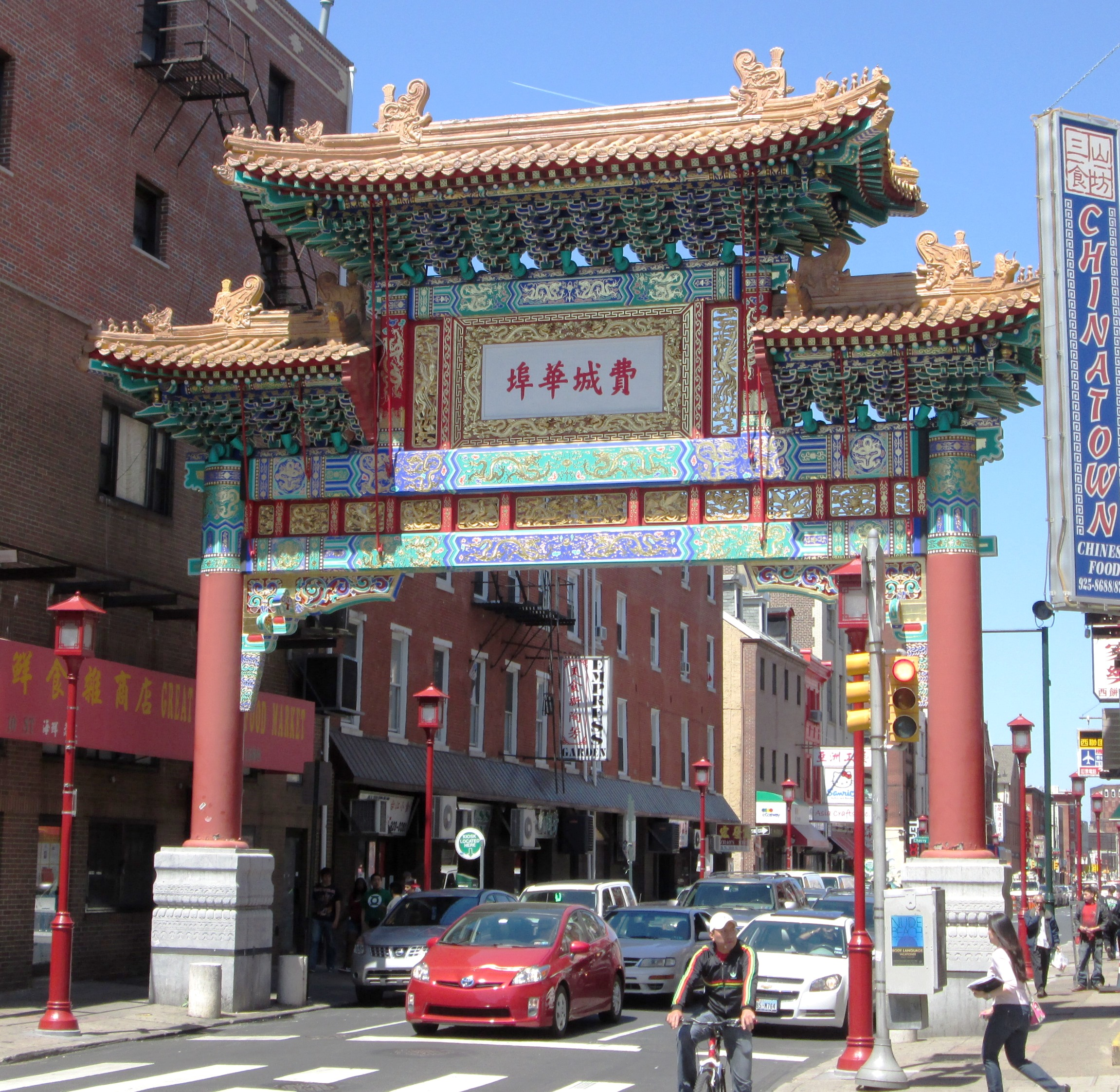
Friendship Gate in Chinatown

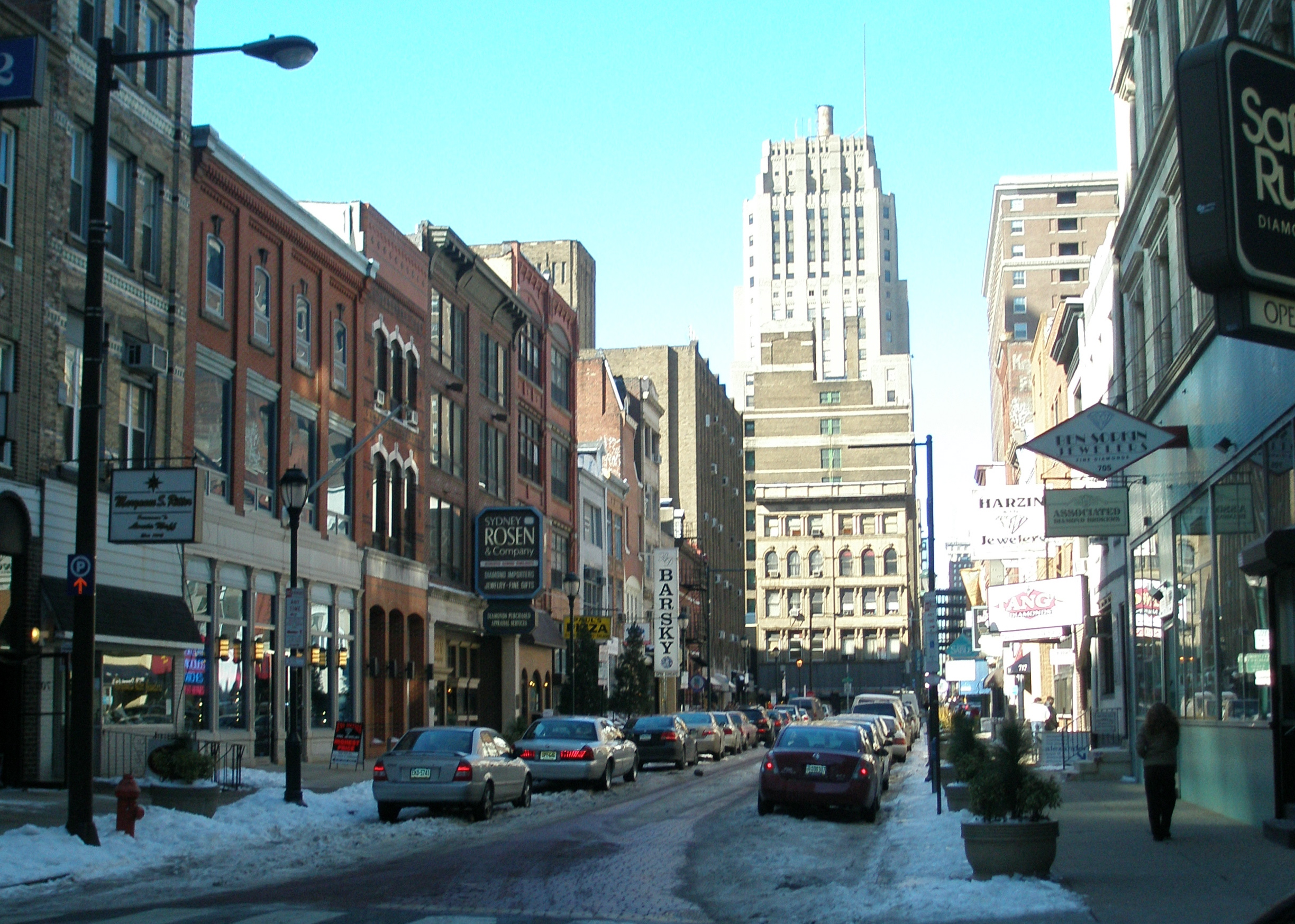
Jewelers' Row

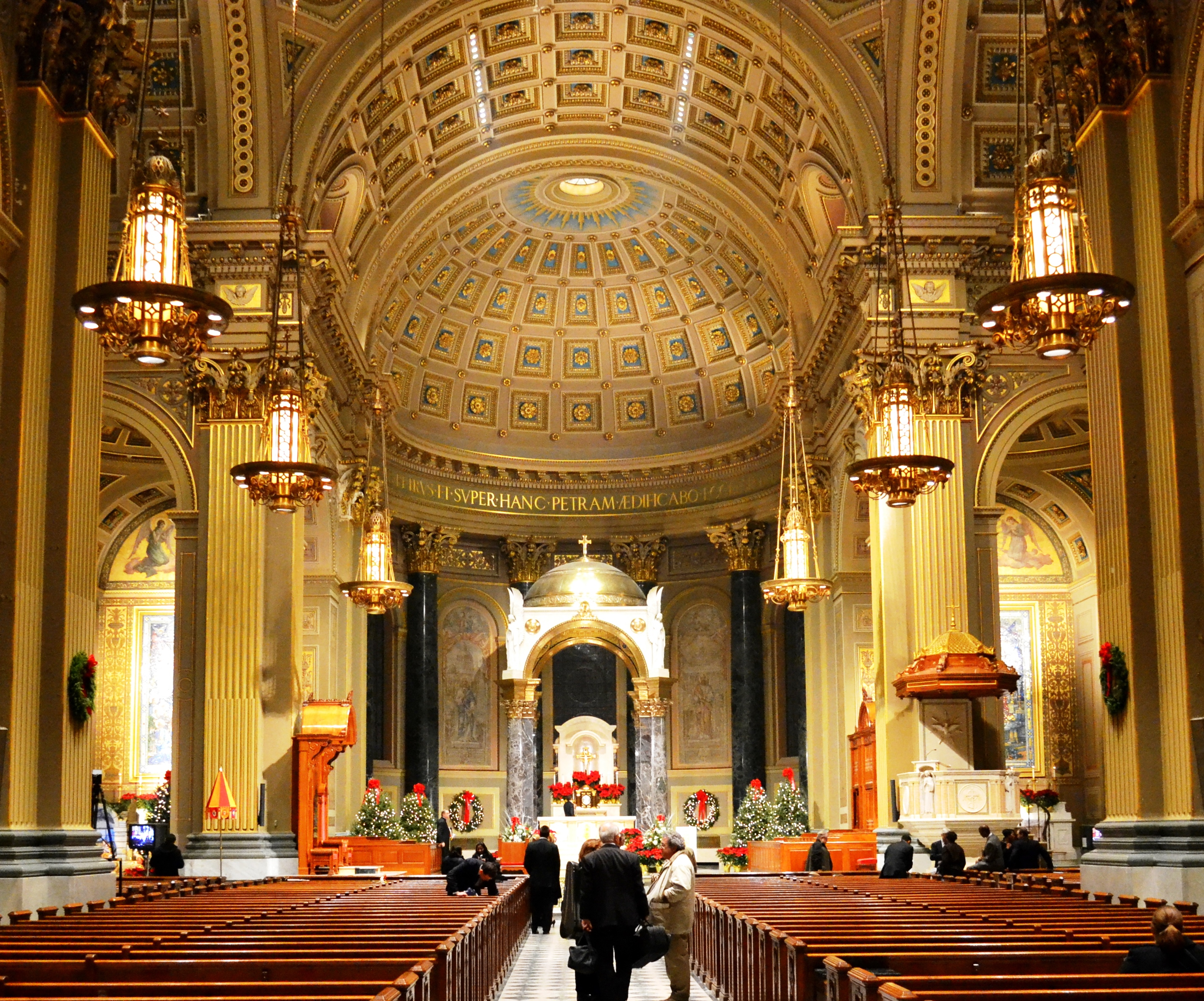
Interior of the Cathedral of Saints Peter and Paul

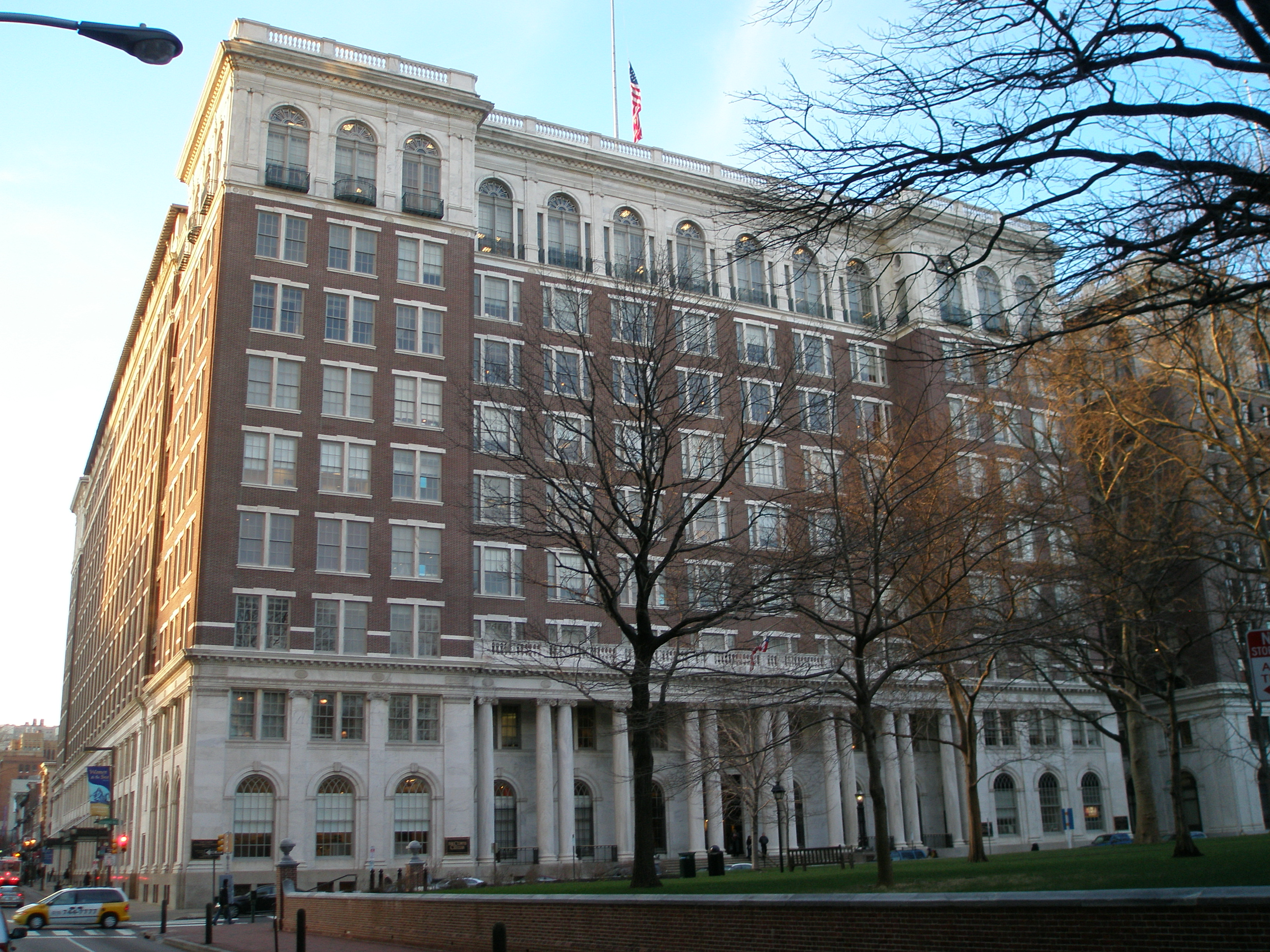
Curtis Center

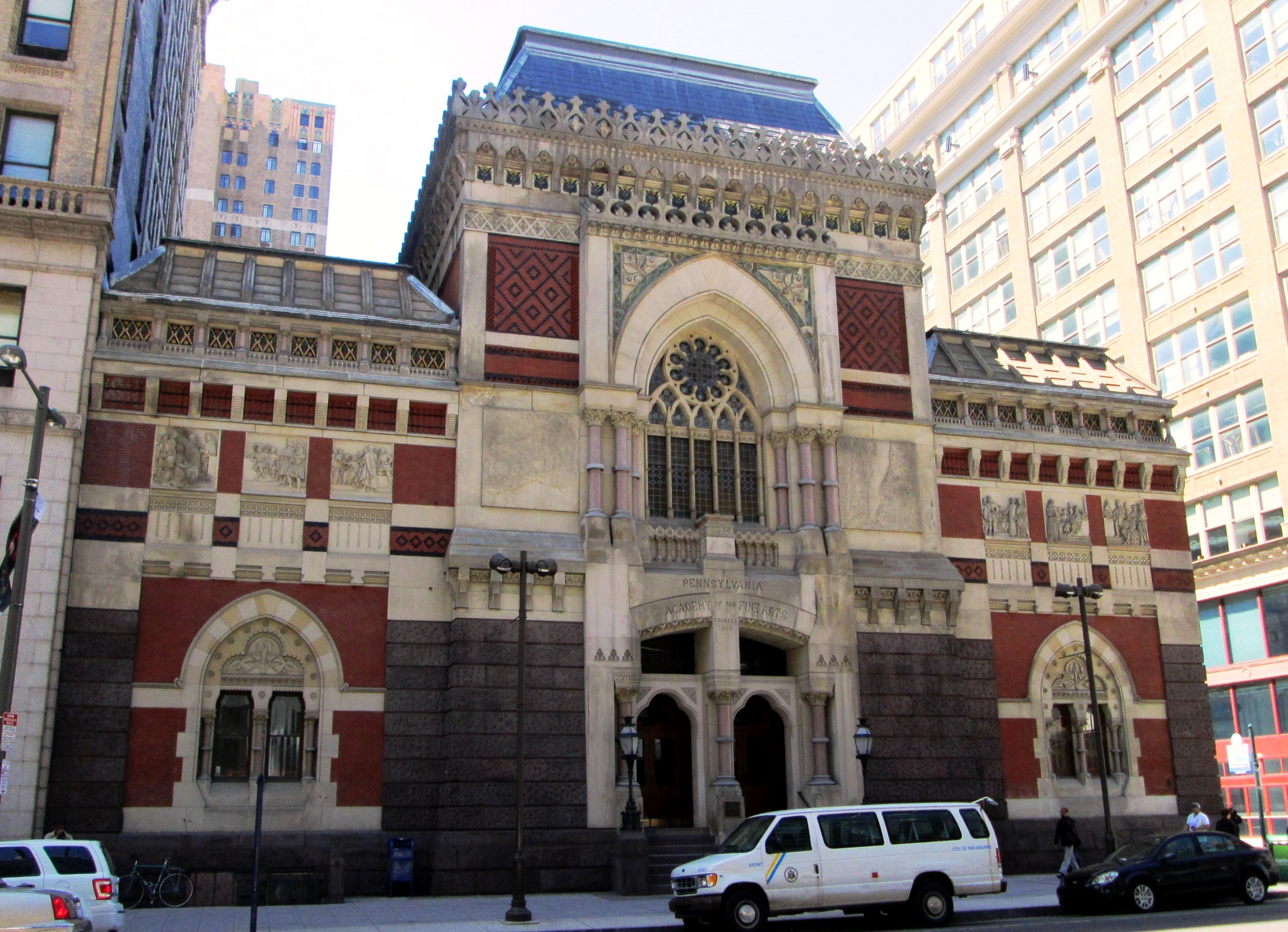
Pennsylvania Academy of the Fine Arts

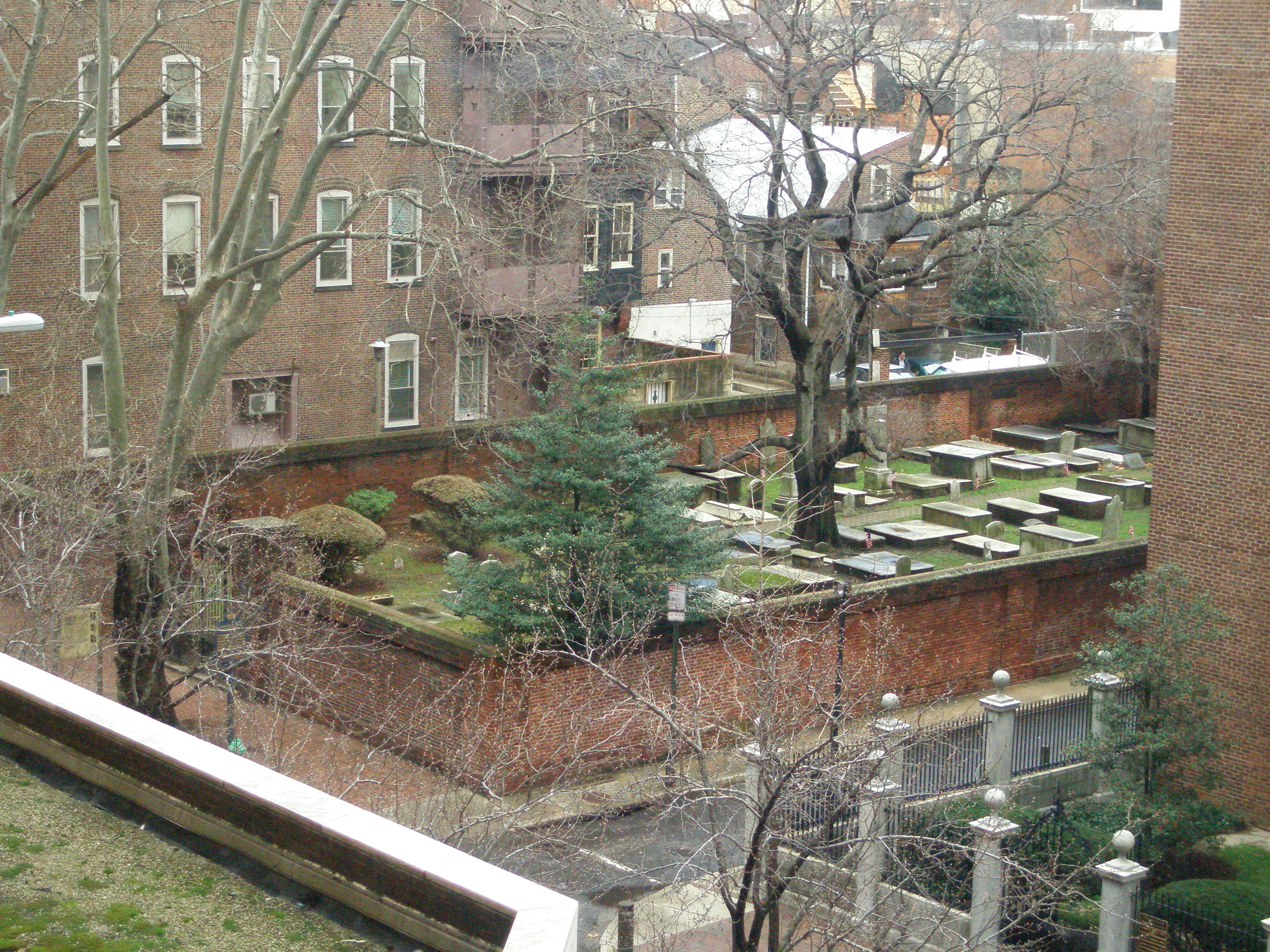
Mikveh Israel Cemetery

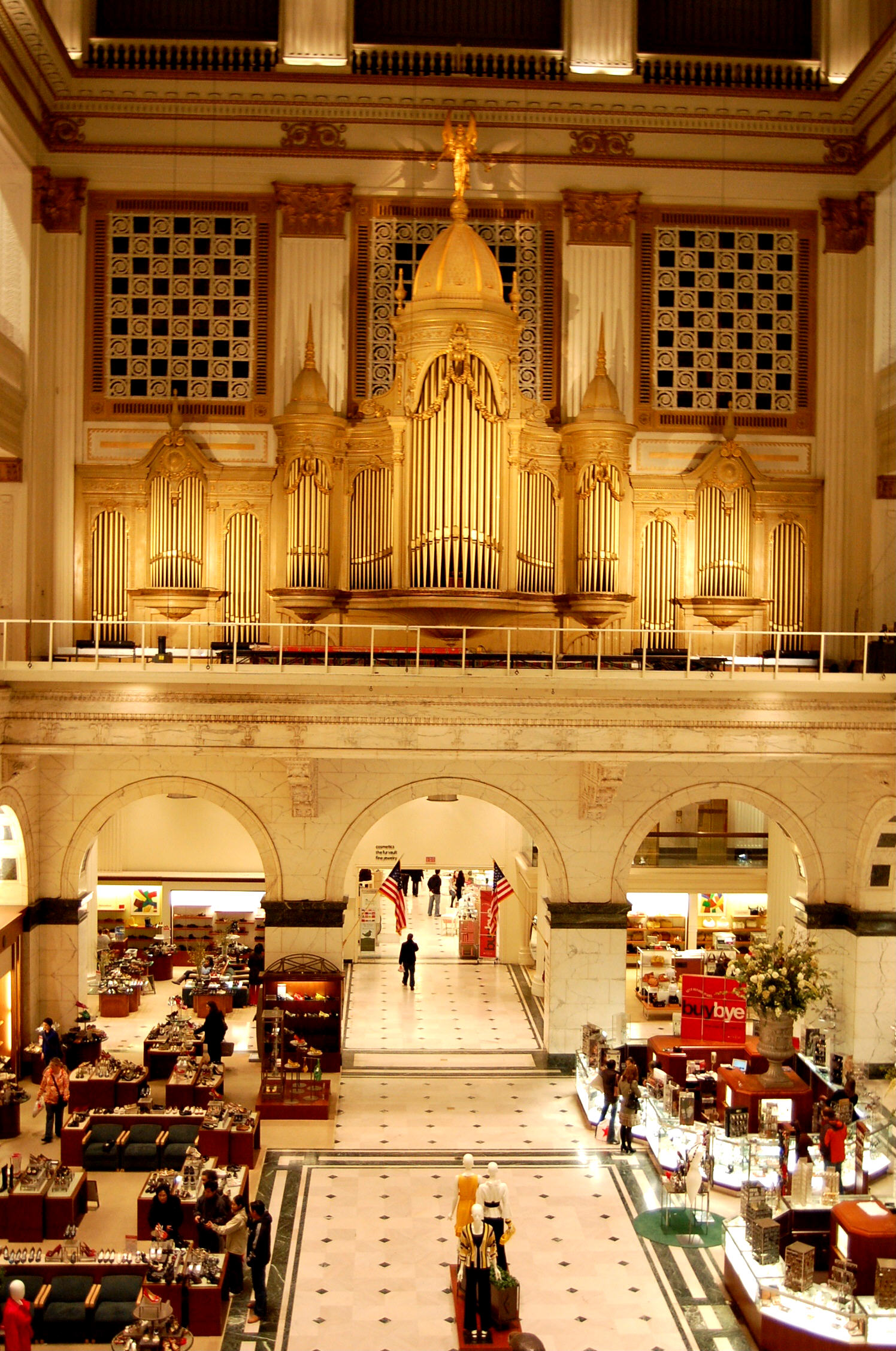
The Grand Court at Macys Department Store (in the Wanamaker's building)

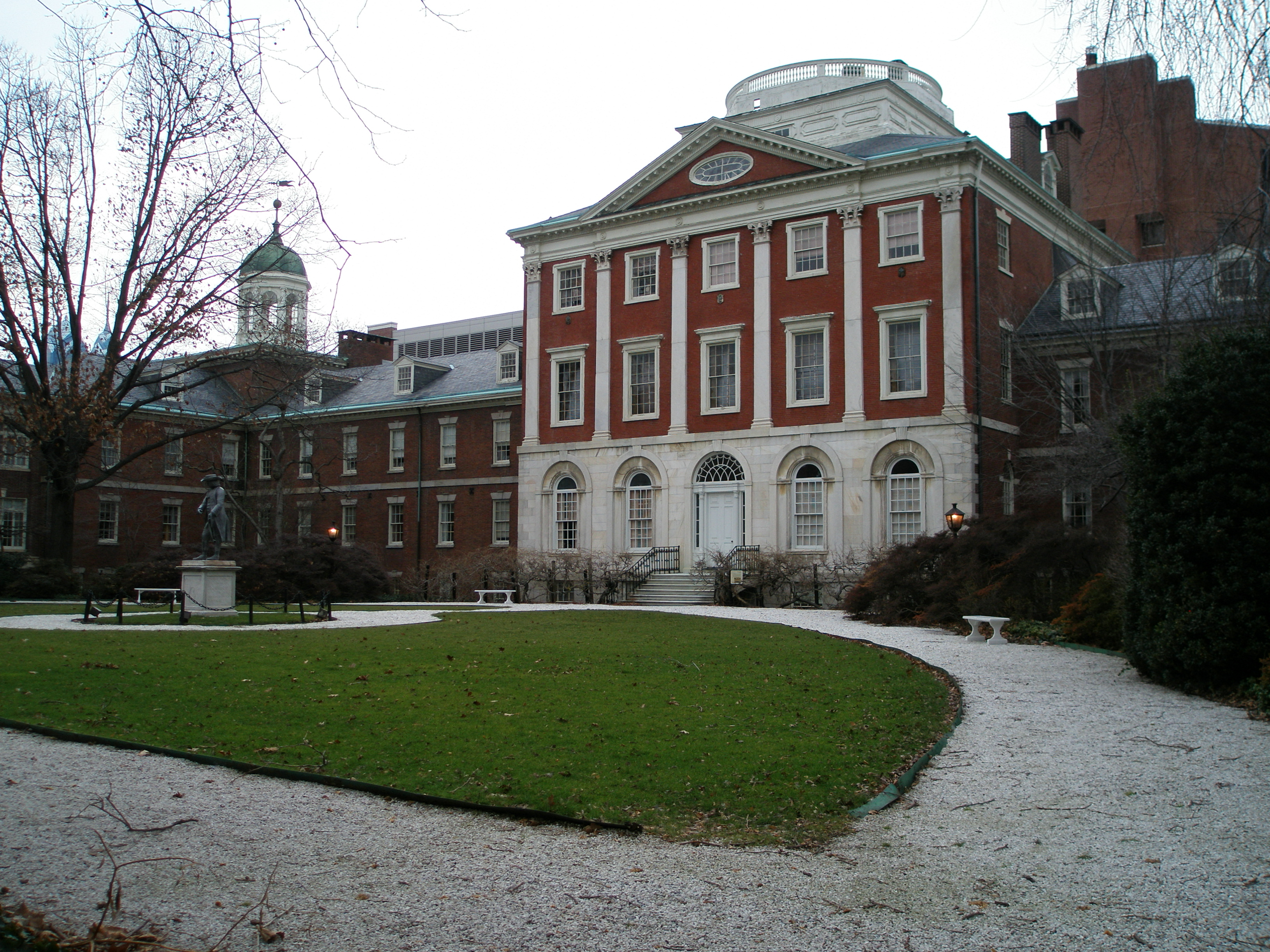
Pennsylvania Hospital

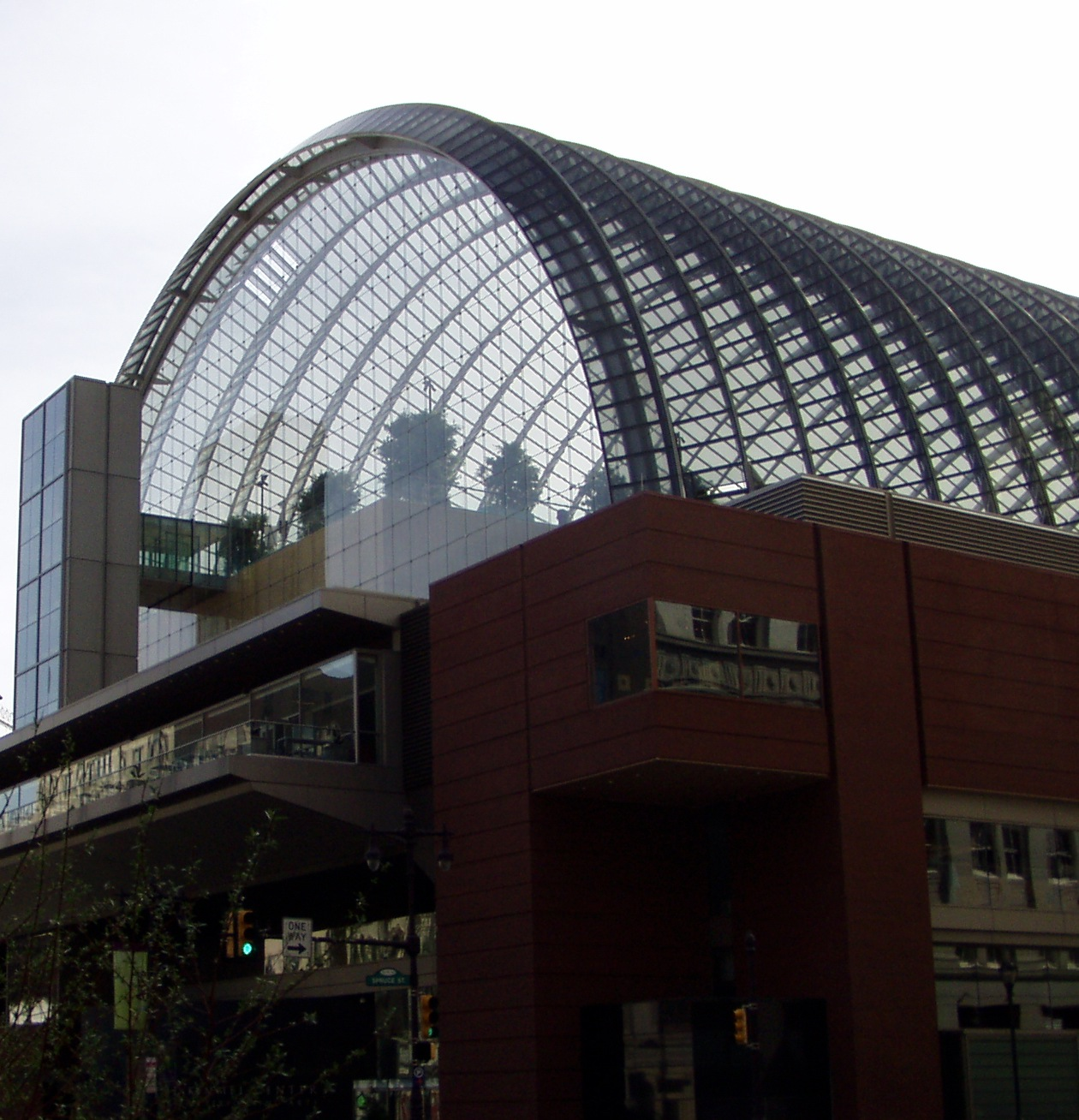
Kimmel Center

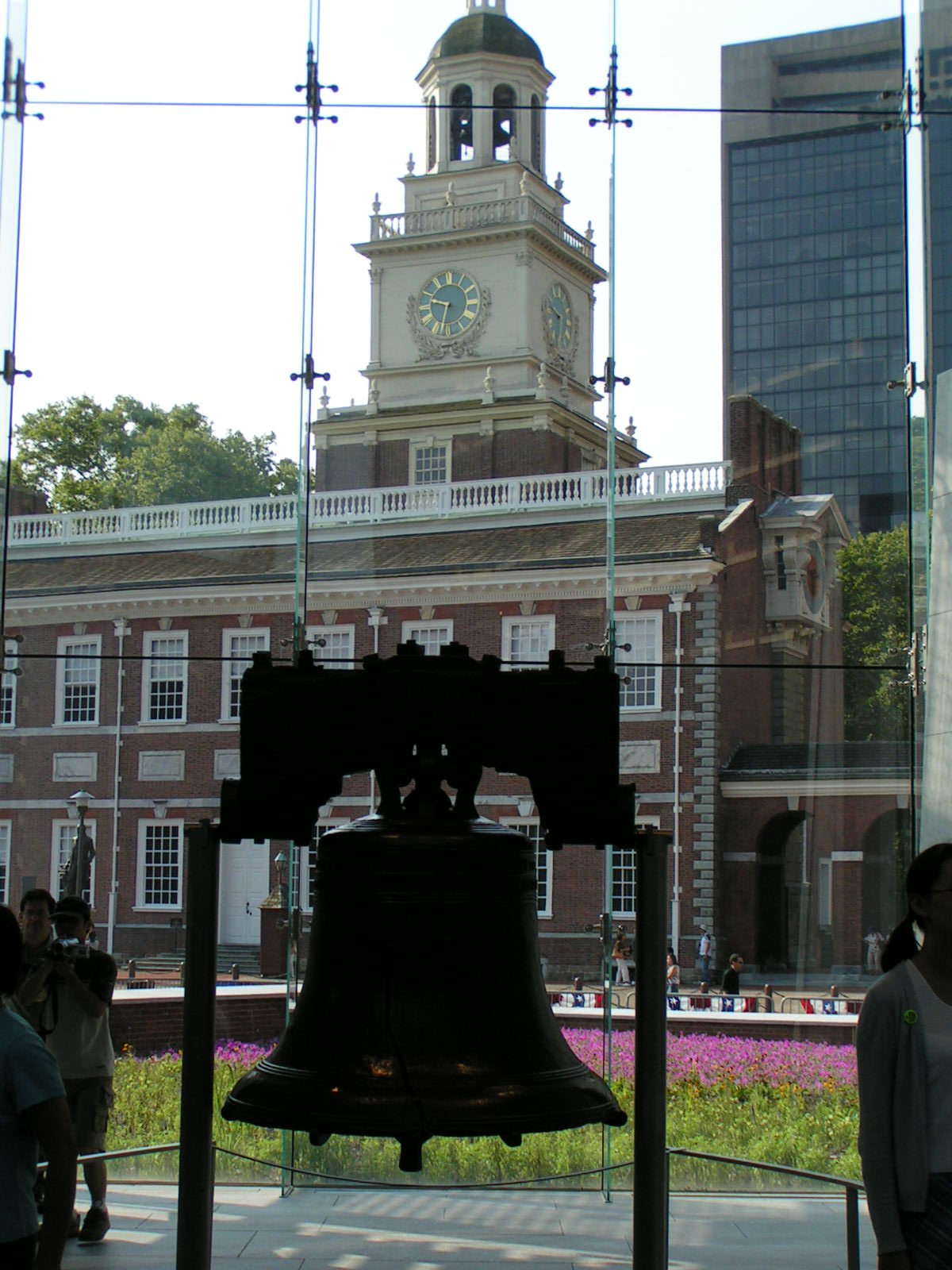
Independence Hall as seen from the Liberty Bell

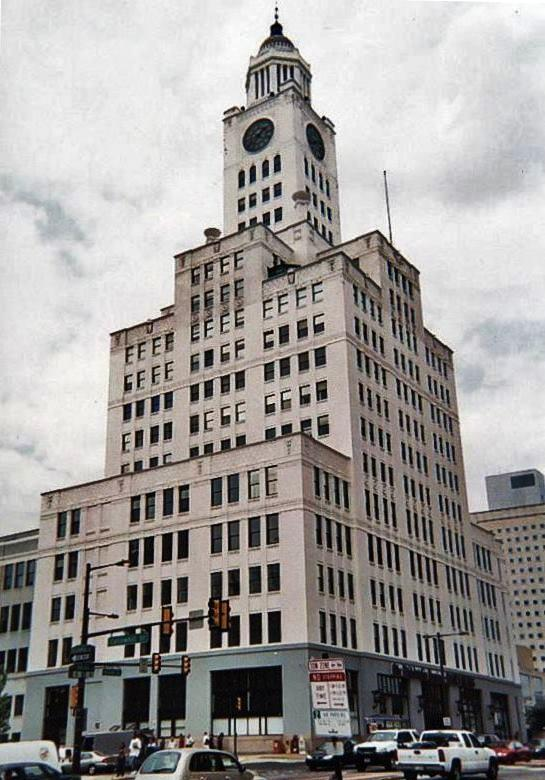
Inquirer Building

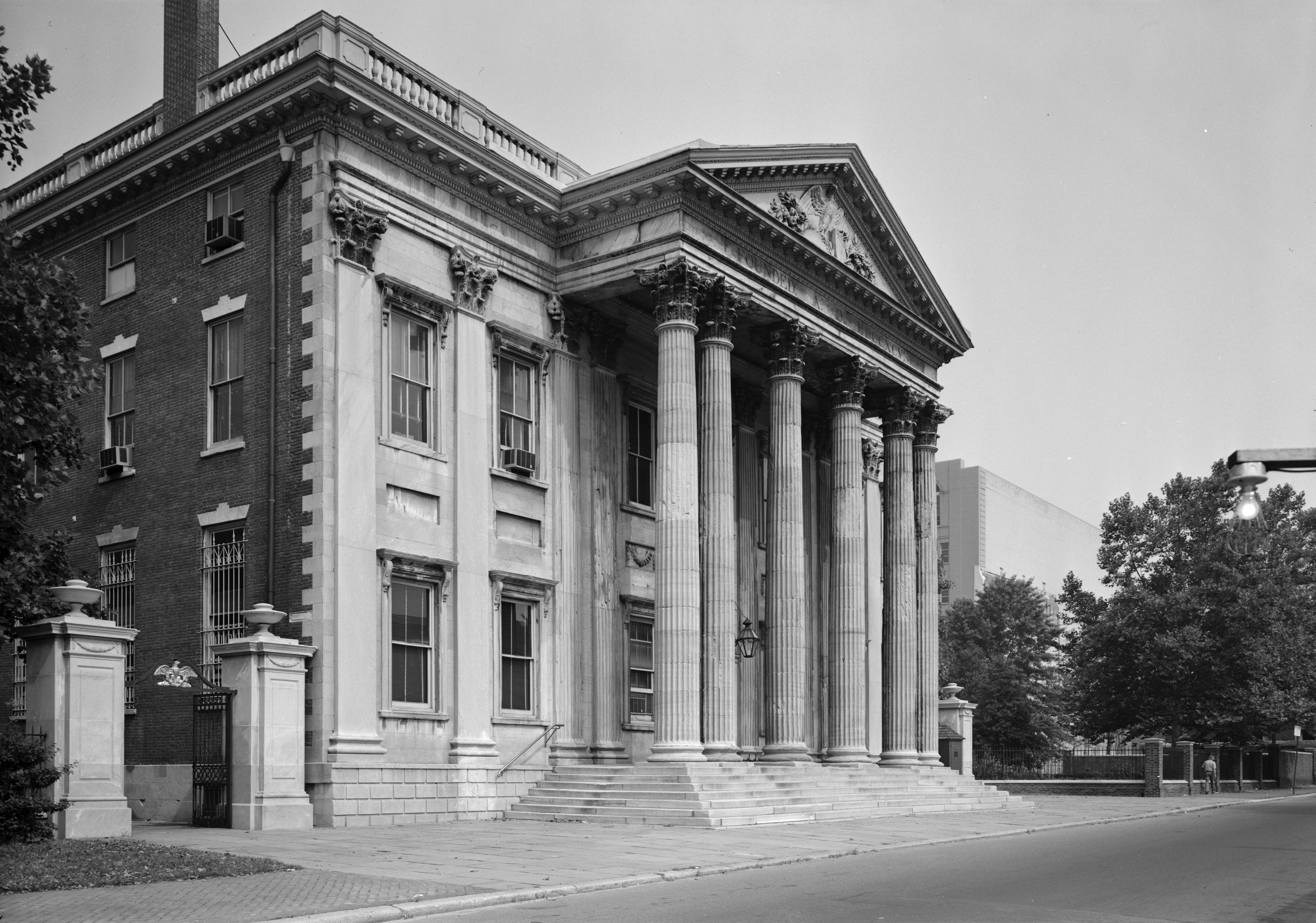
First Bank of the United States

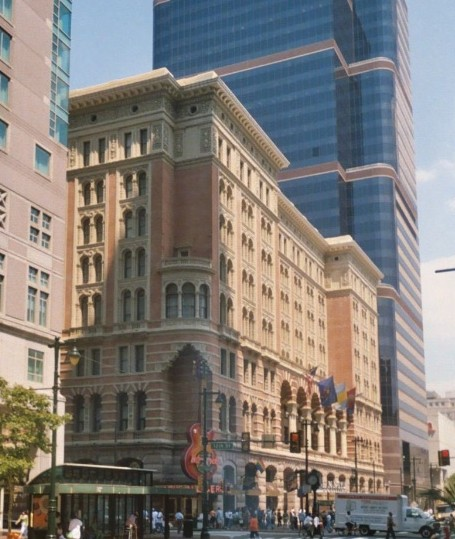
Reading Terminal

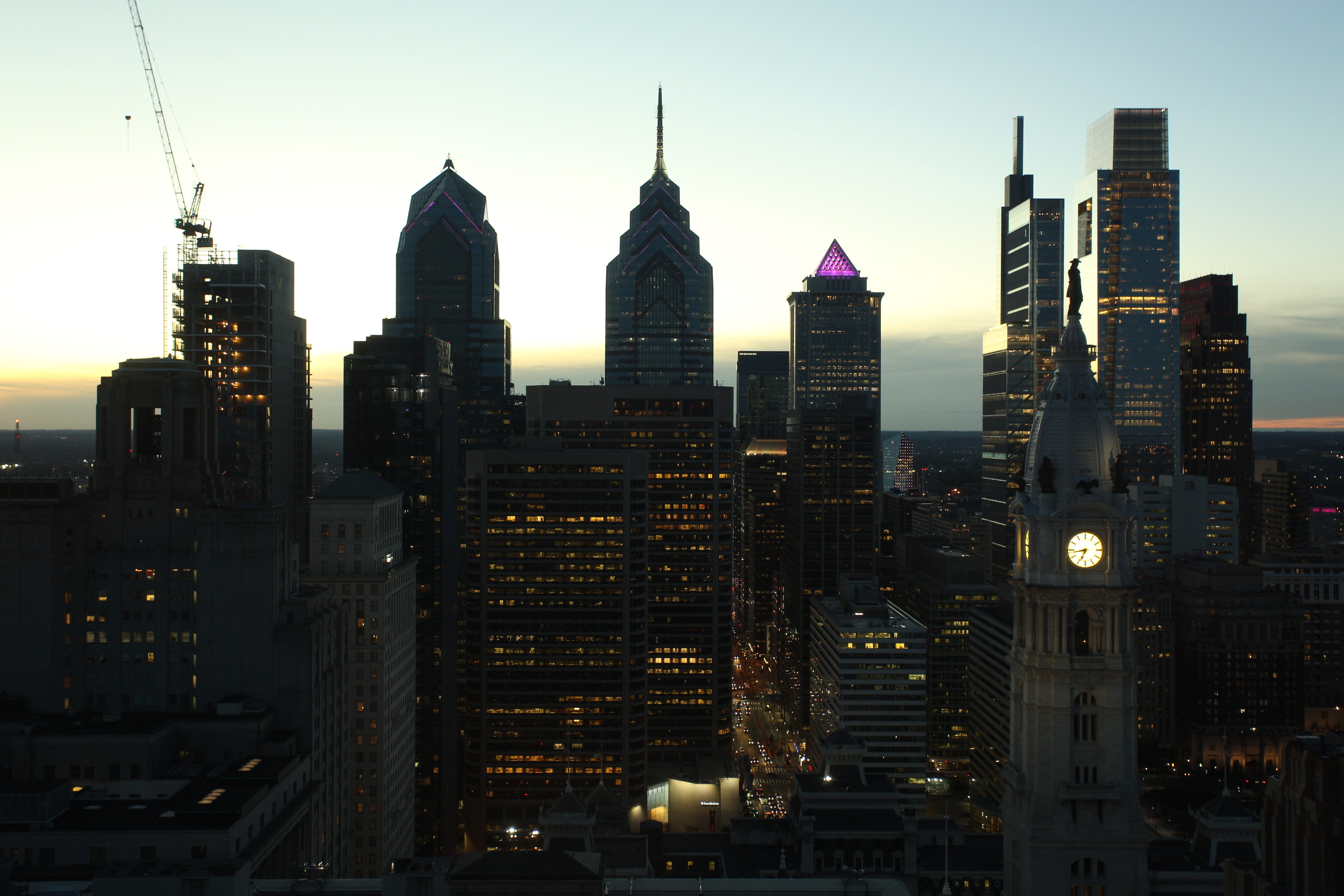
Center City viewed from the PSFS Building

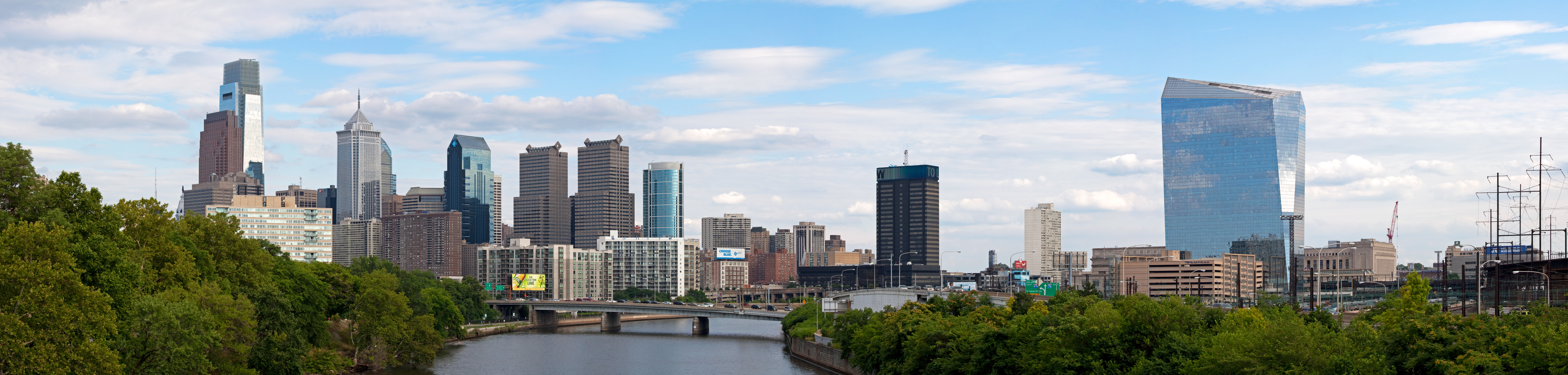
A panoramic view of Center City skyline from the northwest

== See also ==
- Curtis Publishing Company
- Independence National Historical Park
- National Register of Historic Places listings in Center City, Philadelphia
