= Science Leadership Academy =

Coordinates: 39.9558°N 75.1761°W

- 1482 Green St. Philadelphia, Pennsylvania; 19130; United States

Information
- Type: Public
- Motto: Learn, Create, Lead
- Established: 2006
- School district: School District of Philadelphia
- Principal: Chris Lehmann and Kelly Schaaf
- Grades: 9–12
- Enrollment: 506
- Campus size: Small
- Campus type: Urban
- Colors: Blue & Black
- Athletics: Baseball, Softball, Boys and Girls Basketball, Girls Volleyball, Boys and Girls Cross Country, Boys and Girls Soccer, Boys and Girls Track, Boys and Girls Ultimate, Cheerleading
- Mascot: Rockets
- Website: Official website

Science Leadership Academy is a magnet public high school in Philadelphia, Pennsylvania, which opened in September 2006. SLA is a partnership between The Franklin Institute and the School District of Philadelphia. SLA is also a 1:1 project-based laptop school where all students and teachers use laptops as their primary learning tool.

== History ==
Science Leadership Academy was created by the board of the Franklin Institute and founding principal, Christopher Lehmann.

In Spring 2009, SLA was named an Apple Distinguished School, by then one of only 34 schools in the nation named as such. In addition, SLA was featured in the April 2007 Edutopia Magazine article, "My School, Meet MySpace" where the school is called "… [John] Dewey for the digital age, old-fashioned progressive education with a technological twist."

The school has received speeches from a number of distinguished individuals over the years, including Bill Gates, Chairman of Microsoft and co-chair of the Bill and Melinda Gates Foundation, who spoke to the students of SLA on Thursday, April 29, 2010 and Steven Squyres, lead researcher on the Mars Land-Rover project who first visited the school in 2007 and was SLA's keynote speaker at their first graduation on June 15, 2010.

In a September 2010 issue of Ladies Home Journal, SLA was named one of ten in "America's Most Amazing Schools".

In October 2010, Apple.com published a case study of SLA on their Education web page.

In March 2011, SLA was featured in the PBS documentary Digital Media: New Learners for the 21st Century.

In March 2012, Apple.com featured SLA in their video about iBooks and iBooksAuthor.

In June 2012, President Barack Obama came to the Franklin Institute. He was there to congratulate the graduating seniors of Science Leadership Academy. The president said, "My expectation is that somebody in this auditorium is going to figure out new sources of energy that help not only make us more energy independent but also deals with the problems like climate change. There is somebody in this room who is going to make sure that we are defeating diseases like Alzheimer's or find a cure for cancer."

Dell has recognized the school as the Dell Center of Excellence for Learning since 2014.

== School features ==
The school's academic model is built around its five core values of inquiry, research, collaboration, presentation and reflection.

Each student of SLA, (along with the teachers), receives their own laptop. The majority of school work is done on the computers through the school's Canvas course-management system. The school has large lab areas, combining both a usual SLA classroom along with the lab areas, allowing students to conduct experiments regularly.

== Building ==
The location of the school building was decided upon its proximity to the Franklin Institute, as well as being in the heart of Downtown Philadelphia. The building itself was formerly an office building (for the Human Resources department of the School District of Philadelphia), which was renovated for SLA. The building has five stories.

In September 2019, Science Leadership Academy was supposed to move into its new building at 1482 Green St, Philadelphia, PA sharing a building with Benjamin Franklin High School, however the construction was not finished, and both schools had to be relocated for several months causing a major disruption. The schools moved back into the building in February 2020, and both schools are now located in the Broad and Spring Garden Sts. campus.

== Science Leadership Academy @ Beeber ==
On September 9, 2013, the school opened a second campus in the Wynnefield area of Philadelphia and graduated its first class in June 2017. SLA@Beeber originally shared a building with Beeber Middle School. After delaying a closure decision in 2013, the Philadelphia School Reform Commission recommended in 2015 that Beeber Middle School be phased out over a two-year period. SLA@Beeber is now the only occupant of the building, which is listed on the National Register of Historic Places for its significance to educational architecture. In the 2018-2019 school year, the school welcomed its first fifth grade class. The school's founding principal is Christopher Johnson. They have created many new partnerships with places such as PAFA and St. Joseph's University.

== Science Leadership Academy Middle School ==
On September 7, 2016, the third campus of Science Leadership Acabamy - Science Leadership Academy Middle School opened in the Powelton Village neighborhood of Philadelphia. The school (SLA-MS) opened with a 5th grade and will grow a grade until it houses a 5th through 8th grade. The founding principal is Timothy Boyle and the school was housed in the Dornsife Center on 35th and Spring Garden Sts. as part of their partnership with Drexel University for its first two years, and then moved into the 3600 Market St. building before moving into its permanent location on 36th and Warren Sts. in Winter 2021.

== See also ==
- The Franklin Institute
