= B'rith Sholom =

Independent Order Brith Sholom
- Founded: 1905; 121 years ago
- Location: Philadelphia, Pennsylvania

The Independent Order Brith Sholom (Hebrew: "Covenant of Peace") is a Jewish fraternal organization, founded in 1905 and headquartered in Philadelphia, Pennsylvania. According to the Jewish Communal Register of New York City, 1917-1918, in that year, Brith Sholom had 378 lodges nationwide that included 52,596 members, and had 88 lodges in New York City alone, including 15,000 members. The average annual cost to members was $16.

In 1940, its membership numbered 15,000.

An active chapter still exists in Cherry Hill, NJ https://www.chbs966.com

== Bibliography ==
- Schmidt, Alvin J. and Babchuk, Nicolas. Fraternal Organizations. Published 1980. Greenwood Press. Friendly societies. 410 pages. ISBN 0-313-21436-0
- Oscar Isaiah Janowsky. The American Jew: A Composite Portrait, p. 146
