= B (SEPTA) =

Subway line in Philadelphia, Pennsylvania

Broad Street Line

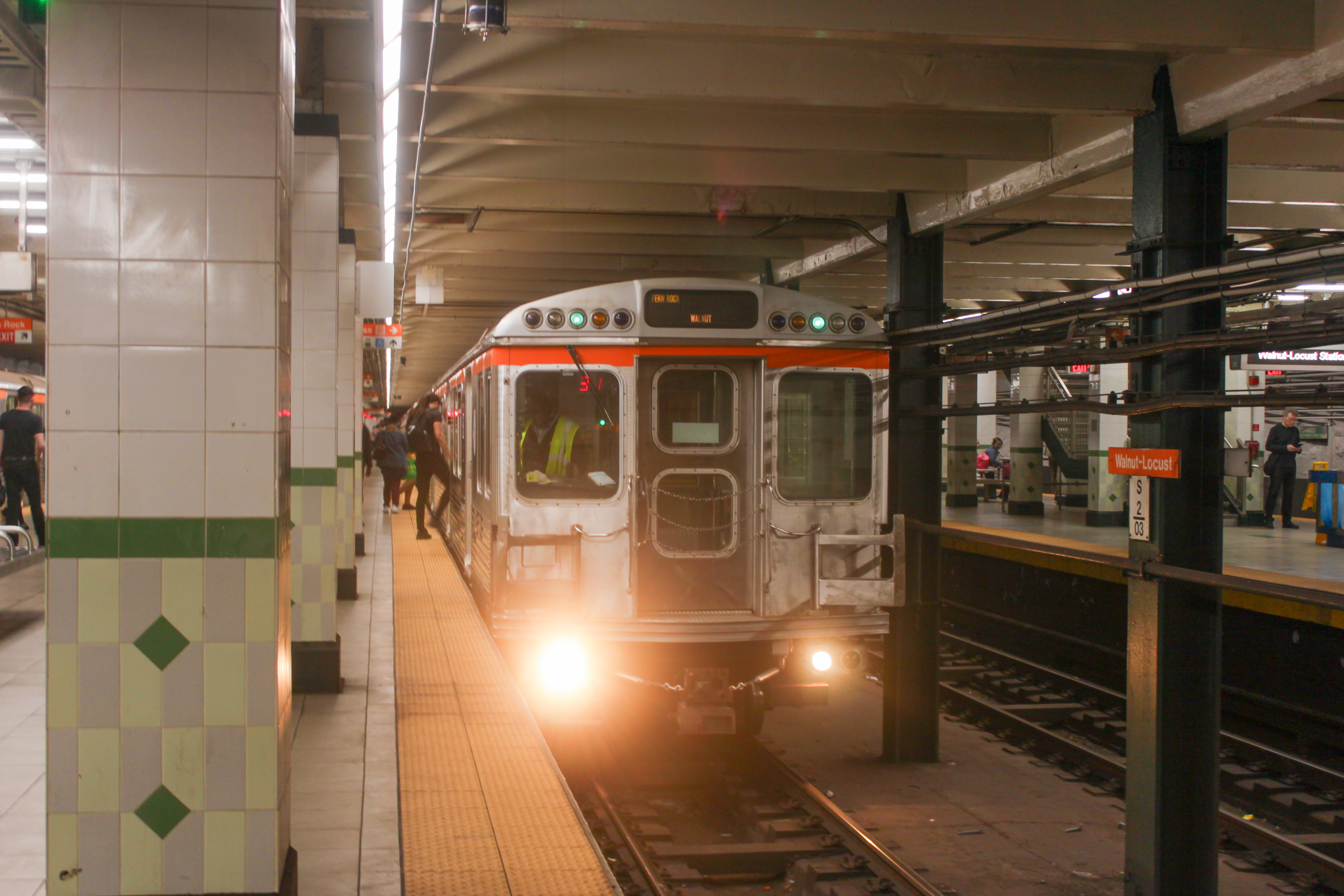
- An express train at Walnut–Locust station in 2024

Overview
- Status: Operational
- Owner: City of Philadelphia
- Locale: Philadelphia, Pennsylvania, U.S.
- Termini: NRG Station; Walnut–Locust; 8th–Market; Fern Rock T.C.; Olney T.C. (weekdays, partial)
- Stations: 24
- Website: www.septa.org/schedules/B

Service
- Type: Rapid transit
- System: SEPTA Metro
- Services: Local; Express; Spur
- Operator(s): 1928–39: Philadelphia Rapid Transit Co. 1940–68: Philadelphia Transportation Co. 1968–present: SEPTA
- Depot: Fern Rock Transit Center
- Rolling stock: Kawasaki B-IV Subway trains
- Daily ridership: 82,568 (FY 2025)

History
- Opened: September 1, 1928
- Last extension: April 8, 1973

Technical
- Line length: 12.5 mi (20.1 km)
- Num of tracks: 2–4
- Character: Underground and surface
- Track gauge: 4 ft 8 1/2 in (1,435 mm) standard gauge
- Electrification: Third rail, 600 V DC
Route map
Template:B (SEPTA)

The B, (Note: Conventions for line names state they are to be referred to by letter only (i.e. "the B", not "the B line")) also known as the Broad Street Line, formerly abbreviated as the BSL, (Note: Also known as the Broad Street Subway or the Orange Line) is a rapid transit line in the SEPTA Metro network in Philadelphia, Pennsylvania, United States. The line runs primarily north–south under Broad Street from the Fern Rock Transit Center in North Philadelphia through Center City Philadelphia to NRG Station at Pattison Avenue in South Philadelphia. The Ridge spur follows Ridge Avenue between Fairmount Avenue and Market Street.

The line, which is entirely underground except for the northern terminus at Fern Rock, has four tracks in a local/express configuration from Fern Rock to Walnut–Locust and two tracks in the southern portion. With about 115,000 boardings on an average weekday in 2019, it is the second-busiest route in the SEPTA system.

== Route and services ==
The B runs in the Broad Street Subway, which runs north–south under Broad Street between NRG Station at Pattison Avenue in South Philadelphia and Olney Transit Center at Olney Avenue in Logan. North of Olney Avenue, the line curves east to Fern Rock Transit Center, the only surface-level station on the line. Between Lombard–South station and just west of Fern Rock, the subway is quadrupled-tracked with inner express tracks and outer local tracks. Express stations have two island platforms serving all four tracks, while local stations have two side platforms serving only the outer tracks. South of Walnut-Locust and at Fern Rock, the line has two tracks and single island platforms. The two-track Broad–Ridge Spur splits from the Broad Street Subway at Fairmount station and runs southeast under Ridge Avenue and 8th Street to 8th Street station.

The B has three services:

- B1 service operates local between Fern Rock and NRG Station serving all 22 stops. It operates daily between approximately 5:00 am and midnight, with replacement bus service operating during overnight hours. B1 service, including bus service, operates every 15 minutes or better at all times except during the first and last hours of rail service on weekends. On weekdays, service operates every 8 minutes or better between 7:00 am and 6:00 pm. Scheduled running time is about 40 minutes.
- B2 service operates express between Fern Rock and Walnut–Locust station, serving only eight stops. It operates only on weekdays from approximately 6:00–10:00 am and 2:00–6:00 pm. B2 service operates every 15 minutes or better during these times, with service every seven minutes or better at peak hours. Scheduled running time is about 20 minutes. B2 Special service is operated to serve events at the South Philadelphia Sports Complex; it makes no stops between Walnut-Locust and NRG.
- B3 service operates between Olney and 8th Street serving eight stops. It operates express in the Broad Street Subway and provides all Ridge Spur service. B3 service operates Monday–Saturday from approximately 6:00 am to 9:00 pm. Saturday service and a small number of weekday trains terminate at Fern Rock. Headways vary from every seven minutes at weekday peak hours to every 20 minutes on Saturdays. Scheduled running time is about 16–19 minutes.

== History ==
=== Construction ===
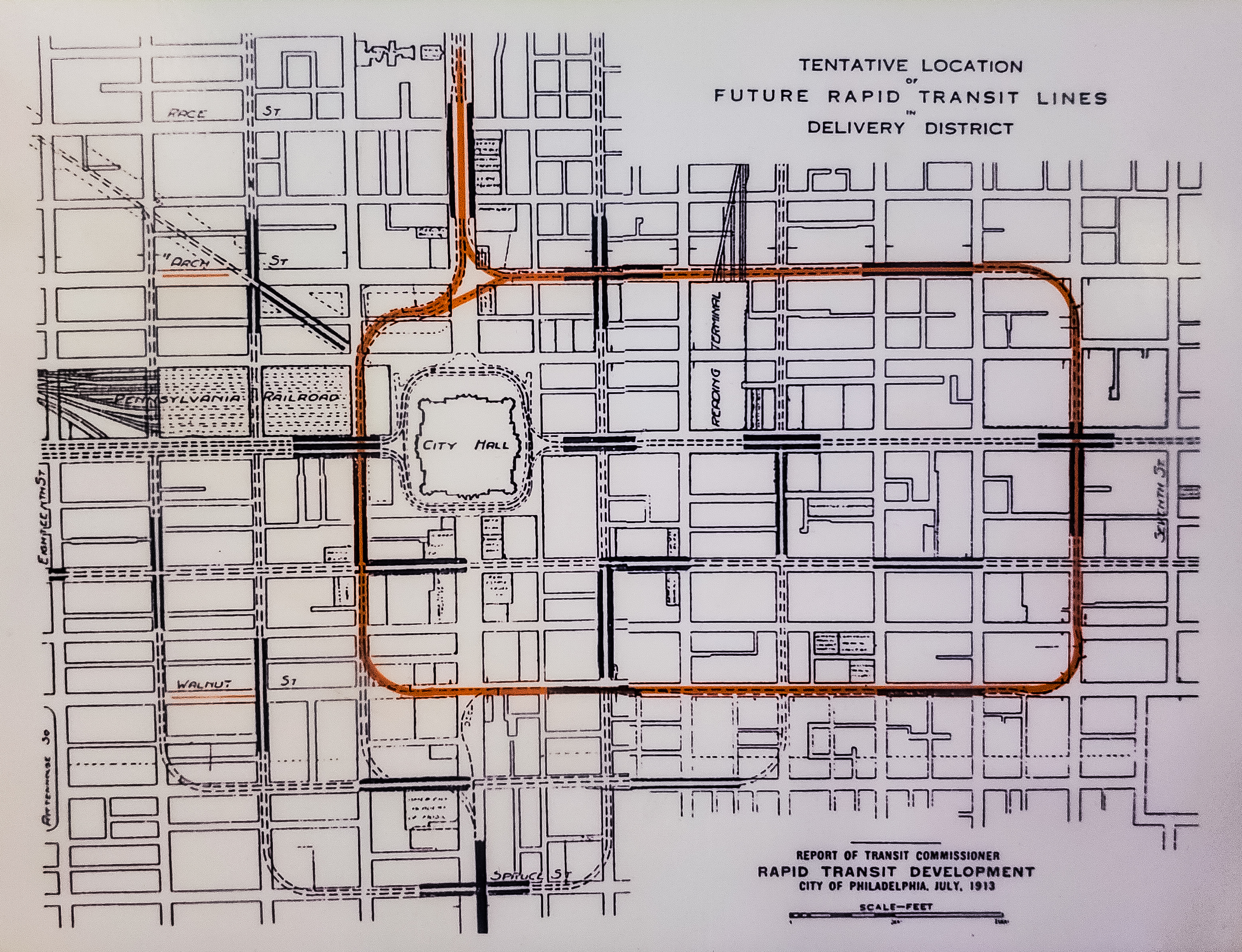
The proposed Center City distribution loop of the Broad Street Line from the 1913 rapid transit development plan utilizing Arch Street, 8th Street, and Walnut Street.

Service on the northern half of the B, between City Hall and Olney Avenue, opened on September 1, 1928. While the original subway tunnel had been finished to just north of the present-day Lombard-South station, service to the Walnut–Locust station did not begin until 1930, and the Lombard-South station entered service in 1932. Service from that point south to Snyder Avenue began on September 18, 1938. Service to a new park-and-ride station built next to the Fern Rock shops began in 1956, and the line was extended further south to Pattison Avenue in 1973 to serve the recently completed Sports Complex.

Although the Broad Street subway was originally planned in the 1920s to be a 4-track facility for its entire length (Fern Rock portal to Snyder), the tunnel was built with provision for 4 tracks only from the portal to just north of Lombard-South. At the time of opening, the outer 2 tracks were built along this length, whereas the inner 2 express tracks were built only in two sections, from the Fern Rock portal/shops to just south of Olney, and from Girard to their terminus just north of Lombard South. To close the gaps, the two inner express tracks were laid from Erie to Girard in 1959, and again from Olney to Erie in 1991.

From Lombard-South station south to Snyder, the tunnel was constructed differently – only the eastern half of the line was built. The track currently used for southbound trains is actually the northbound express track. The extension in 1973 to Pattison station (now called NRG Station) continued this arrangement. Space exists under the western half of Broad Street for the construction of the western half of the tunnel, which would include the remaining 2 tracks and additional island platforms for southbound local and express trains. The resulting infrastructure would match the configuration built in the northern half of the line.

Provisions for flying junctions exist in the tunnels at three locations: north of Olney station, north of Erie station, and between Tasker-Morris and Snyder stations. These were to connect to planned but never built extensions to the north, northeast, northwest and southwest. Tracks were laid in the upper levels of the flying junctions north of Olney and Erie; these have been used over the years to store out-of-service trains and as layover points for express and Ridge Spur trains. The NRG Station contains a lower-level platform (very narrow compared to the very wide upper-level platform), built to accommodate additional trains for large crowds at sporting events. Seldom used for passenger service in recent years, these tracks are most often used to store rolling stock and work trains.

The line and its trains were leased to SEPTA in 1968 after it assumed operation of the city transit systems from the former Philadelphia Transportation Company (PTC). The line ran 24 hours a day until 1991. Overnight service was reinstated on June 20, 2014, for Friday and Saturday nights only on a trial basis. It was made permanent on October 8, 2014.

==== The Ridge Avenue, West Philadelphia, and Delaware River Bridge subways ====
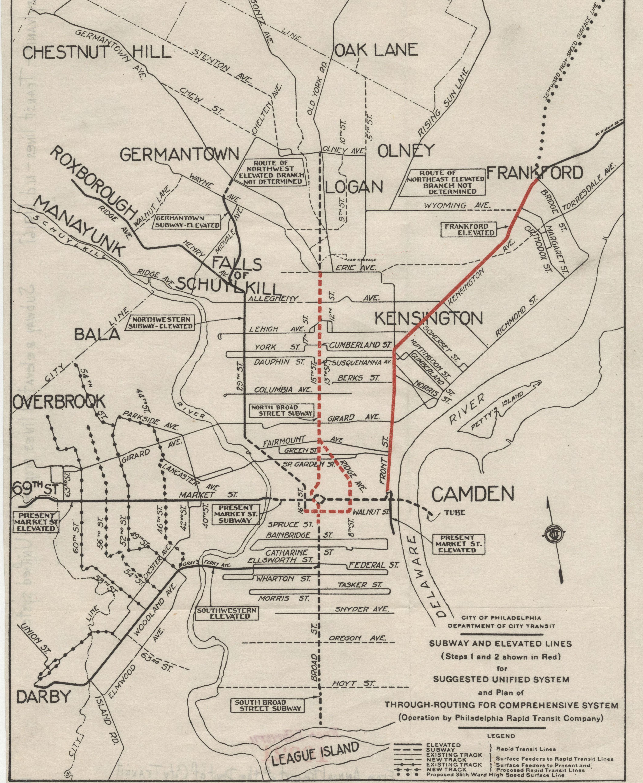
1916 map of Twining's primary plan

In 1916, William S. Twining, the director of the Department of City Transit, first proposed the Ridge Avenue subway as a replacement for the Center City distribution loop. This replacement would run directly to 8th & Market Streets via Ridge Avenue, skipping the longer alignment via Broad and Arch Streets. From 8th & Market, the subway would continue south, then turn west under Walnut Street, then back north under 16th Street, linking to the also-proposed subway under the Benjamin Franklin Parkway. This proposal also involved a branch line from Broad and Federal Streets in South Philadelphia (present-day location of Ellsworth-Federal station) to Darby, following Federal Street, Grays Ferry Avenue, and Woodland Avenue.

Twining also pursued a version of the Broad Street Subway that directly competed with the Philadelphia Rapid Transit Company and would be built in the event that the City of Philadelphia and PRTC could not come to an operating agreement for the primary, unified system. Instead of funneling into the Parkway subway, the Ridge Avenue subway would continue westward through Center City to West Philadelphia, following the Northeast Corridor right-of-way to Woodland Avenue before turning southwest. The Federal Street branch of the South Broad Street subway would not be built under this plan. This altered version of the Ridge Avenue subway was officially authorized by the City in November 1923, with the routing tweaked in West Philadelphia to continue under Chestnut and 42nd Streets to reach Woodland Avenue instead of following the Northeast Corridor.

Plans for the West Philadelphia subway extension were further tweaked in 1930, with the Walnut Street segment being shifted one block south to Locust Street. Shuttle service on the Ridge Avenue subway between Girard station and Market Street then began on December 21, 1932. As part of that project, a tunnel shell running south under 8th Street, then west under Locust Street to 18th Street was completed in 1933, but not yet outfitted for service. The Department of City Transit would revisit the still-authorized plan on numerous occasions over the following twenty years, most notably in the early 1940s and 1960s, but no construction ever materialized.

Due to the Delaware River Bridge being open and the Ridge Avenue subway being in progress, the City rushed to modify the 1923 plans for subway service between Center City and Camden. Rather than feeding into the authorized, but unfunded subway under Filbert Street and the Benjamin Franklin Parkway, rail service over the bridge would link to the Ridge-8th Street branch just south of Chinatown station (then Race-Vine). The contract for the Ridge-Woodland subway was changed to accommodate this change, adding a flying junction at 8th and Race streets. The service, eventually christened the Bridge Line, began operation on June 7, 1936 as a shuttle between central Philadelphia and Camden.

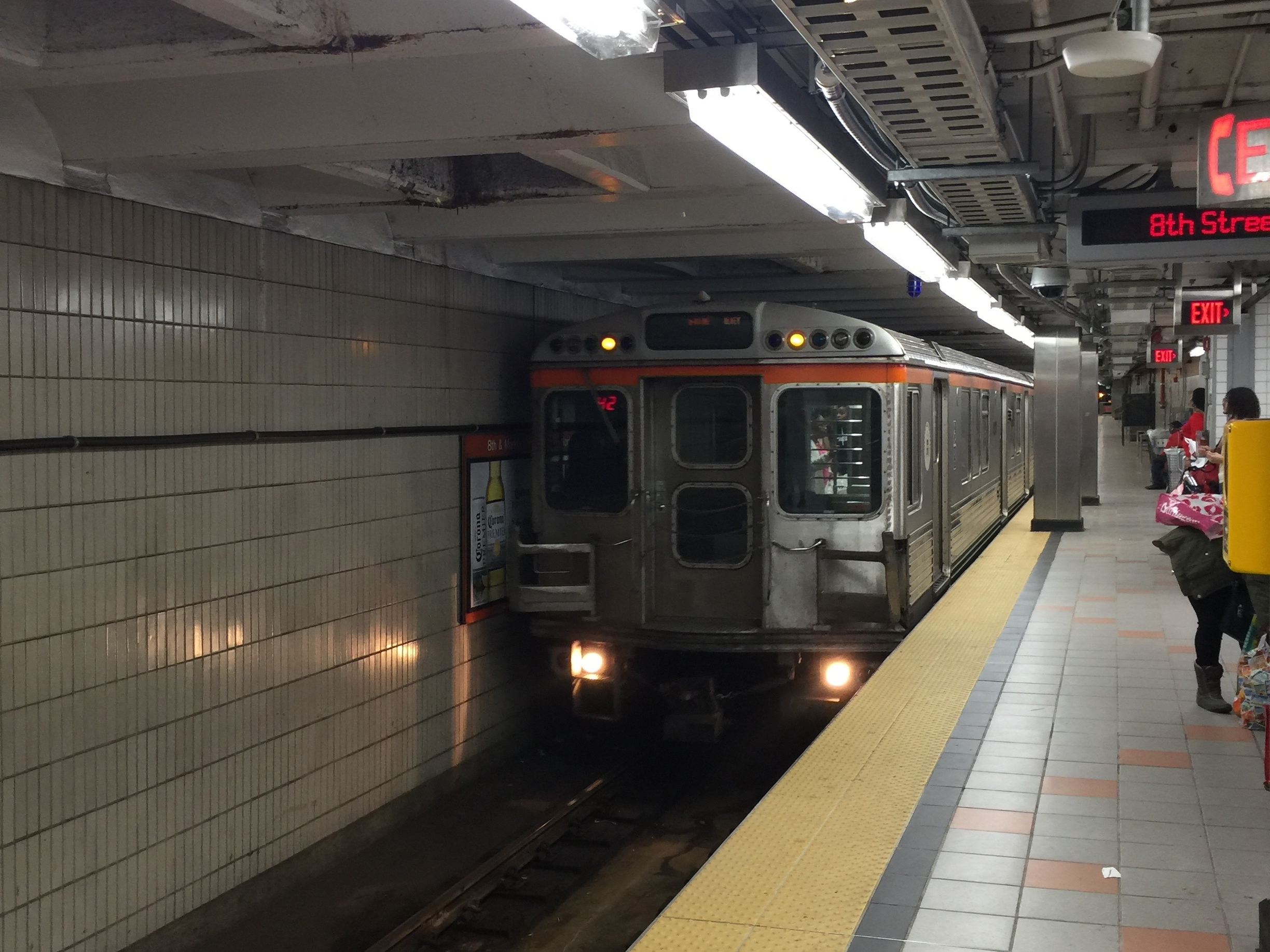
Broad–Ridge Spur train at 8th and Market

Beginning in June 1949, Ridge Spur and Bridge Line trains were through-routed at 8th and Market. The partially-built Locust Street tunnel was opened on February 15, 1953; Bridge Line trains were extended to a new terminus at 15th–16th Street station with two intermediate stops, while Ridge Spur trains reverted to running between 8th & Market and Girard. In January 1954, due to low ridership, off-peak service and Saturday again began operating between Girard and Camden, with a shuttle train operating between the Market Street and 15th–16th Street stations. Sunday service was suspended at that time due to minimal usage. Ridge Spur service was suspended from August 23 to 27, 1968 as its tracks were switched to a new upper-level terminal platform at 8th Street station to allow conversion of the 8th–Locust Street subway into the Lindenwold High-Speed Line (PATCO Speedline).

The Ridge Spur was closed again from February 1981 to September 6, 1983, during construction of the Center City Commuter Connection. Spring Garden station, by then exit-only, was closed on September 10, 1989, due to safety concerns. Never drawing high ridership, the Spur has been proposed for closure on several occasions. The 2014 closure of the Gallery Mall, adjacent to 8th Street station, caused ridership on the Spur to drop by 25%.

=== 21st century ===
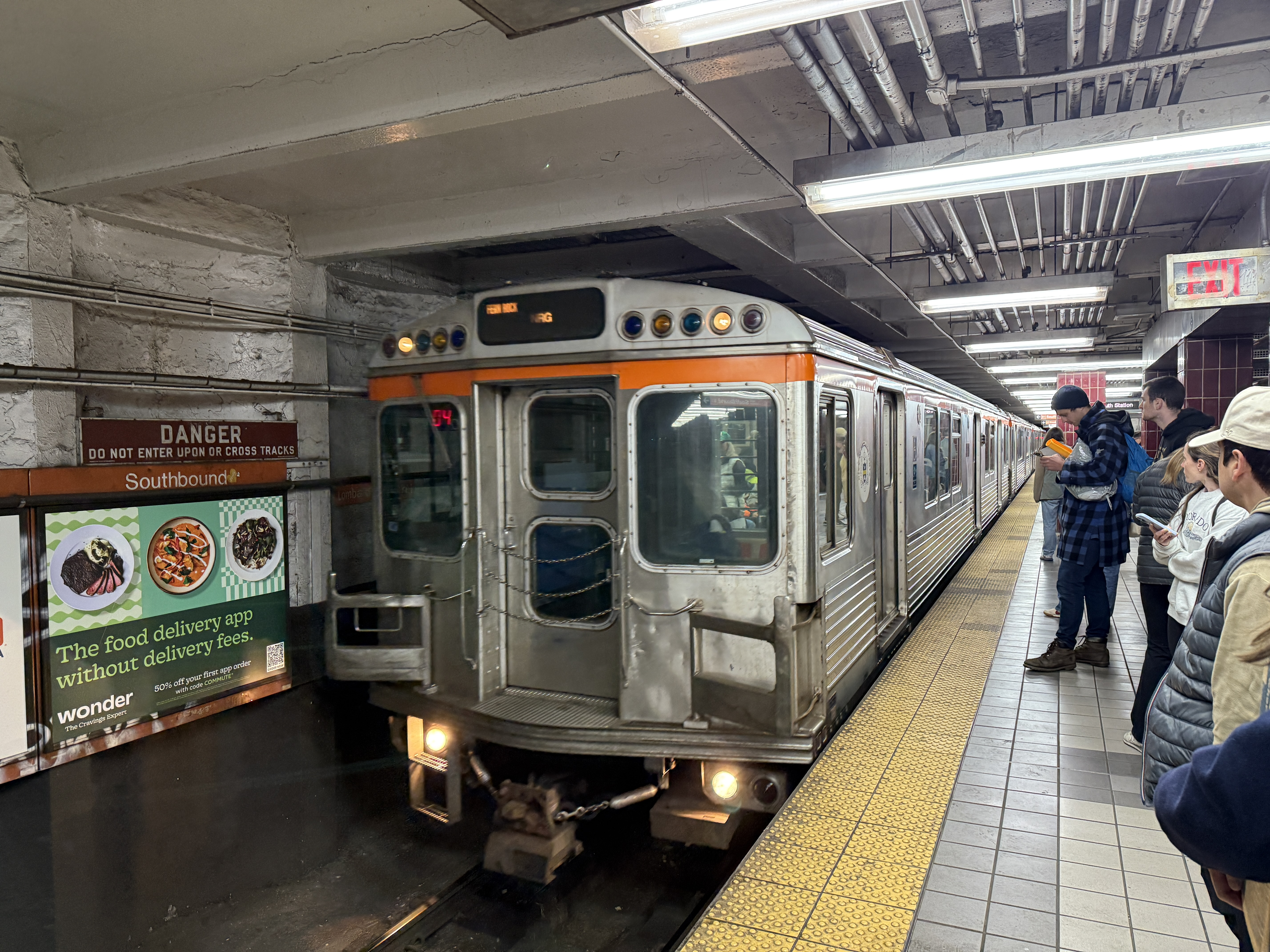
A B1 train bound for NRG Station arrives at Lombard–South station

During early 2020, the line operated "Lifeline Service" due to the COVID-19 pandemic in Pennsylvania. From April 2020, trains bypassed the Logan, Wyoming, Susquehanna–Dauphin, Fairmount, Spring Garden, Chinatown, Lombard–South, and Tasker–Morris stations. Overnight service was replaced by buses. All stations were reopened by July 2020. Overnight service was indefinitely replaced by buses in October 2020.

In September 2021, SEPTA proposed updating its wayfinding across the bus, subway, and trolley networks, rebranding their rail transit service as "SEPTA Metro". Under the proposal, services along the Broad Street Line would be rebranded as the "B" Lines, retaining their orange color. Each service utilizing the trunk would receive a numeric suffix. Local service would be known as the B1 Broad Street Local, the express and special service as the B2 Broad Street Express and B2 Express Sport Special, and the Broad–Ridge Spur as the B3 Broad–Ridge Express.

Following public feedback, SEPTA revised the Wayfinding Master Plan. Rather than being referred to as the B Lines, the Broad Street line become the "B". Local service became simply the "B1", express and special services the "B2", and the Broad–Ridge Spur the "B3", with signage letting riders know whether a train terminates at Walnut–Locust or NRG Station. Additionally, SEPTA stated they would pilot neighborhood maps in stations and prioritize the deployment of real-time information signage and on mobile apps. The Broad Street Line was officially renamed as the B on February 24, 2025.

=== Proposed extensions ===
==== Roosevelt Boulevard ====
Both the City of Philadelphia and SEPTA have studied extending the B along Roosevelt Boulevard, in order to serve a growing population in the northeast section of the city. The city government's archives contain a survey report, prepared in 1948, discussing a need for an extension of the B from Erie Avenue to the vicinity of Pennypack Circle (see Roosevelt Boulevard). Subway car destination signage even included station and terminus names for major streets along Roosevelt Boulevard such as Rhawn Street, in the newer "South Broad" cars. An expansion into another part of the city could better use the capacity of the four-track trunk line.

In 1964, the city proposed a nine-mile (14 km), $94 million extension of the then-Broad Street line along Roosevelt Blvd. in conjunction with a new Northeast Expressway to be built by the Pennsylvania Department of Transportation. Development was limited to the building of one subway station by Sears, Roebuck and Company in 1967, at its complex on Roosevelt Boulevard at Adams Avenue, at the cost of $1 million, in anticipation of future service. This station was destroyed when the facility was demolished in October 1994. Ultimately the Northeast Expressway was never built, due to lack of funds, and the subway extension remained a paper concept.

On September 10, 1999, SEPTA filed a Notice of Intent to prepare an Environmental Impact Statement for the Northeast Extension with the EPA. In December 2001, the Philadelphia City Planning Commission supported extending the then-Broad Street Line along Roosevelt Blvd. to Bustleton Avenue, where it would be joined by the then-Market–Frankford Line (L), extended from its Frankford terminal (now the rebuilt Frankford Transit Center). The estimated cost had increased to $3.4 billion.

==== Philadelphia Naval Yard ====
Currently, the B terminates southbound at NRG Station at Pattison Avenue and three major stadiums. With the redevelopment of the Philadelphia Naval Yard directly to the south, a Health Impact Assessment report was issued in March 2012 to determine if extending the line to the Naval Yard would be a viable option for commuters. It determined that extending the line to the Naval Yard would more than halve the number of private cars commuting back and forth, with the remainder taking the proposed subway line and/or using a bicycle sidepath. The HIA recommends making an extension of the B a priority, and recently, the extension has garnered much support.

A March 2019 study, created by HNTB for the Pennsylvania Department of Transportation and SEPTA, analyzed three potential alignments of extensions to the Navy Yard, as well as improved bus service. It recommended against pursuing federal funding for the project, as none of the subway alignments obtained the necessary rating to seek Federal Transit Administration funding due to low potential ridership. The report also recommended that more development at the Navy Yard, including housing, would boost ridership projections.

== Rolling stock ==
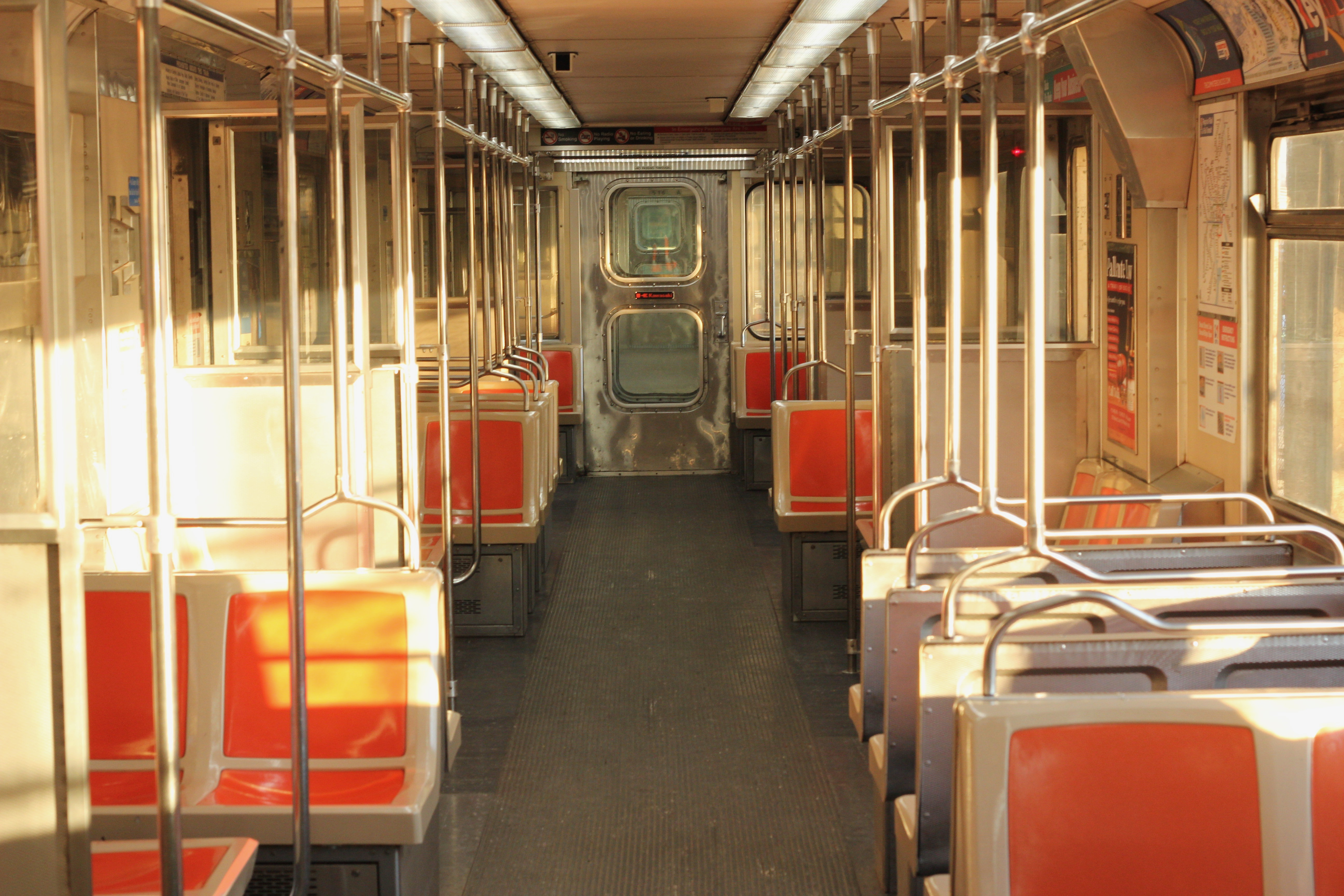
Interior of a Broad Street Line train

The B uses a fleet of 125 "B-IV" cars built by Kawasaki in 1982. Maximum speed in regular service is 55 miles per hour (89 km/h). The cars are 67 feet 6 inches (20.57 m) long, 10 feet 1.5 inches (3.086 m) wide, and 12 feet 3 inches (3.73 m) tall.

The original rolling stock for the Broad Street Subway was the B-1 cars built in 1926–27 by the J.G. Brill Company. The B-2 cars were built by Pressed Steel Car Company in 1938. From 1969 to 1984, former Bridge Line cars, built by Brill in 1936, were used on the line and designated B-3.

=== Preservation ===
- A small number of B-1, B-2, and B-3 historic cars remain stored in derelict condition within Fern Rock yard.
- One B-1 car was sold and sent to the Trackside Brick Oven Pizzeria in Wallingford, Connecticut.
- One B-1 car (#55) is present at the Illinois Railway Museum.
- One B-3 car (#1009) is partially restored at the Rockhill Trolley Museum.
- Two B-3 cars (#1018, #1023) are at the Seashore Trolley Museum.

== Stations ==
All stations are located in the city of Philadelphia, Pennsylvania.

Neighborhood	Station				Connections	Weekday ridership (2018)	Notes
Fern Rock	Fern Rock T.C.	●	●	●	SEPTA Regional Rail: SEPTA City Bus: 4, 28, 57, 70	4,498	
Logan	Olney Transit Center	●	●	●	SEPTA City Bus: 6, 8, 16, 18, 22, 26, 51, 55	16,591	Serves Jefferson Einstein Hospital and La Salle University
Logan	Logan	●	│	│	SEPTA City Bus: 16, 41	2,452	
Logan	Wyoming	●	│	│	SEPTA City Bus: 16; SEPTA Trackless Trolley: 75	2,087	
Hunting Park	Hunting Park	●	│	│	SEPTA City Bus: 1, 16, 82	3,006	
Hunting Park	Erie	●	●	●	SEPTA City Bus: 16, 23, 53, 56, 71, 81	7,750	Serves Temple University Hospital
Glenwood	Broad–Allegheny	●	│	│	SEPTA City Bus: 4, 16, 60	3,842	Serves Kornberg School of Dentistry
Glenwood	North Philadelphia	●	│	●	Amtrak: Northeast and Keystone Corridor services (at North Philadelphia); SEPTA Regional Rail: (at North Philadelphia), (at North Broad); SEPTA City Bus: 4, 16, 54	4,168	
Cecil B. Moore	Susquehanna–Dauphin	●	│	│	SEPTA City Bus: 4, 16, 39	3,392	Originally named Dauphin-Susquehanna
Cecil B. Moore	Cecil B. Moore	●	│	│	SEPTA City Bus: 3, 4, 16	7,375	Serves Temple University; Originally named Columbia Avenue
Francisville	Broad–Girard	●	●	●	SEPTA Metro: SEPTA City Bus: 4, 16	4,009	
Francisville	Fairmount	●	│	●	SEPTA City Bus: 4, 16, 61	2,156	
Callowhill	Spring Garden	B3 only		│			Closed since 1989
Chinatown	Chinatown	B3 only		●	SEPTA City Bus: 47, 61 (all south); NJ Transit Bus: 317, 400, 401, 402, 404, 406, 408, 409, 410, 412, 551 (at Vine St & 8th St)	322	Originally named Vine
Market East	8th–Market	B3 only		●	SEPTA Metro: DRPA: PATCO; SEPTA City Bus: 17, 33, 38 (west), 44, 47 (south), 61; NJ Transit Bus: 313, 315, 316, 317, 400, 401, 402, 404, 406, 408, 409, 410, 412, 414, 417, 551, 555	2,254	Originally named Market Street
Chinatown	Broad–Spring Garden	●	●		SEPTA City Bus: 4, 16, 43	7,462	Serves the Community College of Philadelphia
Chinatown	Race–Vine	●	●		SEPTA City Bus: 4, 16, 27; NJ Transit Bus: 317, 400, 401, 402, 404, 406, 408, 409, 410, 412, 551	3,226	Serves the Pennsylvania Convention Center
Center City	15th Street/City Hall	●	●		SEPTA Regional Rail: all lines (at Suburban Station); SEPTA Metro: SEPTA City Bus: 4, 16, 17, 27, 31, 32, 33, 38, 44, 48; SEPTA Suburban Bus: 124, 125	30,506	Located in the Downtown Link concourse
Washington; Square West	Walnut–Locust	●	●		DRPA: PATCO (at 15–16th & Locust and 12–13th & Locust); SEPTA City Bus: 4, 9, 12, 16, 21, 27, 32, 38 (east), 42	7,633	Serves the Kimmel Center and Academy of Music
Washington; Square West	Lombard–South	●	│		SEPTA City Bus: 4, 27, 32, 40	2,915	Serves Peirce College, and Graduate Hospital
South; Philadelphia	Ellsworth–Federal	●	│		SEPTA City Bus: 4, 64	3,715	Serves the Italian Market
South; Philadelphia	Tasker–Morris	●	│		SEPTA City Bus: 4, 29	4,505	
South; Philadelphia	Snyder	●	│		SEPTA City Bus: 4, 37, 79	5,500	Serves Methodist Hospital
South; Philadelphia	Oregon	●	│		SEPTA City Bus: 4, 7, 45, 63, 68	4,045	Serves Marconi Plaza
South; Philadelphia	NRG Station	●	(Note: B2 Special only)		SEPTA City Bus: 4, 45, 68	1,541	Serves the South Philadelphia Sports Complex; Originally named Pattison and later AT&T
