= Federal Street =

Federal Street may refer to:

- Federal Street (Boston)
  - Federal Street Theatre
- Federal Street (Baltimore)
- Federal Street (Camden)
- Federal Street (Philadelphia)
  - Ellsworth–Federal station (formerly Federal Street Station)
- Federal Street (Portland, Maine)
- Federal Street Historic District, in Brunswick, Maine
- Federal Street District, in Salem, Massachusetts

== See also ==
- Federal Boulevard
- Federal Road (disambiguation)
