= Broad–Spring Garden station =

Rapid transit station in Philadelphia

Broad–Spring Garden
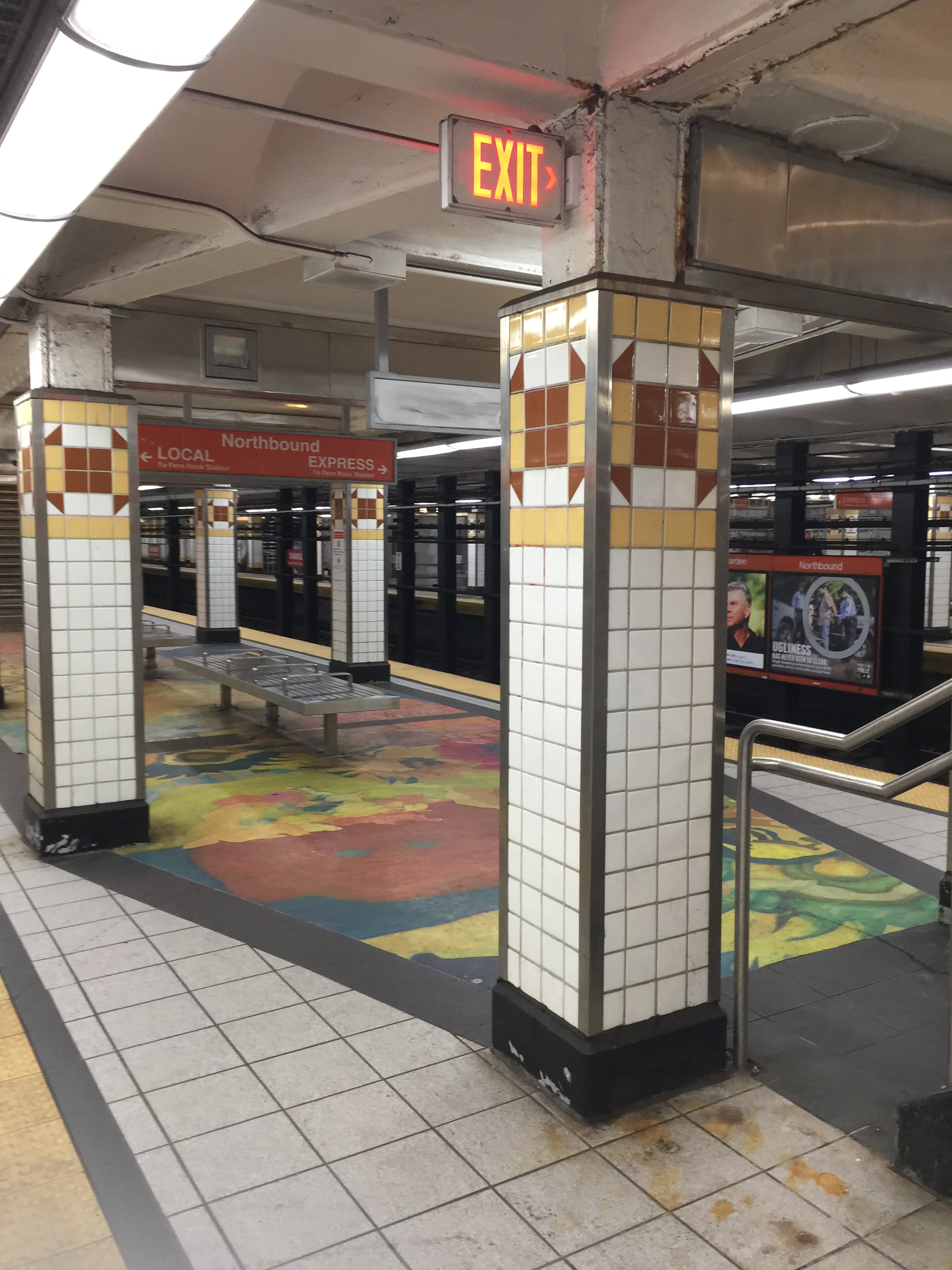

General information
- Location: 500 North Broad Street; Philadelphia, Pennsylvania
- Coordinates: 39.9621°N 75.1615°W
- Owner: City of Philadelphia
- Operator: SEPTA
- Platforms: 2 island platforms cross-platform interchange
- Tracks: 4
- Connections: SEPTA City Bus: 4, 16, 43

Construction
- Structure type: Underground
- Accessible: Yes

History
- Opened: September 1, 1928
- Rebuilt: 2009-2012
- Electrified: Third rail (600 volts)
- Former names: Spring Garden (1928–2025)

Services
Preceding station	SEPTA Metro	Following station
Race–Vine toward NRG Station	B (SEPTA Metro)	Fairmount toward Fern Rock T.C.
Race–Vine toward Walnut–Locust	B (SEPTA Metro)	Broad–Girard toward Fern Rock T.C.
Location

Broad–Spring Garden station is a subway station on the SEPTA Metro B in Philadelphia, Pennsylvania. It is an express station with four tracks and two island platforms. Spring Garden is the northernmost station in Center City, serving Community College of Philadelphia, the School District of Philadelphia Building, the Inquirer Building (former home of Philadelphia newspapers The Philadelphia Inquirer and Philadelphia Daily News), Ben Franklin High School, Julia R. Masterman School and miscellaneous office buildings, restaurants, and clubs. The Philadelphia Museum of Art is ten blocks west of the station, while the Northern Liberties neighborhood lies approximately eight blocks east.

Broad–Spring Garden station is the seventh busiest station on the B, with 10,000 riders a day.

== Gallery ==
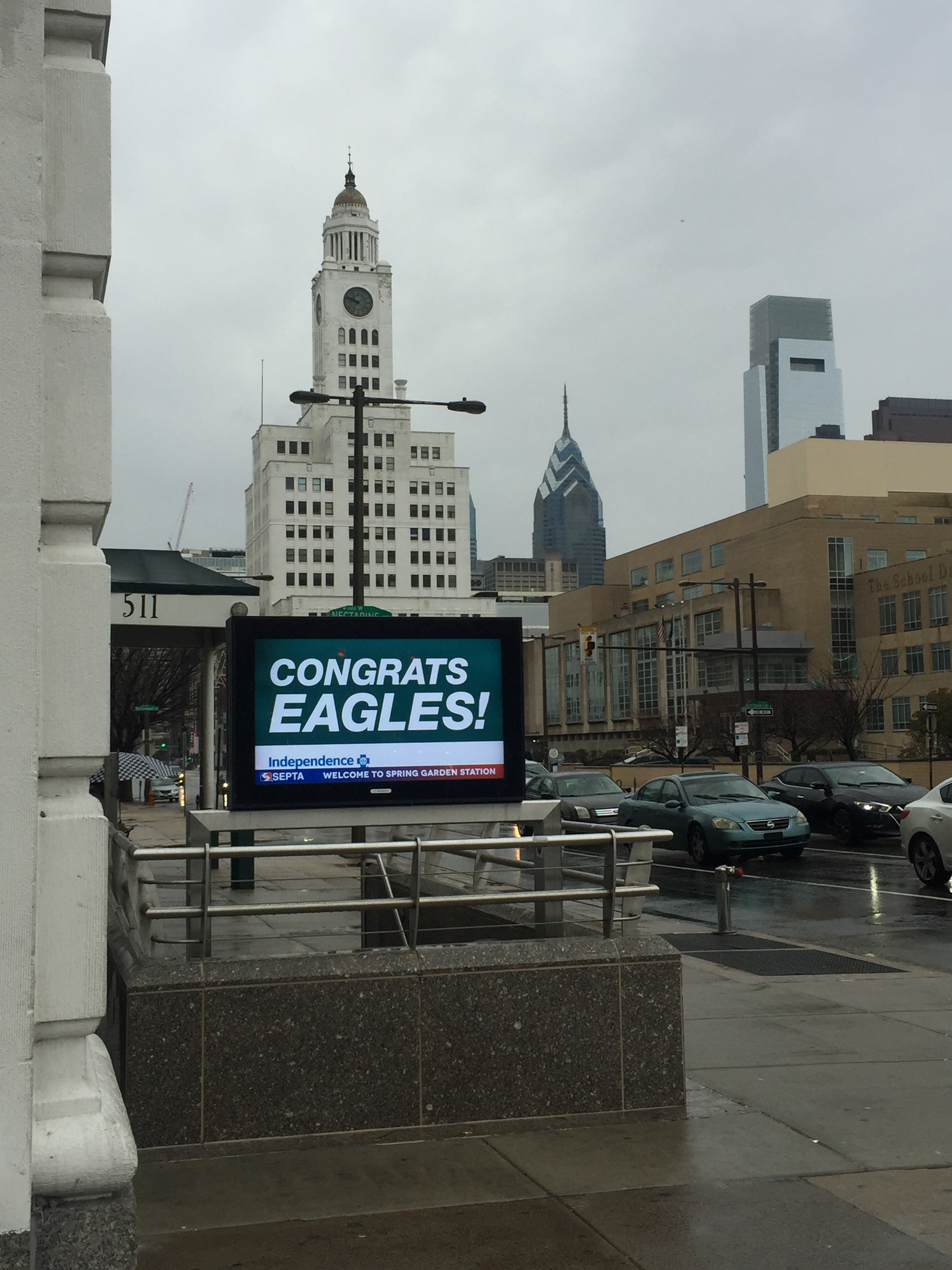
Broad–Spring Garden station with the Philadelphia Inquirer building and Center City buildings visible in the background

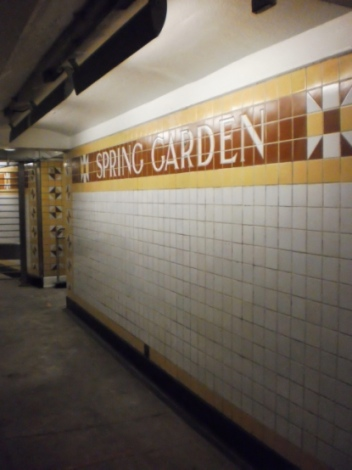
Tiles at Broad–Spring Garden station

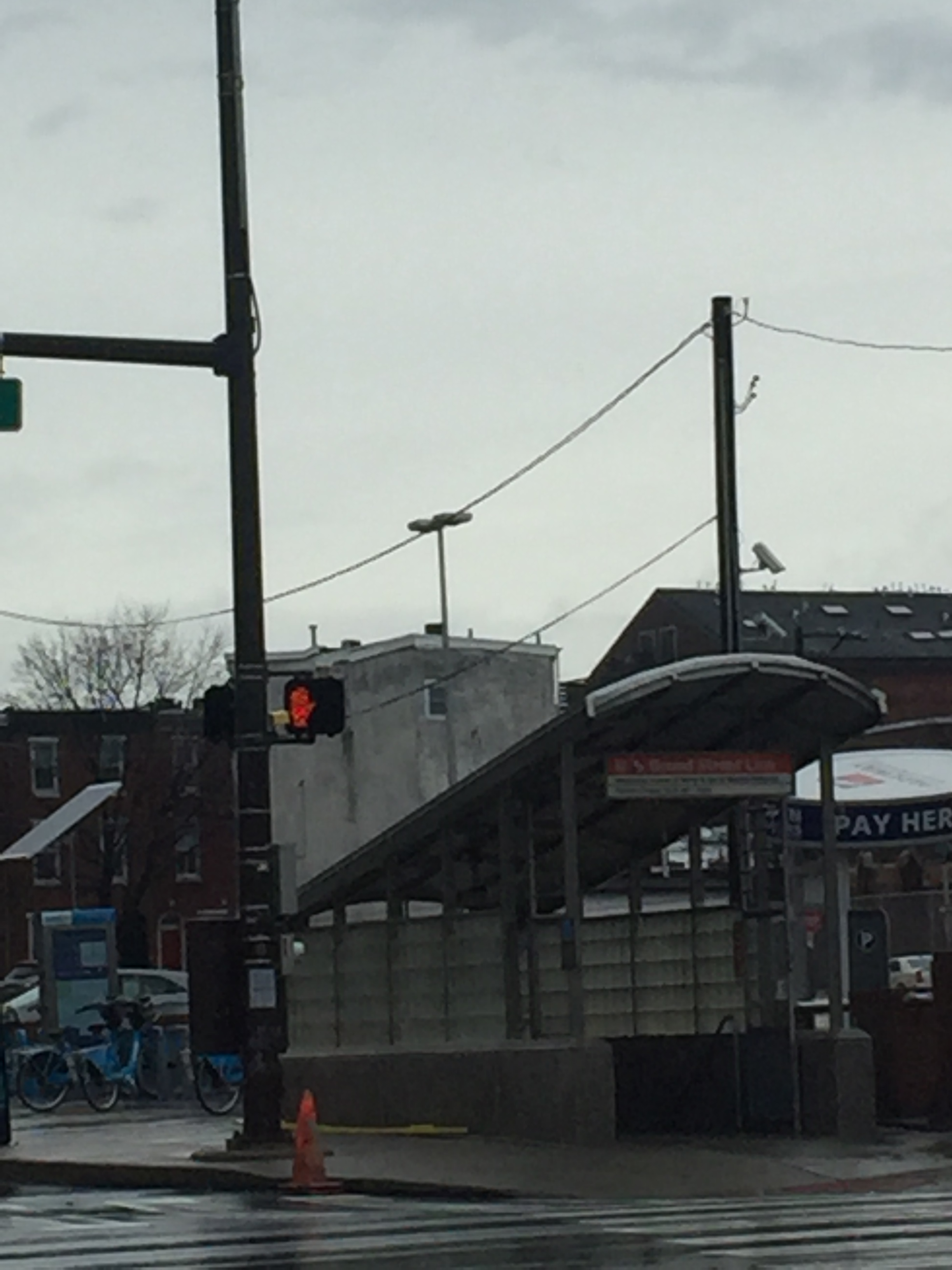
Broad–Spring Garden southwest entrance
