= Francisville, Philadelphia =

Francisville
- Neighborhood of Philadelphia
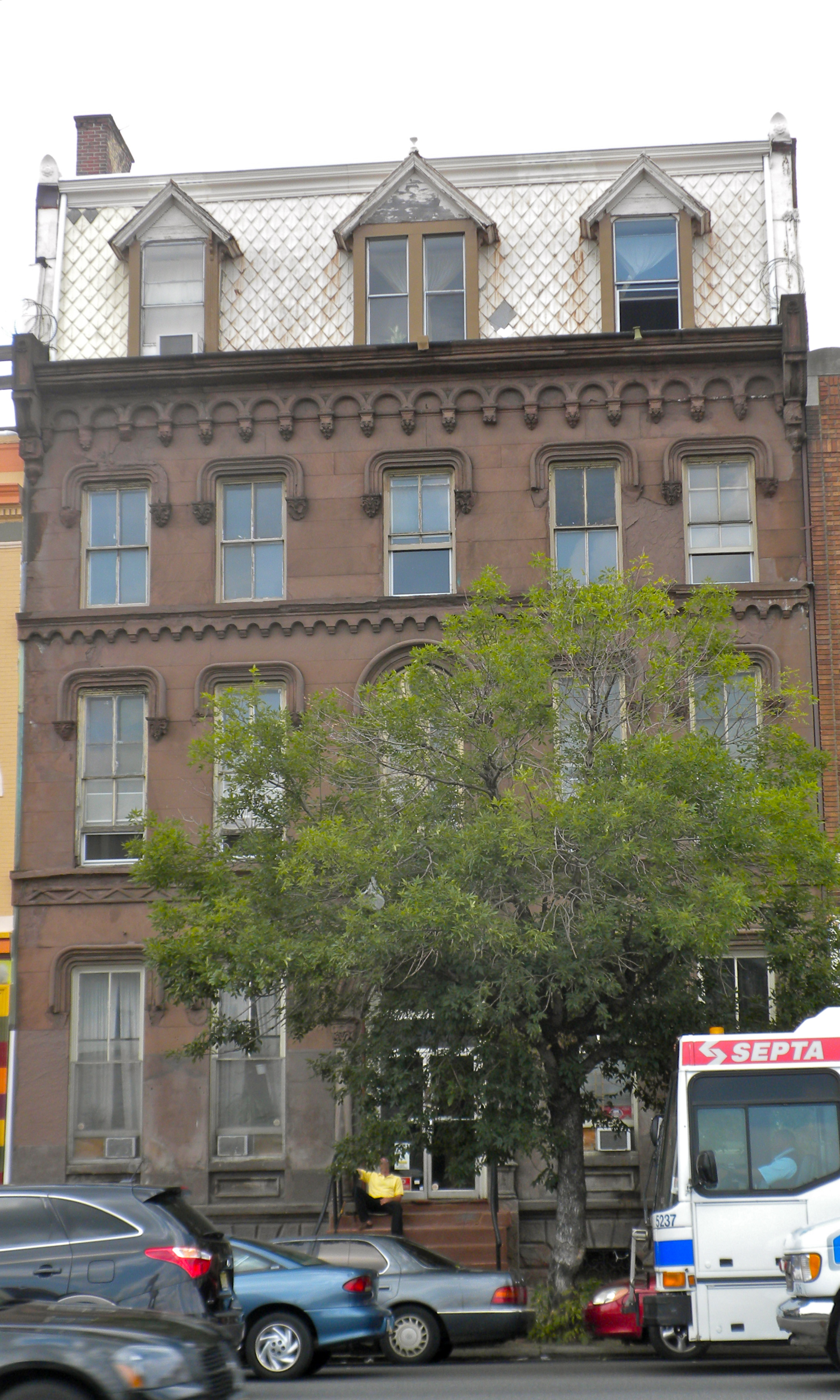
- Matthew Baird Mansion in the Francisville section of North Philadelphia

- Location within Philadelphia
- Country: United States
- State: Pennsylvania
- County: Philadelphia
- City: Philadelphia
- Area codes: 215, 267, and 445

Francisville is a neighborhood in North Philadelphia, a section of the city of Philadelphia, Pennsylvania, United States. Its boundaries are Fairmount Avenue to the south, Girard Avenue to the north, Broad Street to the east, and Corinthian Avenue to the west. In 2000, it had a population of about 4,500. It is sometimes considered to be a part of the Fairmount neighborhood, but Fairmount more specifically lies to Francisville's west. To its south is the Spring Garden neighborhood. The neighborhood is named after Tench Francis.

== Street grid ==
Francisville's street grid is unique because some of it is parallel to Ridge Avenue, rather than being oriented north-south. This is because this section was settled before the uniform street grid of Philadelphia had extended that far north. The community was likely a small village on the Ridge Avenue route from Philadelphia proper (today's Center City) to East Falls.

== Recent history ==
In recent years the community has become more activist, with the Francisville Neighborhood Development Corporation, Concerned Citizens of Francisville, and the United Francisville Civic Association representing the neighborhood in efforts to improve housing and cut down on crime. A city program called the Neighborhood Transformation Initiative has brought the wrecking ball to many properties, with the hopes that building some new structures in the region is a better solution than costly renovations to blighted historic buildings.

== SEPTA service ==
The neighborhood is served by Broad Street subway stations at Fairmount and Girard, the SEPTA Route 15 trolley on Girard Avenue, in addition to the 2, 33, and 61 bus routes.

== Notable people ==
- Lil Uzi Vert, rapper and singer
