= Lombard–South station =

Rapid transit station in Philadelphia

Lombard–South
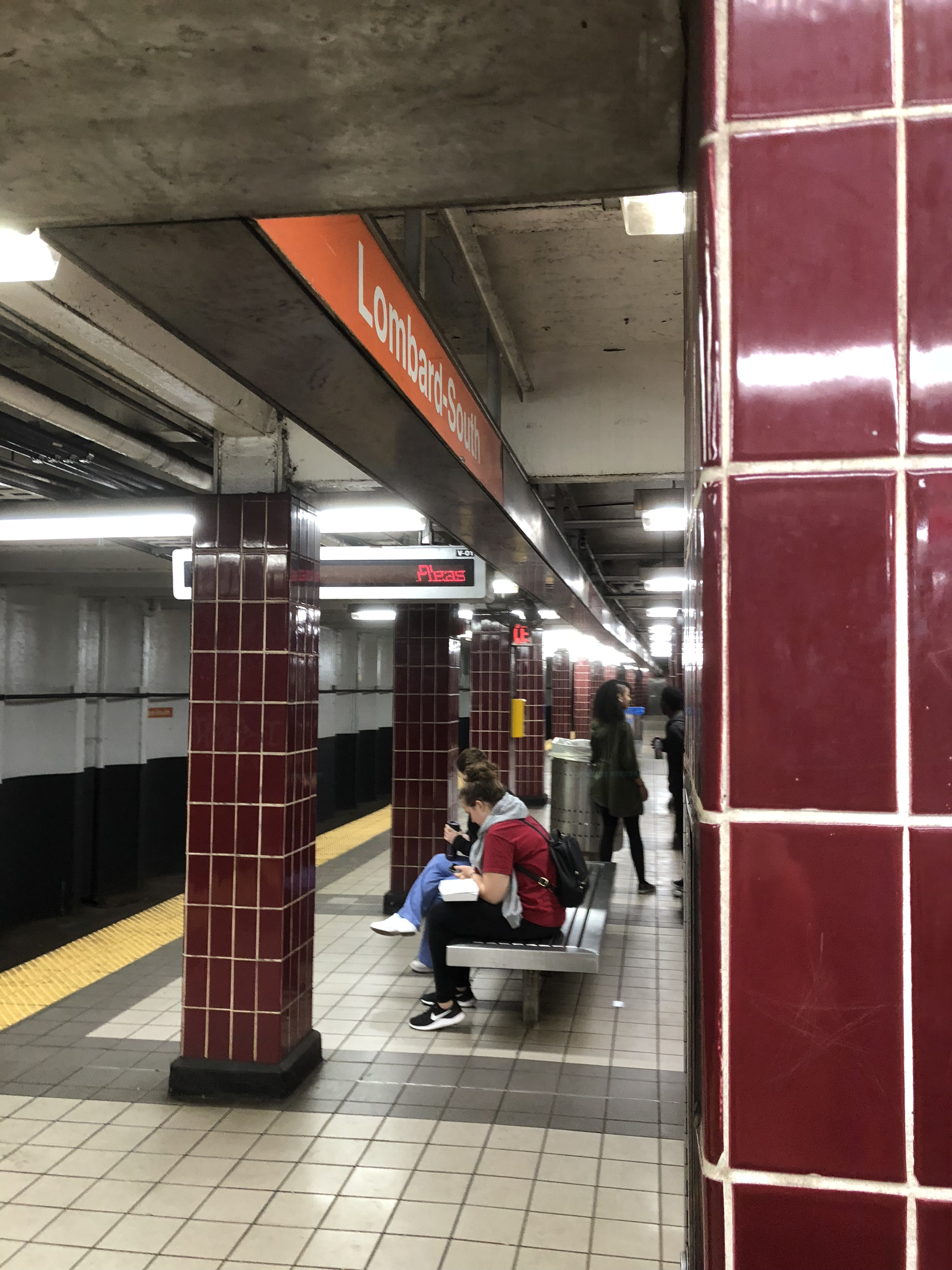
- Lombard South station platform

General information
- Location: 500 South Broad Street; Philadelphia, Pennsylvania
- Coordinates: 39.9447°N 75.1653°W
- Owner: City of Philadelphia
- Operator: SEPTA
- Platforms: 1 island platform
- Tracks: 2
- Connections: SEPTA City Bus: 4, 27, 32, 40

Construction
- Structure type: Underground
- Accessible: No, planned

History
- Opened: April 20, 1930

Services
Preceding station	SEPTA Metro	Following station
Ellsworth–Federal toward NRG Station	B (SEPTA Metro)	Walnut–Locust toward Fern Rock T.C.
(special events) does not stop here
Location

Lombard–South station is a subway station on the SEPTA Metro B, located at 500 South Broad Street, at the intersection of Broad Street and Lombard Street in the Washington Square West area of Philadelphia, Pennsylvania. It serves only Broad Street Line local service trains and consists of one platform.

Lombard–South station is located within short walking distance of the South Street Headhouse District (approximately 4-5 blocks east). Other area sights include the University of the Arts, Peirce College, and, approximately four blocks west, the Graduate Hospital campus and neighborhood.

== Station layout ==
There are four street entrances to the station, two at Broad and South streets, as well as two at Broad and Lombard streets.

== Gallery ==
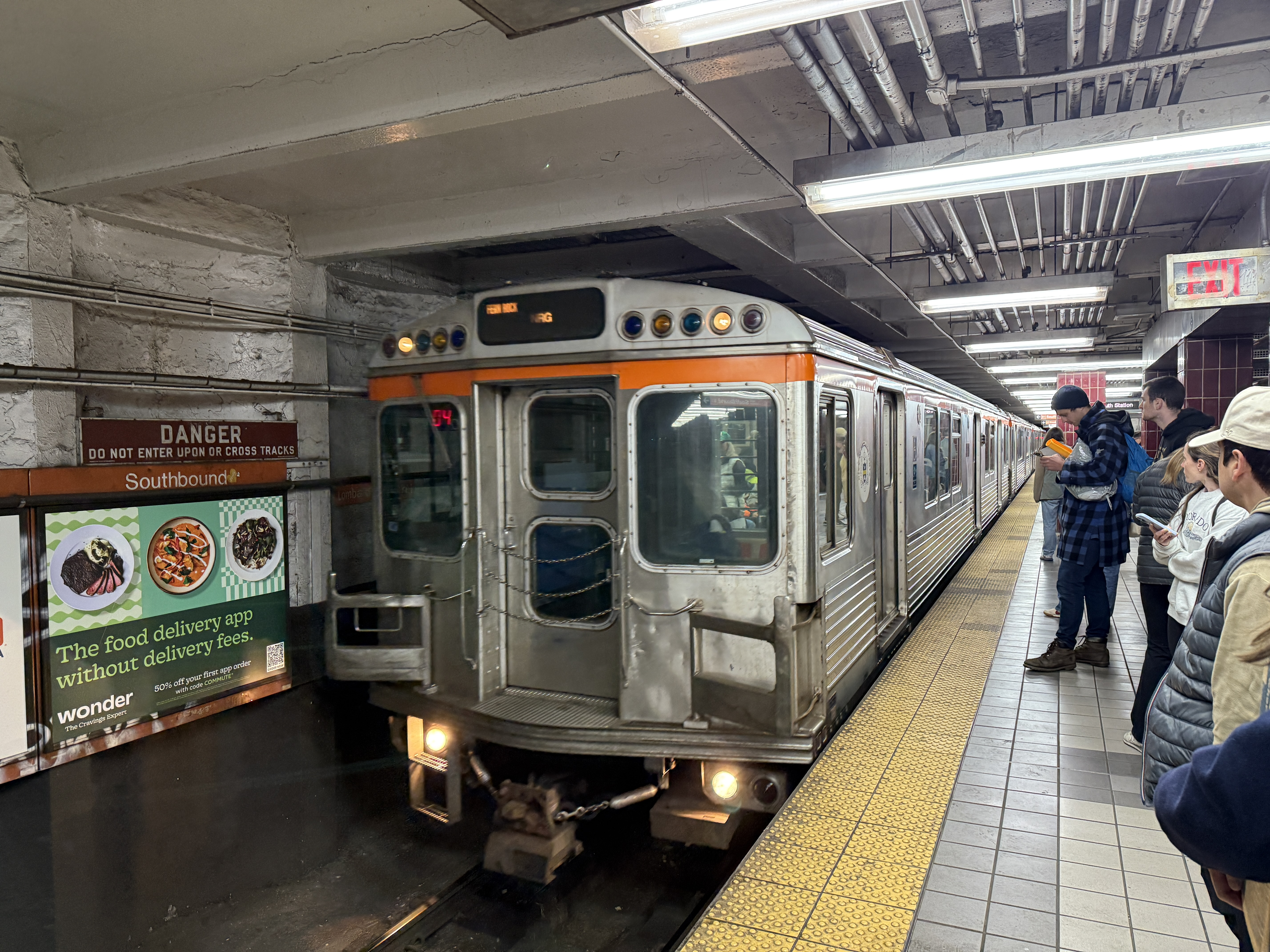
Southbound B1 train at station

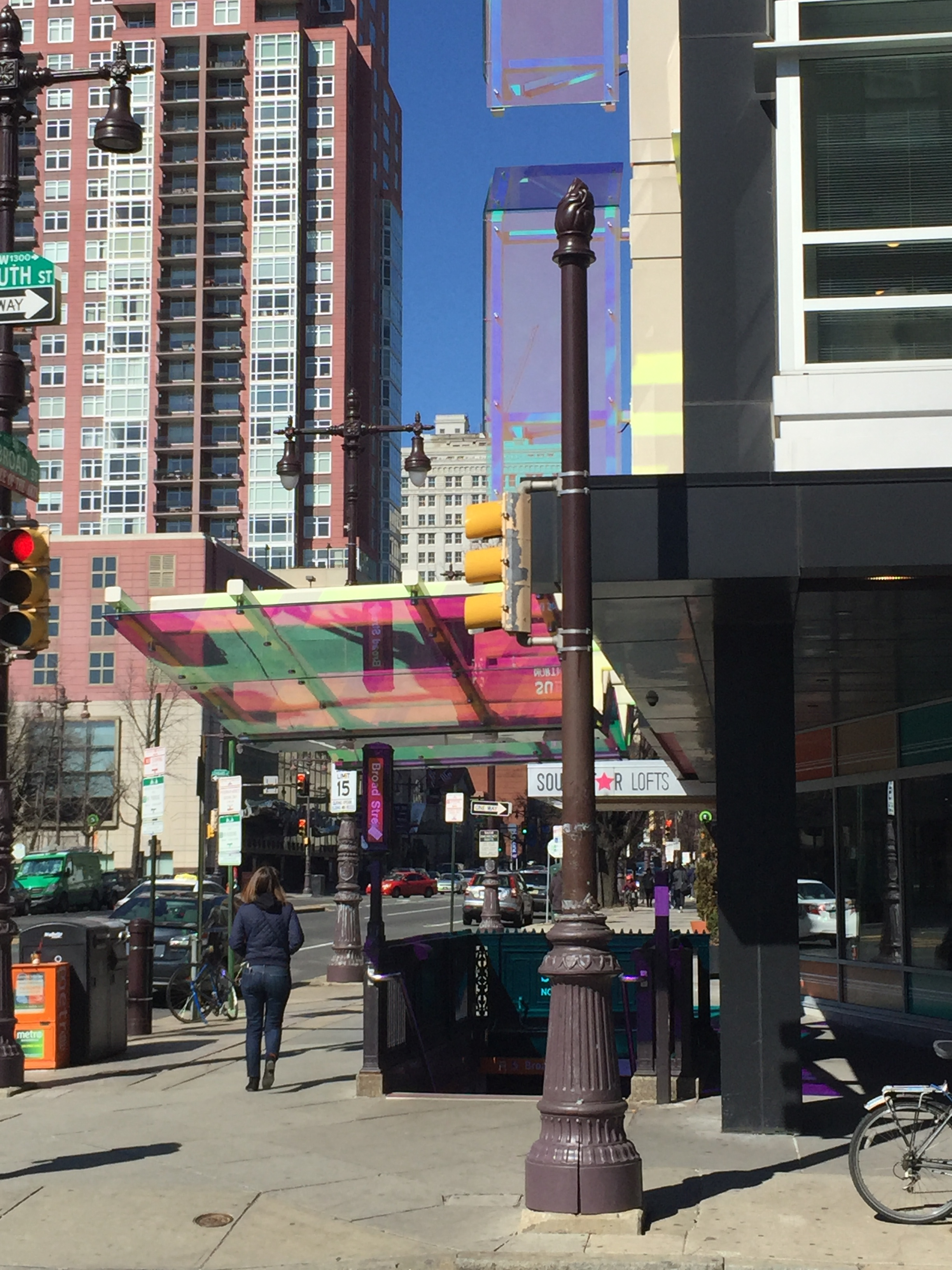
Station entrance

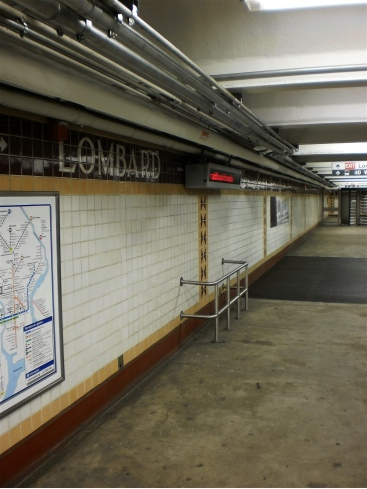
Mezzanine level near the Lombard Street exit.

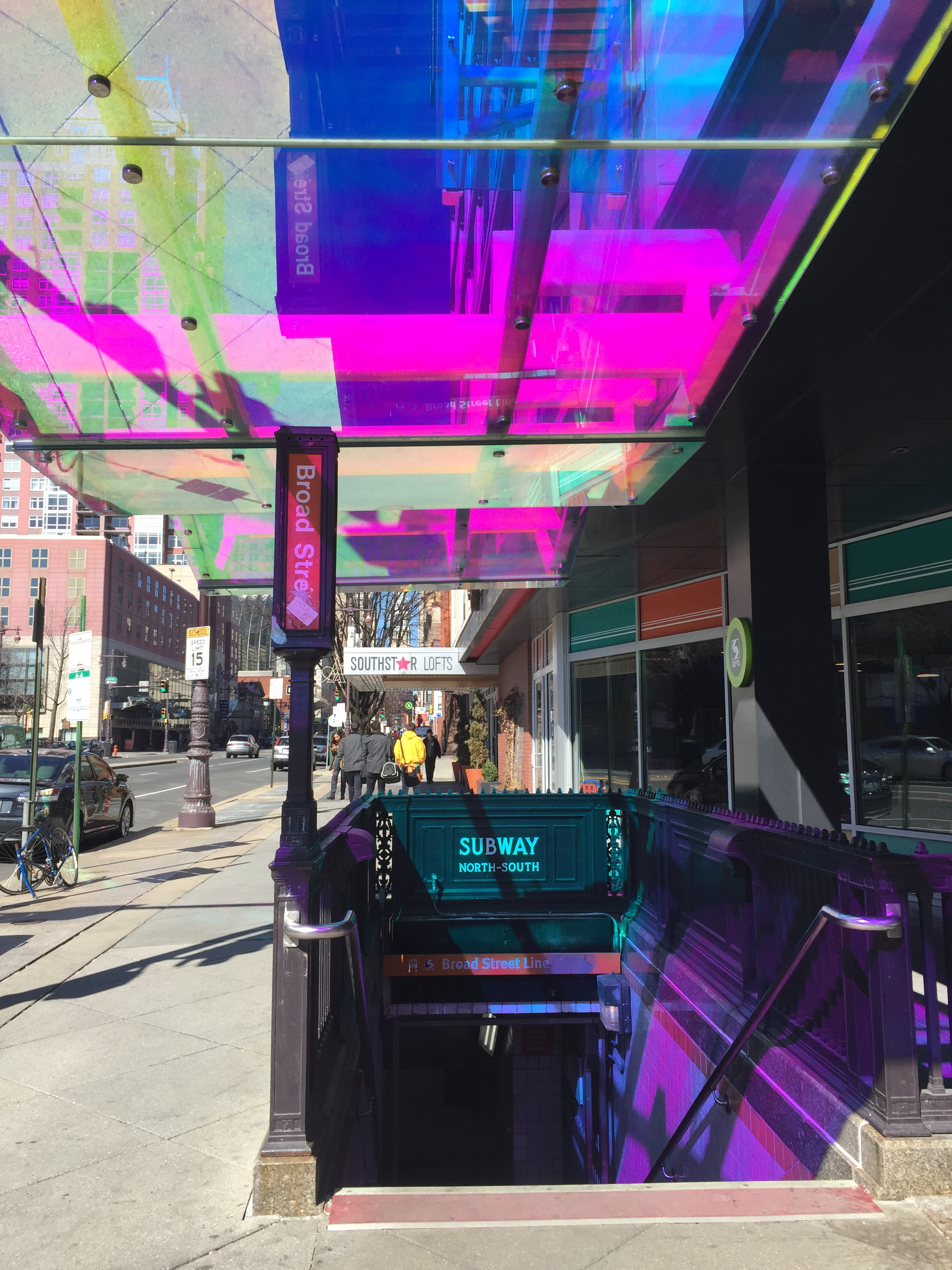
Entrance at South & Broad

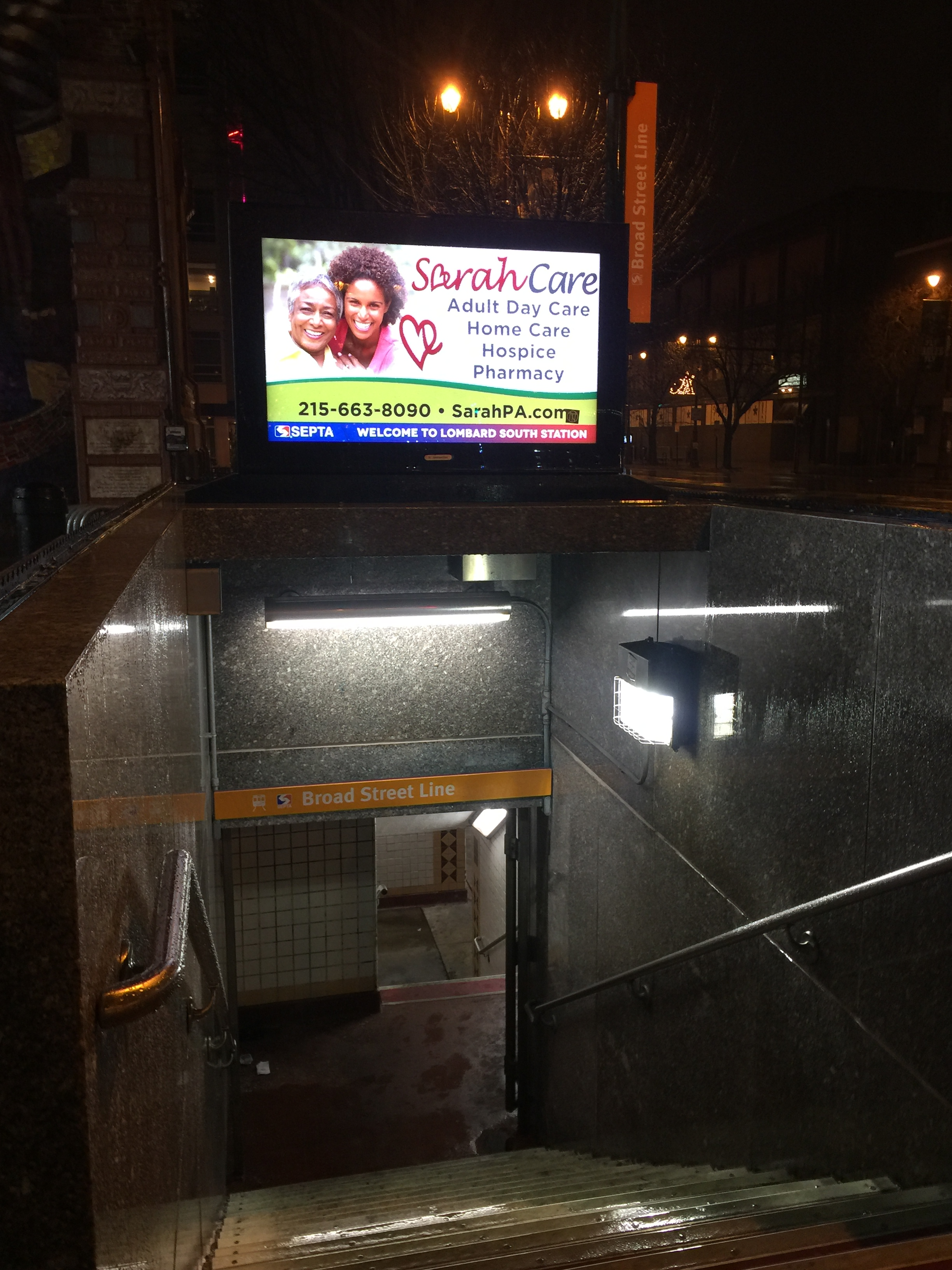
Entrance at Lombard & Broad

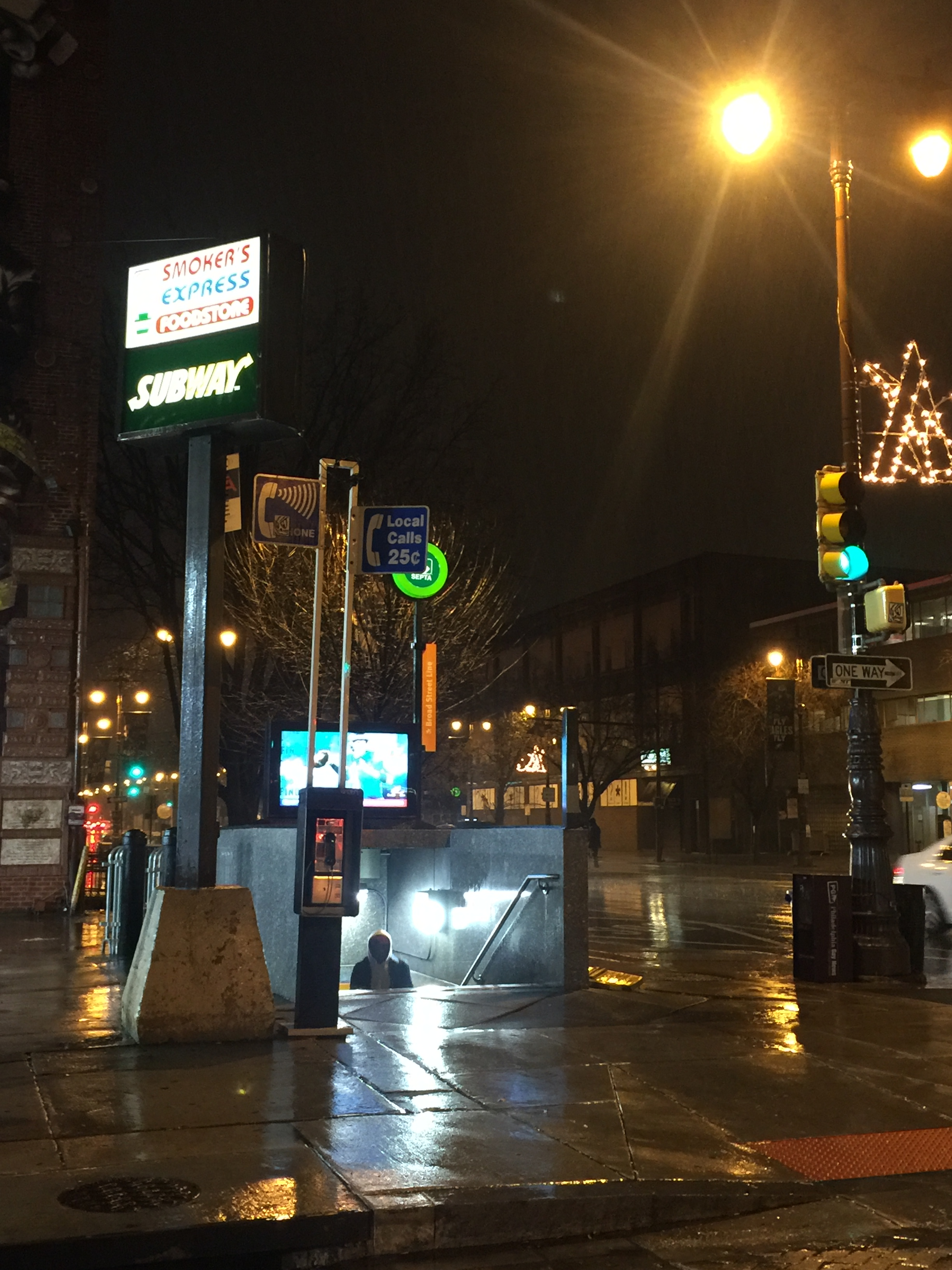
Street level station entrance at Lombard and Broad
