= Fairmount station (SEPTA) =

Rapid transit station in Philadelphia

Fairmount
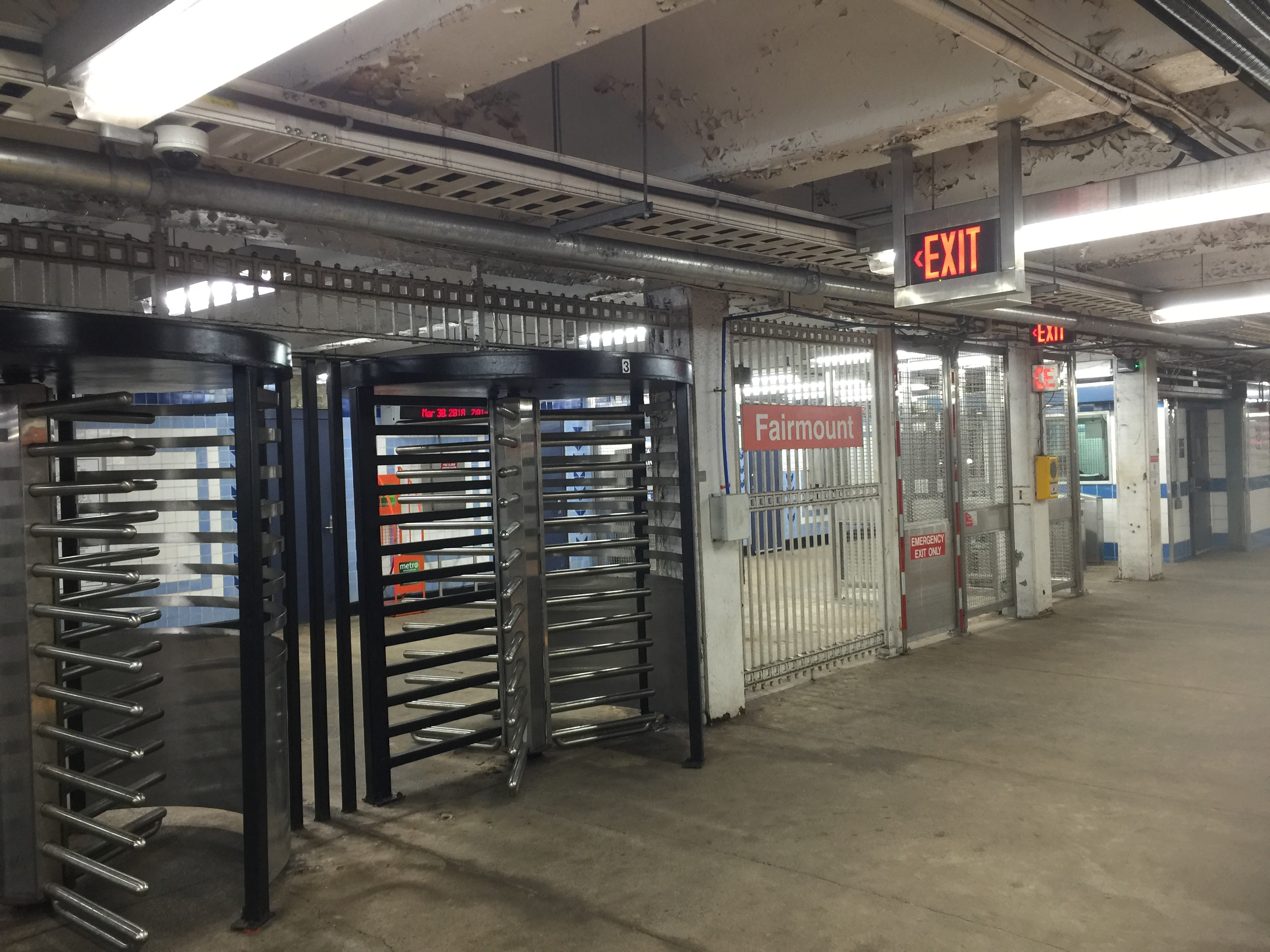
- Fairmount station entrance at Ridge and Broad

General information
- Location: 700 North Broad Street; Philadelphia, Pennsylvania
- Coordinates: 39°58′02″N 75°09′37″W
- Owner: City of Philadelphia
- Operator: SEPTA
- Platforms: Upper Level: 2 side platforms; Lower Level: 1 island platform
- Tracks: Upper Level: 4; Lower Level: 2
- Connections: SEPTA City Bus: 4, 16, 61

Construction
- Structure type: Underground
- Accessible: No, accessibility planned

History
- Opened: September 1, 1928
- Rebuilt: 1932 (Broad Ridge Spur)

Services
Preceding station	SEPTA Metro	Following station
Broad–Spring Garden toward NRG Station	B (SEPTA Metro)	Broad–Girard toward Fern Rock T.C.
Chinatown toward 8th–Market	B (SEPTA Metro)	Broad–Girard toward Fern Rock T.C.
does not stop here
Former services
Preceding station	SEPTA	Following station
Spring Garden toward 8th & Market	Broad–Ridge Spur	Broad–Girard toward Olney or Fern Rock
Location

Fairmount station is a subway station in the Francisville section of North Philadelphia, Pennsylvania.

The station is served by SEPTA's B1 and the B3. There are three separate platforms. The B3 and B1 northbound platforms connect inside the faregates, but the B1's southbound platform cannot be reached from the other two without exiting. Such a connection once existed; the sealed-off entrance can be seen at platform level heading south towards the end of the platform. Travelers wishing to switch between the B3 and the southbound B1 must connect at Broad-Girard. The B3's platform is shortened and can only accommodate short 2-car trains; the unused part of the platform is visible from passing trains and is covered in layers of graffiti. Fairmount station on the B3 has a full mezzanine concourse extending from Wallace Street to Ridge Avenue, now abandoned.

== Gallery ==
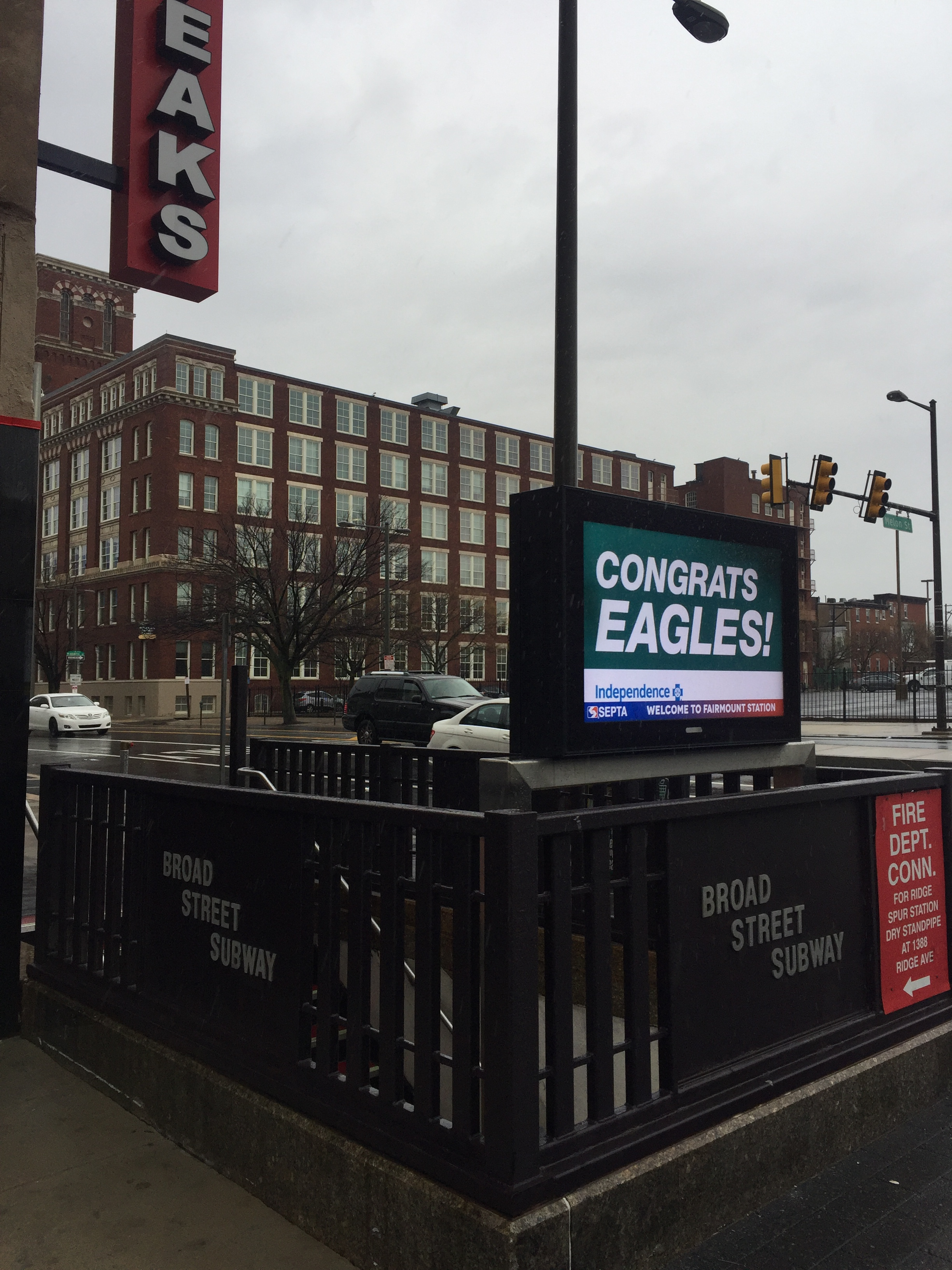
Station entrance

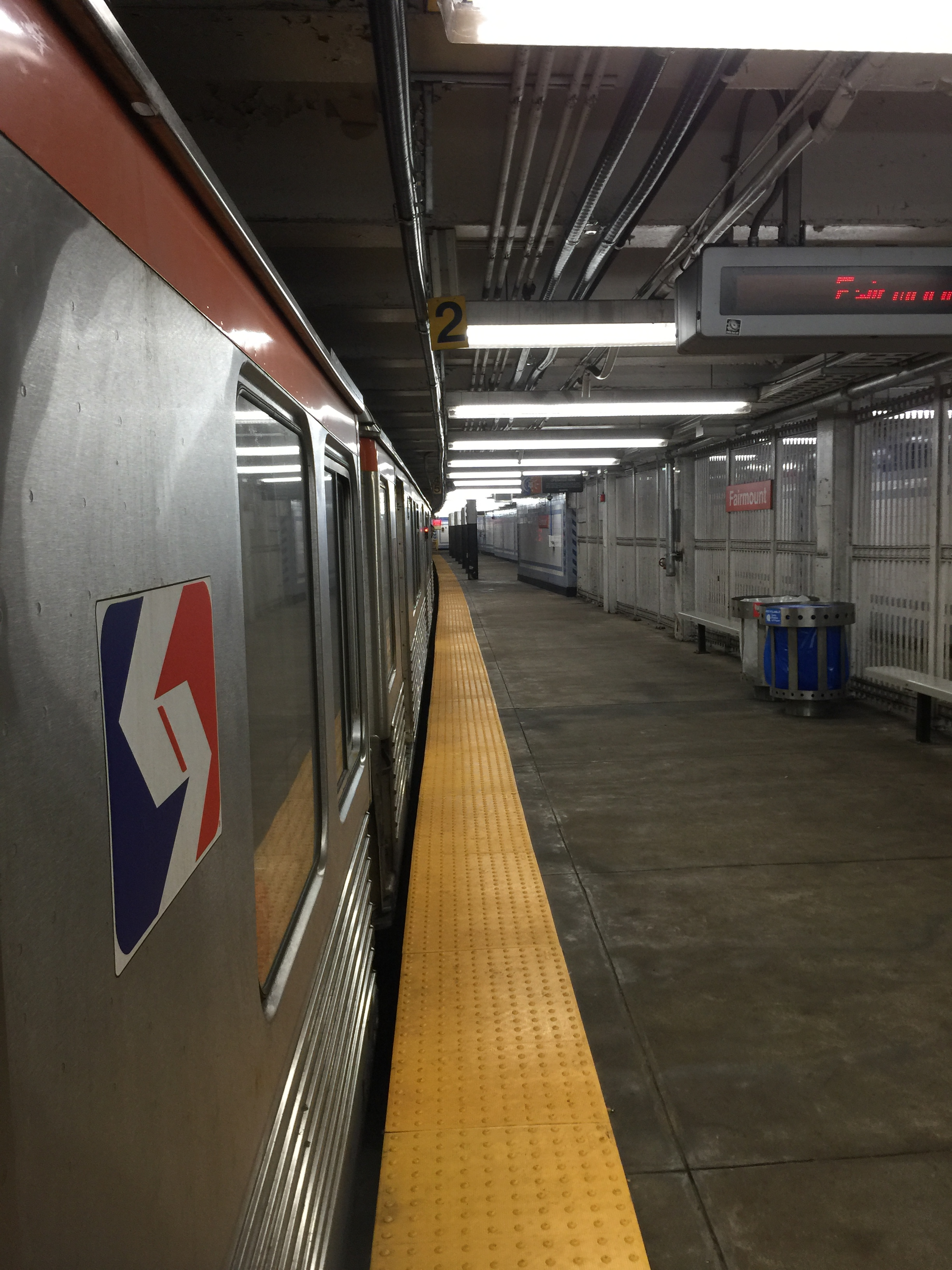
B1 platform

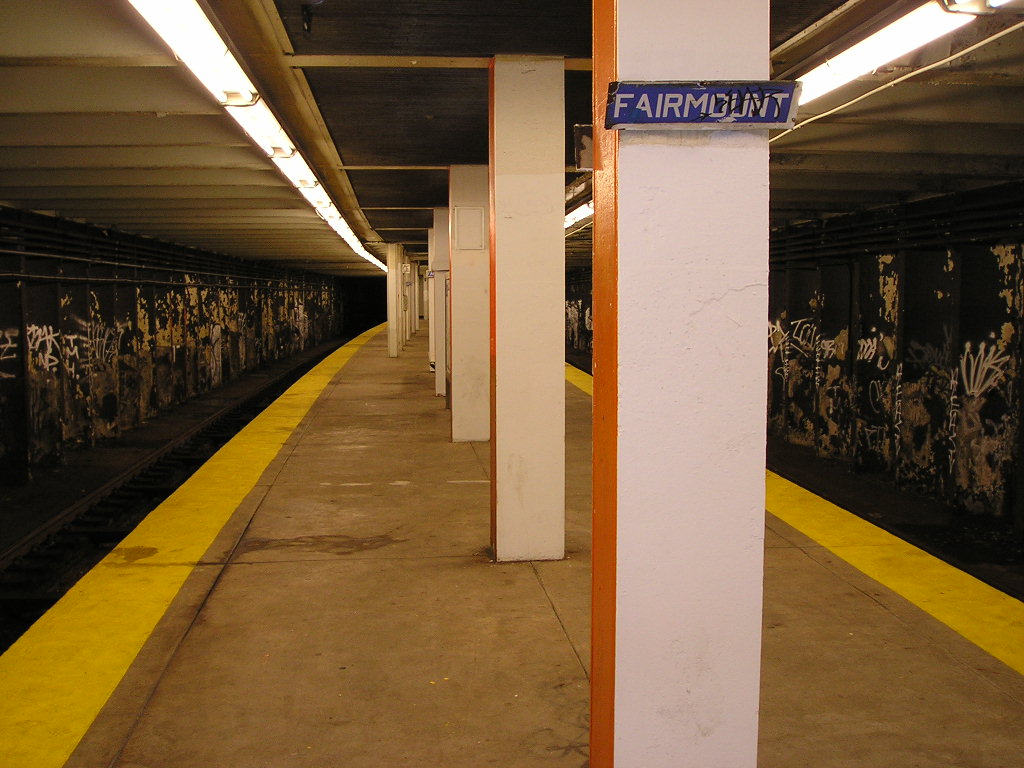
B3 platform

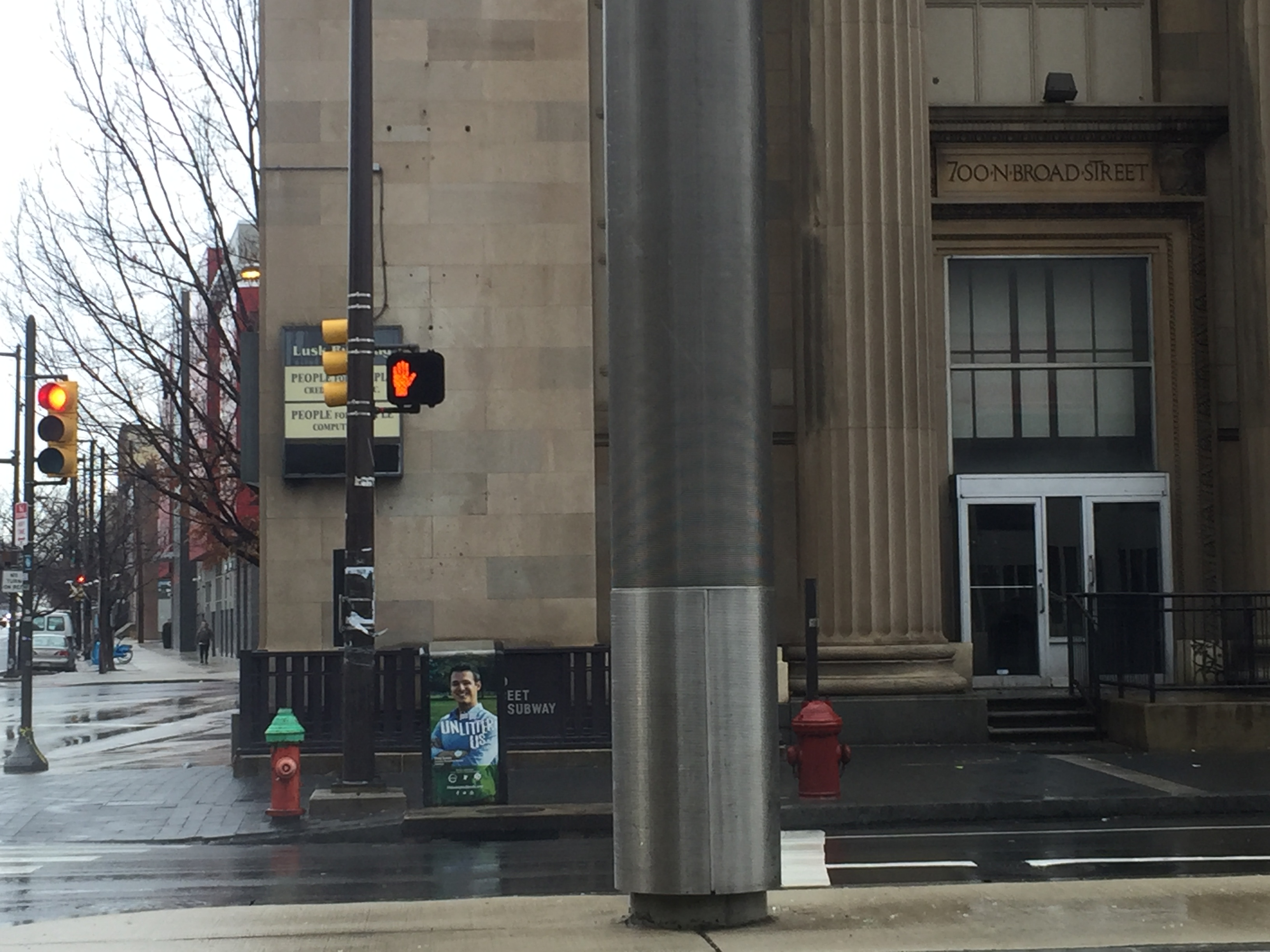
Fairmount station entrance in front of 700 North Broad Street
