= Race–Vine station =

Rapid transit station in Philadelphia

Race–Vine
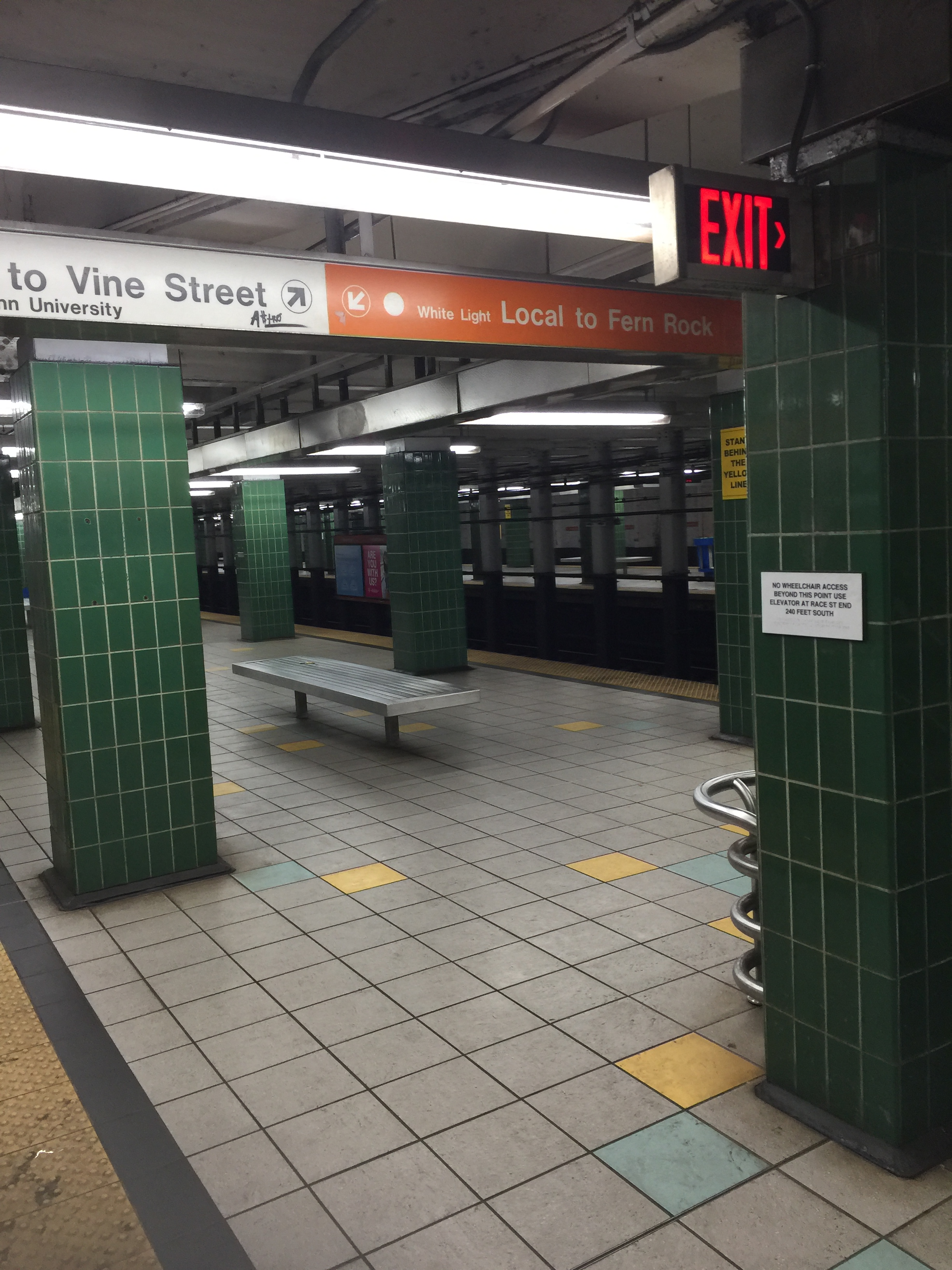
- The station's northbound platform

General information
- Location: 300 North Broad Street; Philadelphia, Pennsylvania, U.S.
- Coordinates: 39.9582°N 75.1623°W
- Owner: City of Philadelphia
- Operator: SEPTA
- Platforms: 2 island platforms cross-platform interchange
- Tracks: 4
- Connections: SEPTA City Bus: 4, 16, 27; NJT Bus: 400, 401, 402, 404, 406, 408, 409, 410, 412

Construction
- Structure type: Underground
- Accessible: Yes

History
- Opened: September 1, 1928
- Electrified: Yes, Third rail (600 volts)

Services
Preceding station	SEPTA Metro	Following station
15th Street/City Hall toward NRG Station	B (SEPTA Metro)	Broad–Spring Garden toward Fern Rock T.C.
15th Street/City Hall toward Walnut–Locust	B (SEPTA Metro)	Broad–Spring Garden toward Fern Rock T.C.
Location

Race–Vine is a rapid transit subway station on the SEPTA Metro B. It is located at 300 North Broad Street (PA 611) in Center City, Philadelphia and is served by both local and express trains.

The station is named after nearby Race Street and Vine Street, which today acts as a frontage road along Interstate 676, although its official address is closer to westbound Vine than Race. This stop is also designated on B maps as the stop for the Pennsylvania Convention Center, with signs directing passengers to the appropriate exits. However, riding the B one stop south to 15th Street/City Hall and then connecting to the L east toward Frankford and then exiting at 11th Street station will bring passengers right inside the Pennsylvania Convention Center and the Fashion District.

In addition to the Convention Center, the Race–Vine station serves several office buildings and institutions, including Thomas Jefferson University, the Parkway Museum District, Roman Catholic High School, and Drexel University's School of Nursing.

Transfers exist to SEPTA City Bus routes 4, 16, and 27, in addition to a number of NJ Transit bus routes, which board at the northeast corner of Broad and Vine Streets. Until the mid-1990s, there was a concourse that ran under Broad Street from City Hall to the Race Street side of the station.

== Gallery ==
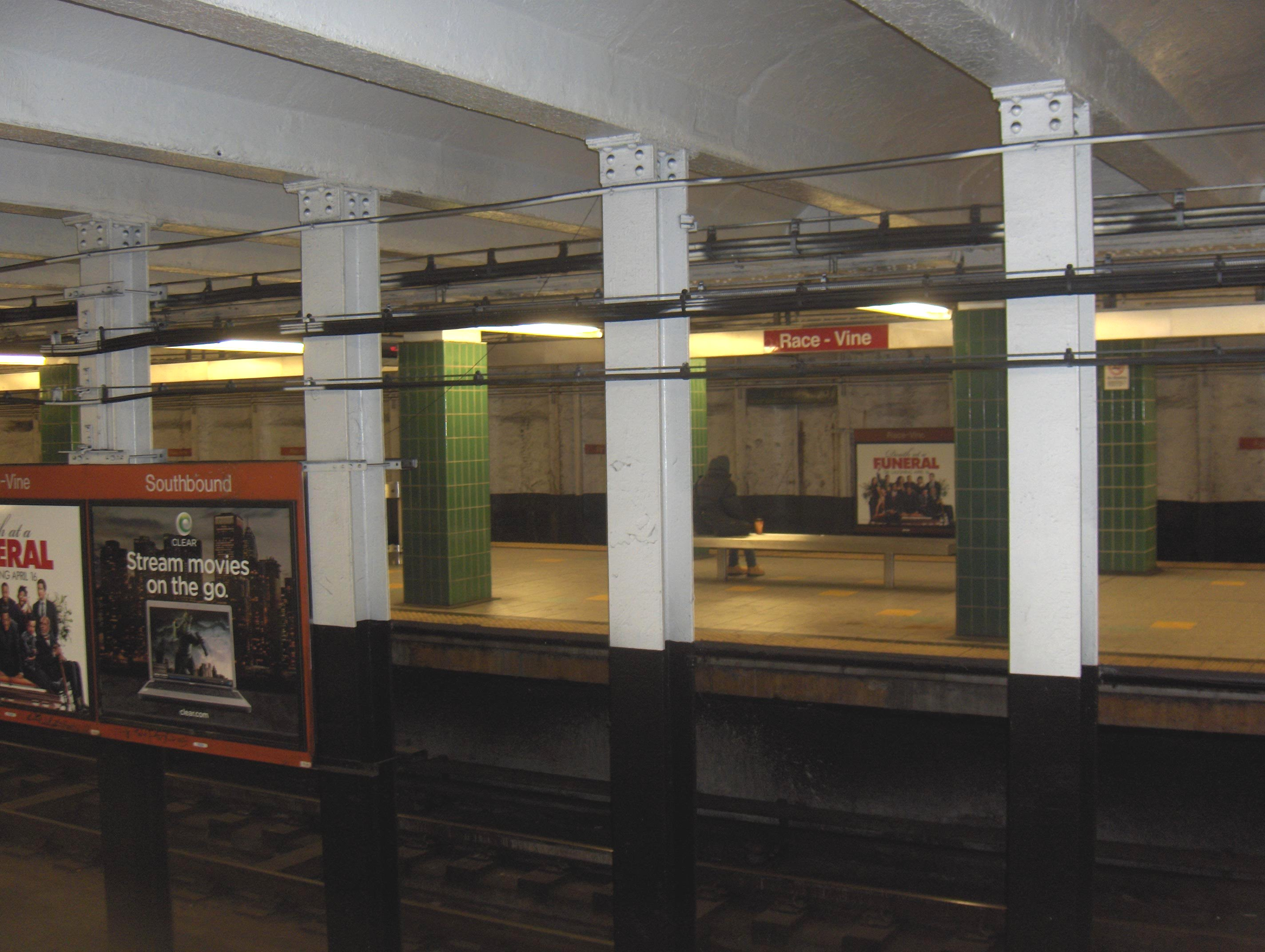
Race–Vine station in 2010

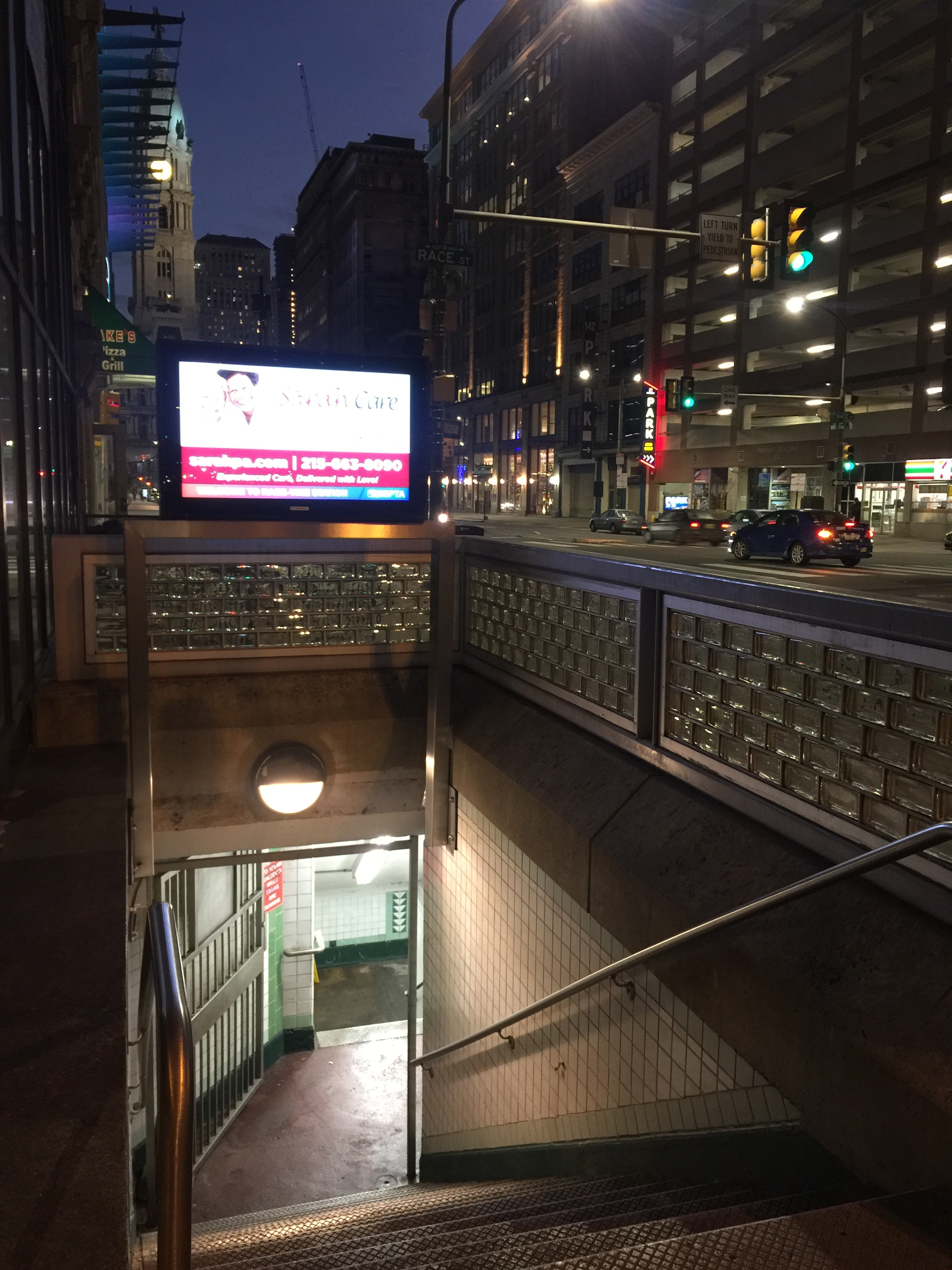
Race–Vine station in 2018, with City Hall visible in the background

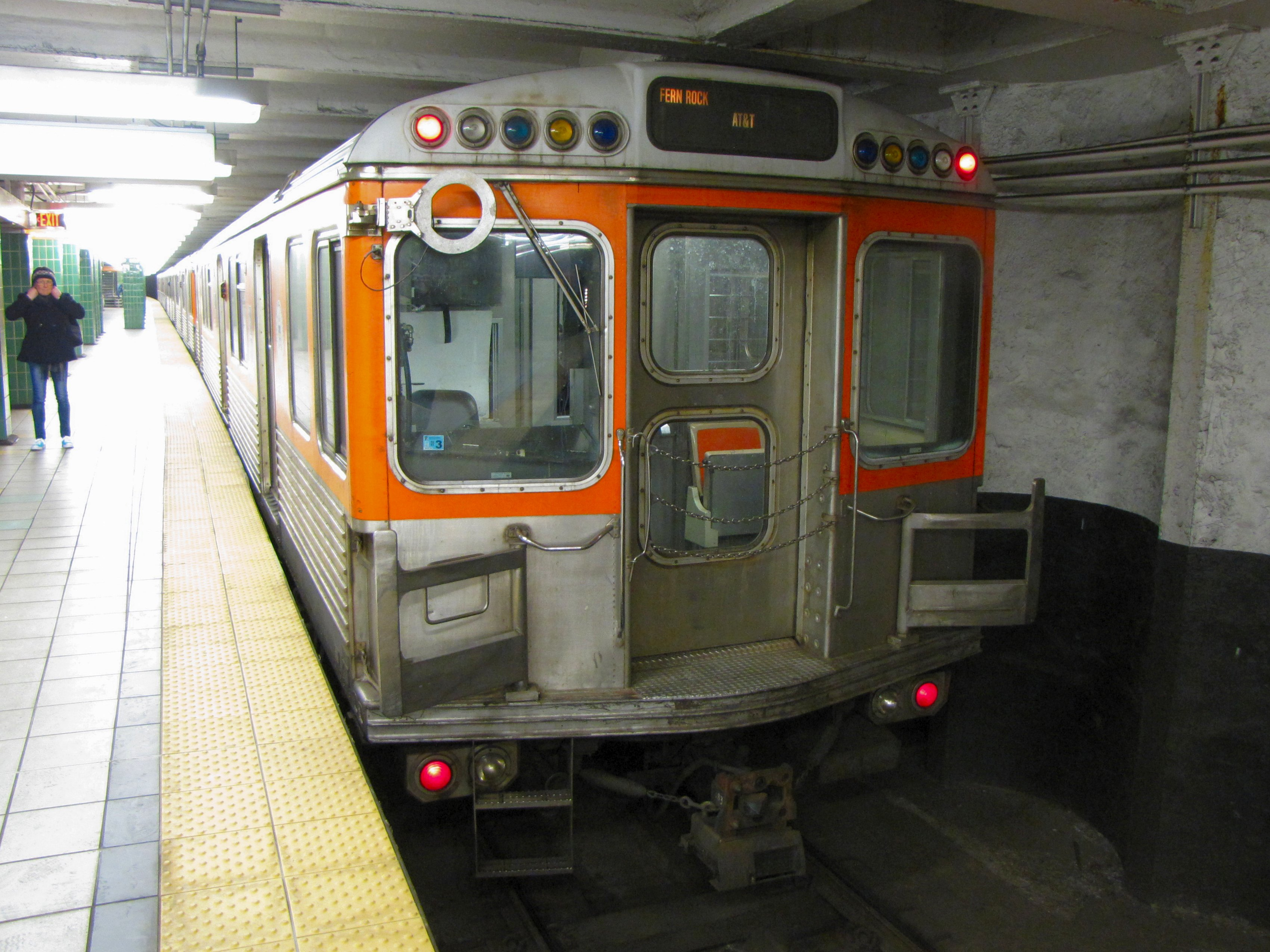
B train at the station
