= Broad–Girard station =

Rapid transit station in Philadelphia

Broad–Girard
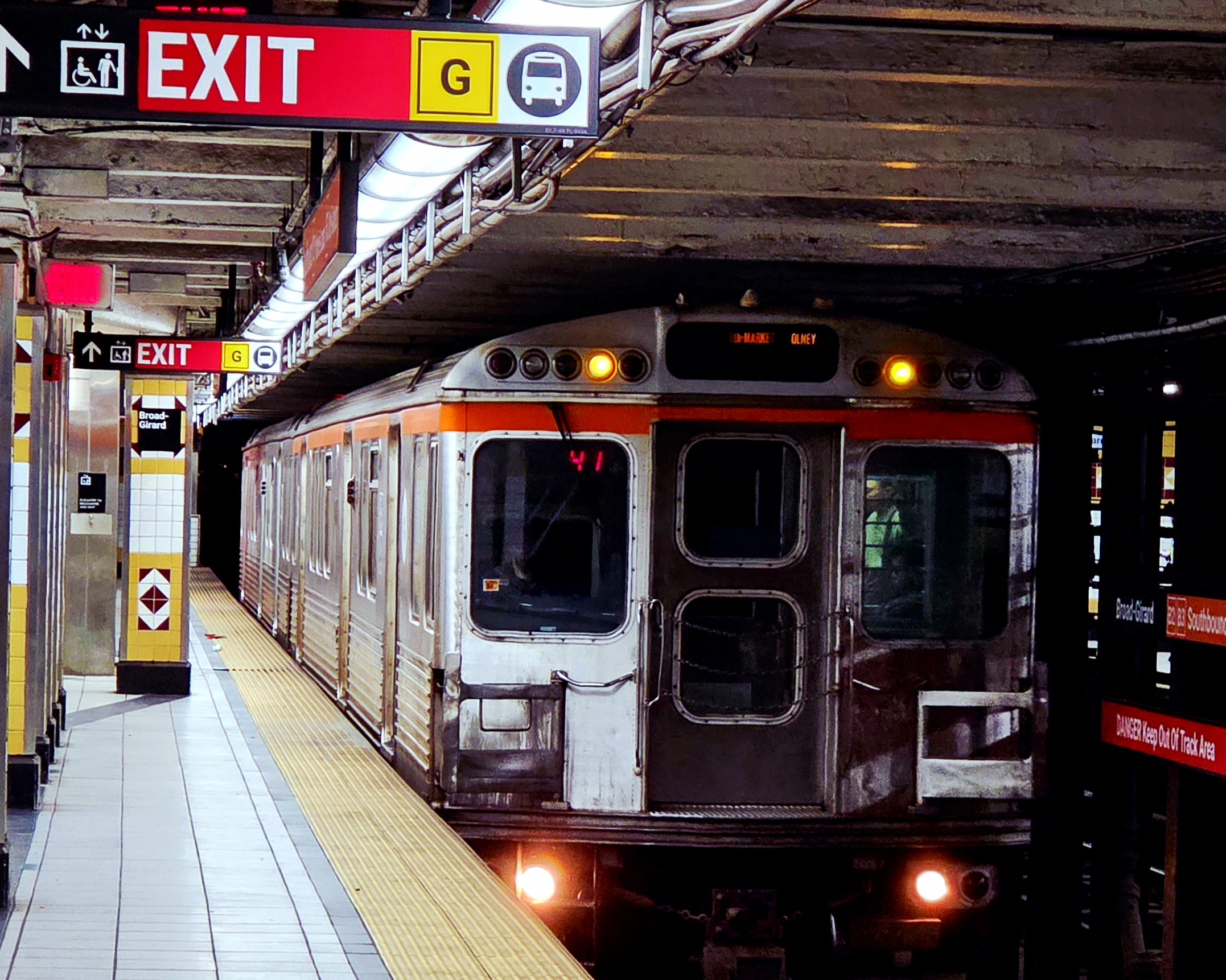
- A southbound B3 train at Broad–Girard in 2026

General information
- Location: 1200 North Broad Street; Philadelphia, Pennsylvania
- Coordinates: 39°58′17″N 75°09′34″W
- Owner: City of Philadelphia
- Operator: SEPTA
- Platforms: 2 island platforms
- Tracks: 6 (4 B, 2 G)
- Connections: SEPTA City Bus: 4, 16

Construction
- Accessible: Yes

History
- Opened: September 1, 1928
- Rebuilt: 2009–2012
- Former names: Girard (1928–2025)

Services
Preceding station	SEPTA Metro	Following station
Fairmount toward NRG Station	B (SEPTA Metro)	Cecil B. Moore toward Fern Rock T.C.
Broad–Spring Garden toward Walnut–Locust	B (SEPTA Metro)	Erie toward Fern Rock T.C.
Fairmount toward 8th–Market	B (SEPTA Metro)	North Philadelphia toward Fern Rock T.C.
63rd–Girard Terminus	major stops	Front–Girard toward Richmond–Westmoreland
Location

Broad–Girard station is a SEPTA Metro station served by B trains and G trolleys in the Francisville section of North Philadelphia, Pennsylvania. The station receives express service, with B2 and B3 trains stopping at the station. It has four underground tracks and two underground central platforms. On the surface, G trolleys stop along Girard Avenue. The station is located in a very busy commercial strip along Girard Avenue, and also serves the southernmost sections of Temple University. This is the last station where southbound riders can transfer freely between B3 trains and B1 and B2 trains, and the three services commonly meet here and wait for one another. A transfer is available at the station between the B and G.

The station was featured prominently in the 2019 sci-fi movie In the Shadow of the Moon.
