= Tasker–Morris station =

Rapid transit station in Philadelphia

Tasker–Morris
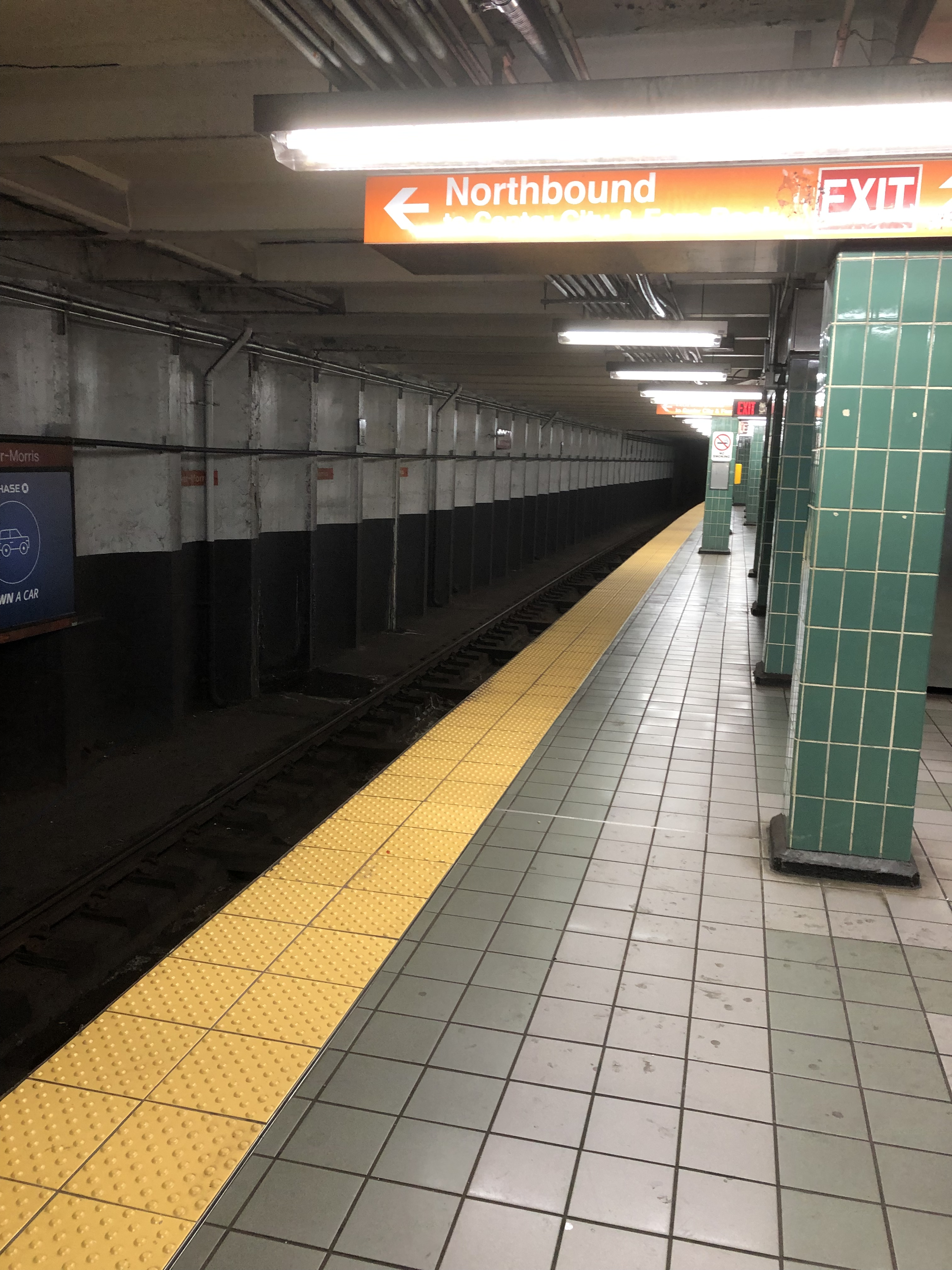
- Tasker–Morris station platform

General information
- Location: 1600 South Broad Street; Philadelphia, Pennsylvania
- Coordinates: 39.930308°N 75.168226°W
- Owner: City of Philadelphia
- Operator: SEPTA
- Platforms: 1 island platform
- Tracks: 2
- Connections: SEPTA City Bus: 4, 29

Construction
- Structure type: Underground
- Accessible: Yes

History
- Opened: September 18, 1938

Services
Preceding station	SEPTA Metro	Following station
Snyder toward NRG Station	B (SEPTA Metro)	Ellsworth–Federal toward Fern Rock T.C.
(special events) does not stop here
Location

Tasker–Morris station is a rapid transit subway station on the SEPTA Metro B. It is located at 1600 South Broad Street in South Philadelphia, Pennsylvania and serves only local trains. The station is named for the nearby Tasker Street to the north and Morris Street to the south. In between the two streets is a customer service office for the Philadelphia Gas Works.

The streets Tasker and Morris were named after Thomas P. Tasker and Henry and Stephen Morris, the two families that founded the companies Morris, Tasker & Morris, and later the Pascal Iron Works, which occupied a site on Fifth Street between the two streets that would later take their name.

The song "Tasker-Morris Station" by The Menzingers is about the station. The song "Wedding Singer" by Modern Baseball also references the station. The song "selfish hate" by Jawny also references the station.

== Station layout ==
There are five street entrances to the station, two at Broad and Tasker streets, and an elevator and two entrances at Broad and Morris streets. One entrance on Morris Street was moved to Broad Street, allowing for extra station visibility and access.

== Gallery ==
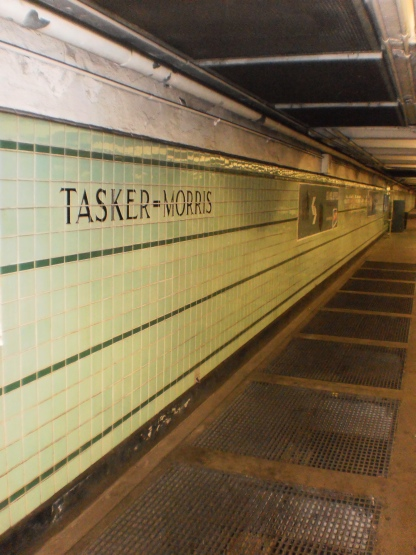
The mezzanine level of Tasker–Morris station, facing Morris Street.

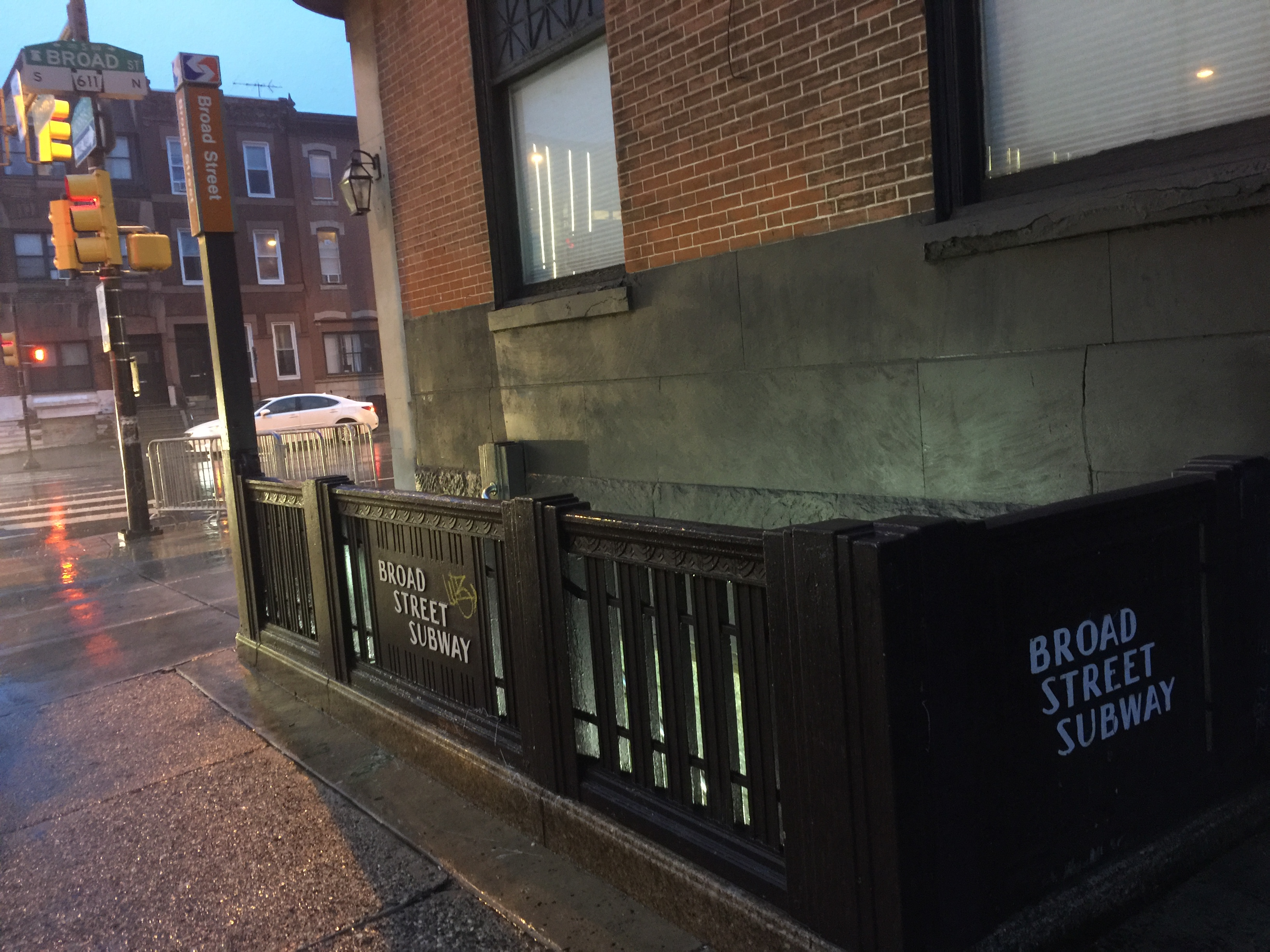
Station entrance
