= Chinatown station (SEPTA) =

Rapid transit station in Philadelphia

Chinatown 中國城
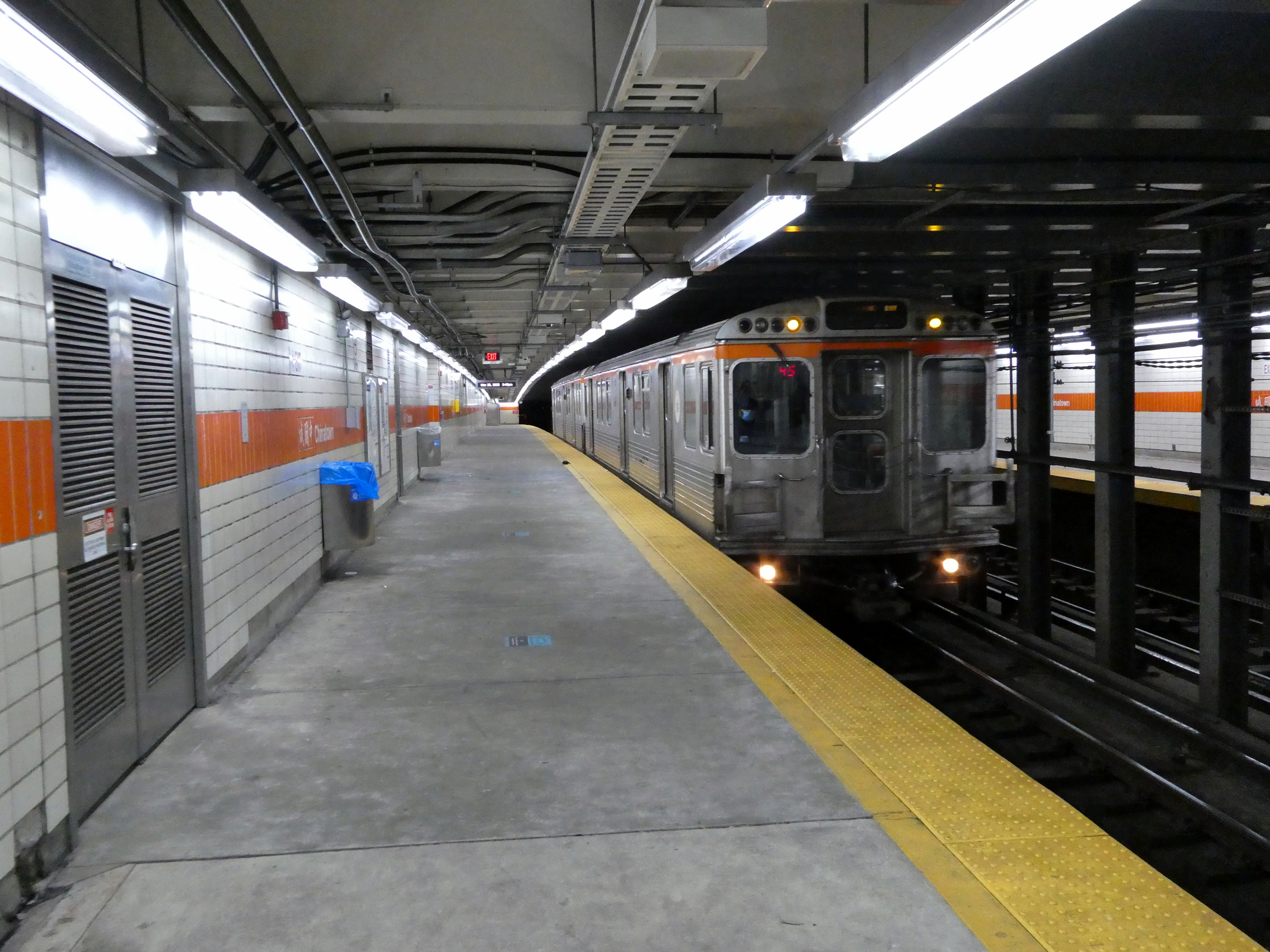
- A southbound train at Chinatown station in 2022

General information
- Location: 8th and Race Streets; Philadelphia, Pennsylvania
- Coordinates: 39.9550°N 75.1527°W
- Owner: City of Philadelphia
- Operator: SEPTA
- Platforms: 2 side platforms
- Tracks: 2
- Connections: SEPTA City Bus: 47, 61; NJ Transit Bus: 400, 401, 402, 404, 406, 408, 409, 410, 412

Construction
- Structure type: Underground
- Accessible: No, planned

History
- Opened: December 21, 1932

Services
Preceding station	SEPTA Metro	Following station
8th–Market Terminus	B (SEPTA Metro)	Fairmount toward Fern Rock T.C.
Former services
Preceding station	SEPTA	Following station
8th & Market Terminus	Broad–Ridge Spur	Spring Garden toward Olney or Fern Rock
Location

Chinatown station is an underground SEPTA Metro subway station in Philadelphia. It is located on the B's B3, and is located at the eastern edge of Philadelphia's Chinatown at 8th and Race Streets. Corresponding to the signage in the Chinatown neighborhood, the station name signs are written in Chinese in addition to English. The station has two side platforms. The station's fare gates are located at street level.

The station opened in 1932 as part of the Ridge–8th Street Subway as Vine.
