= Federal Road =

Federal Road may refer to:

- Federal Road (Cherokee lands) from Athens, Georgia to Chattanooga and Knoxville, Tennessee
- Federal Road (Creek lands) from Fort Wilkinson (close to Milledgeville, Georgia) to Fort Stoddert (close to Mobile, Alabama)
- Malaysian Federal Roads System
