= Ellsworth–Federal station =

Rapid transit station in Philadelphia

Ellsworth–Federal
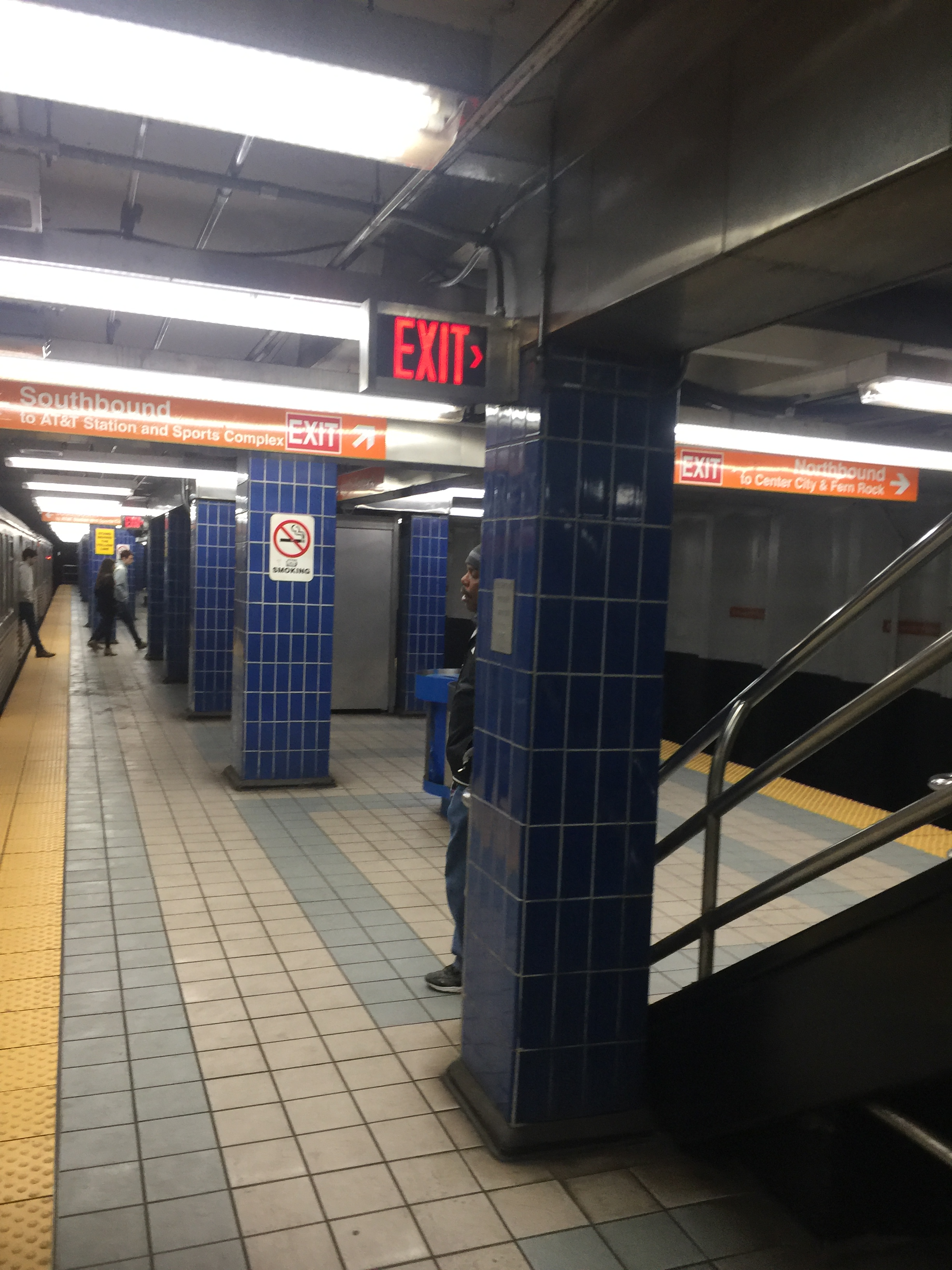
- Ellsworth–Federal station platform

General information
- Location: 1200 South Broad Street; Philadelphia, Pennsylvania
- Coordinates: 39.9358°N 75.1672°W
- Owner: City of Philadelphia
- Operator: SEPTA
- Platforms: 1 island platform
- Tracks: 2
- Connections: SEPTA City Bus: 4, 64

Construction
- Structure type: Underground
- Accessible: No, planned

History
- Opened: September 18, 1938

Services
Preceding station	SEPTA Metro	Following station
Tasker–Morris toward NRG Station	B (SEPTA Metro)	Lombard–South toward Fern Rock T.C.
(special events) does not stop here
Location

Ellsworth–Federal station is a subway station on the SEPTA Metro B in South Philadelphia, Pennsylvania. The station opened on September 18, 1938, and is located at the western edge of the Italian Market on Broad Street, between Ellsworth and Federal Streets. It is also close to the Washington Avenue Historic District. It is served by Broad Street Line local trains only, with one platform.

In addition to the Italian Market, the station also provides access to busy Washington Avenue (one block north of the Ellsworth exit) and, approximately five blocks east, the landmark competing cheesesteak vendors Geno's Steaks and Pat's King of Steaks.

== Station layout ==
There are four street entrances to the station, two at Broad and Ellsworth streets, as well as two at Broad and Federal streets.

== Gallery ==
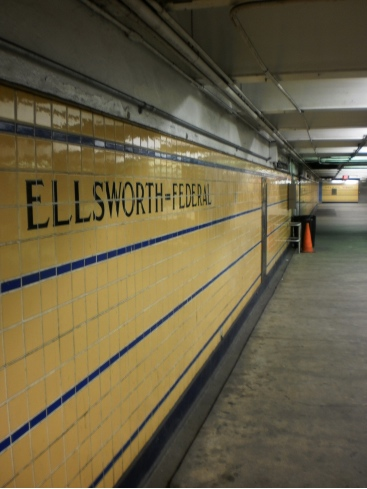
Ellsworth–Federal station with the two-toned tilework.

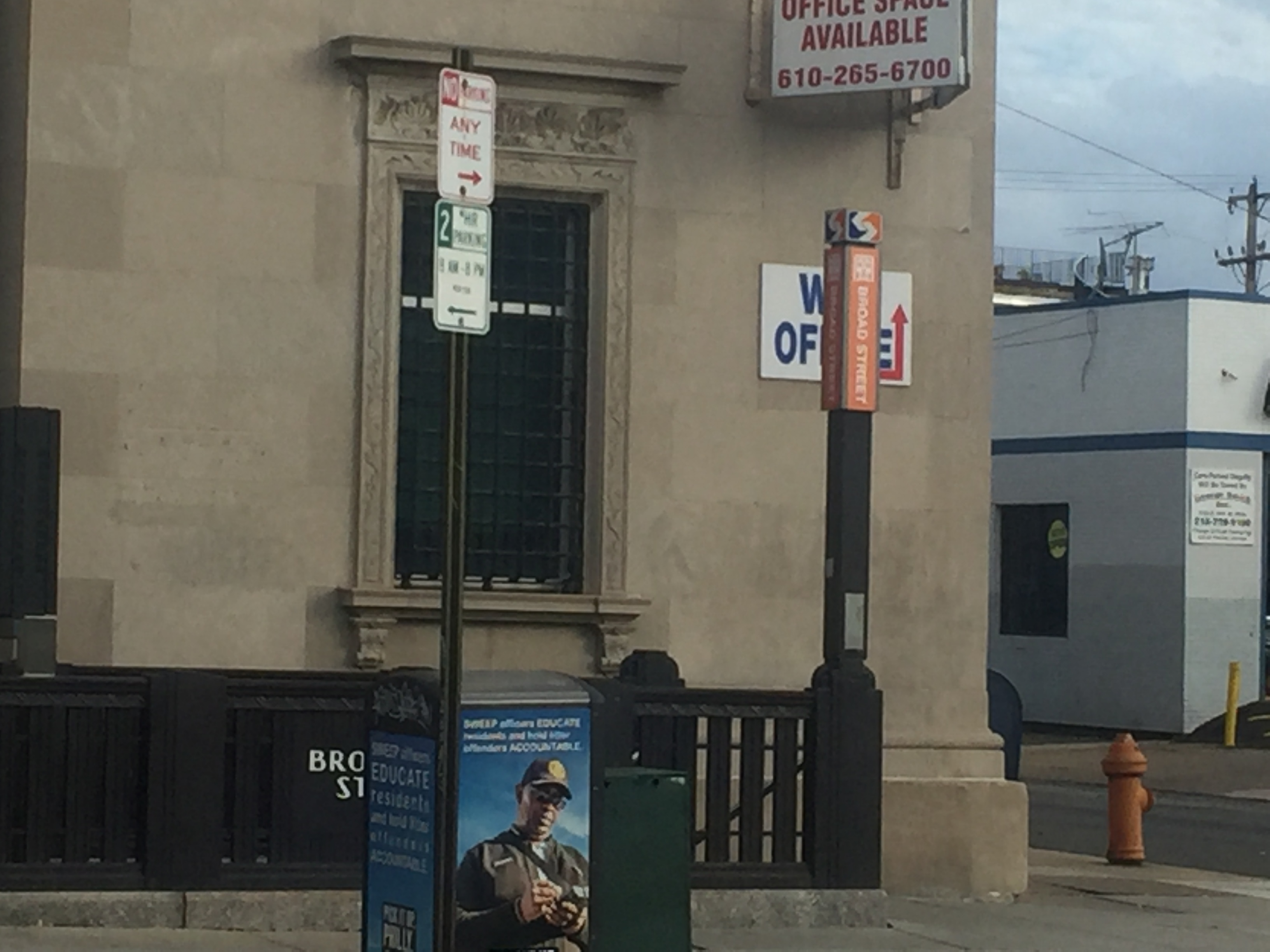
Station entrance
