= Huntingdon station (SEPTA) =

Rapid transit station in Philadelphia

Huntingdon
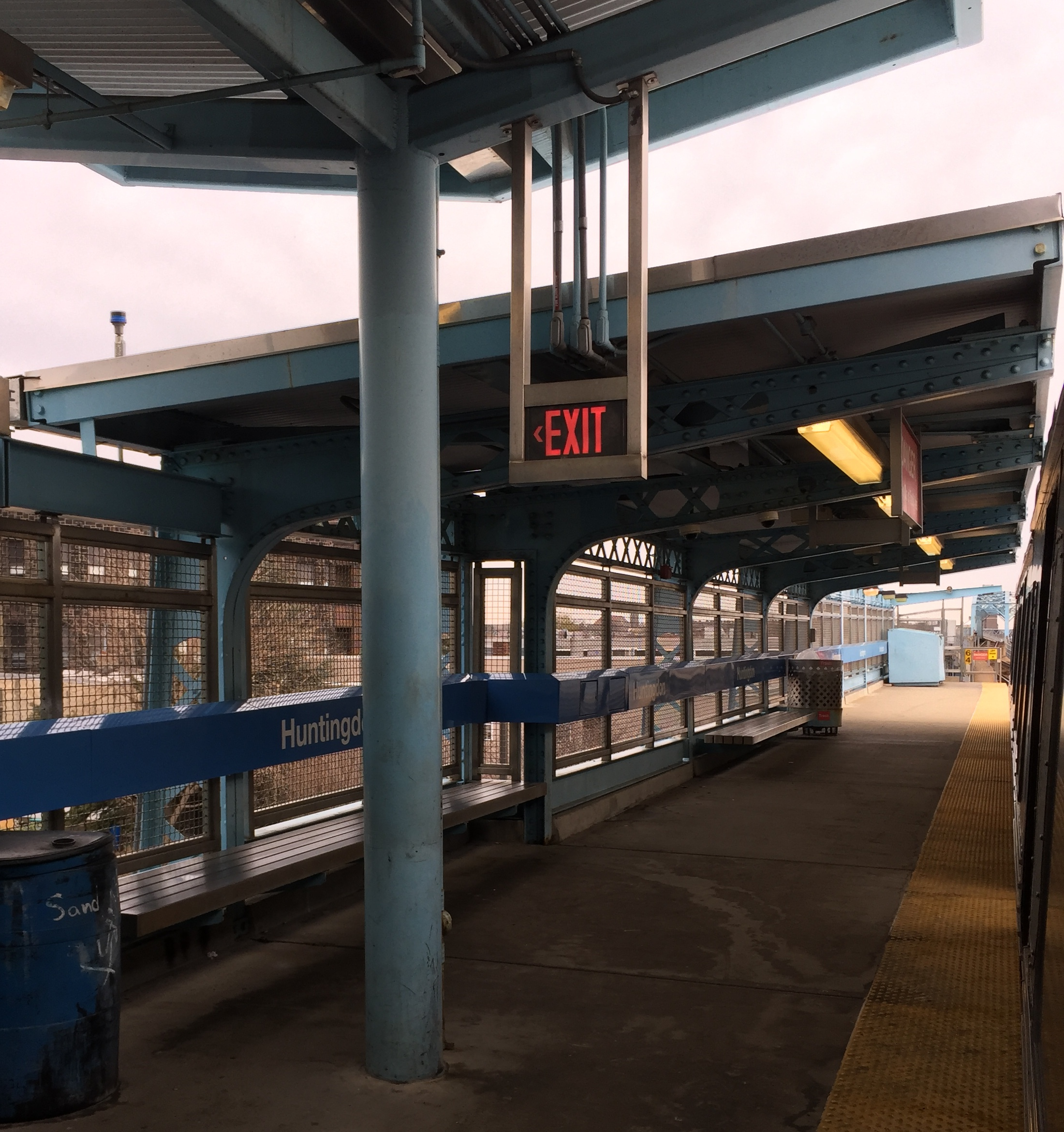
- Huntingdon station platform

General information
- Location: 2600 Kensington Avenue; Philadelphia, Pennsylvania
- Coordinates: 39°59′20″N 75°07′38″W
- Owner: City of Philadelphia
- Operator: SEPTA
- Platforms: 2 side platforms
- Tracks: 2
- Connections: SEPTA City Bus: 3, 39, 54

Construction
- Structure type: Elevated
- Accessible: Yes

History
- Opened: November 5, 1922
- Rebuilt: 1997

Services
| Preceding station | SEPTA Metro | Following station |
|---|---|---|
| York–Dauphin toward 69th Street T.C. | L (SEPTA Metro) | Somerset toward Frankford T.C. |
Location

Huntingdon station is an elevated rapid transit station in Philadelphia, Pennsylvania, serving SEPTA Metro L trains. It is located at the intersection of Kensington Avenue, Huntingdon Street, and B Street in the Kensington neighborhood of the city. It is the westernmost station on the line located above Kensington Avenue and is also served by SEPTA bus routes 3, 39, and 54.

== History ==
Huntingdon is part of the Frankford Elevated section of the line, which began service on November 5, 1922.

Between 1988 and 2003, SEPTA undertook a $493.3 million reconstruction of the 5.5-mile (8.9 km) Frankford Elevated. Huntingdon station was completely rebuilt on the site of the original station; the project included new platforms, elevators, windscreens, and overpasses, and the station now meets ADA accessibility requirements. The line had originally been built with track ballast and was replaced with precast sections of deck, allowing the station and the entire line to remain open throughout the project.

During the Market–Frankford's rush-hour skip-stop service pattern, Huntingdon was only served by "A" trains. This practice was discontinued on February 24, 2020.

== Station layout ==
Access to the station from street level is at the northwest corner of Kensington Avenue and B Street. There is also an exit-only staircase reaching the southeast corner of Kensignton Avenue and Huntingdon Street. East of the station, the tracks utilize a high truss bridge over a Conrail freight line.
