= Snyder station =

Rapid transit station in Philadelphia

Snyder
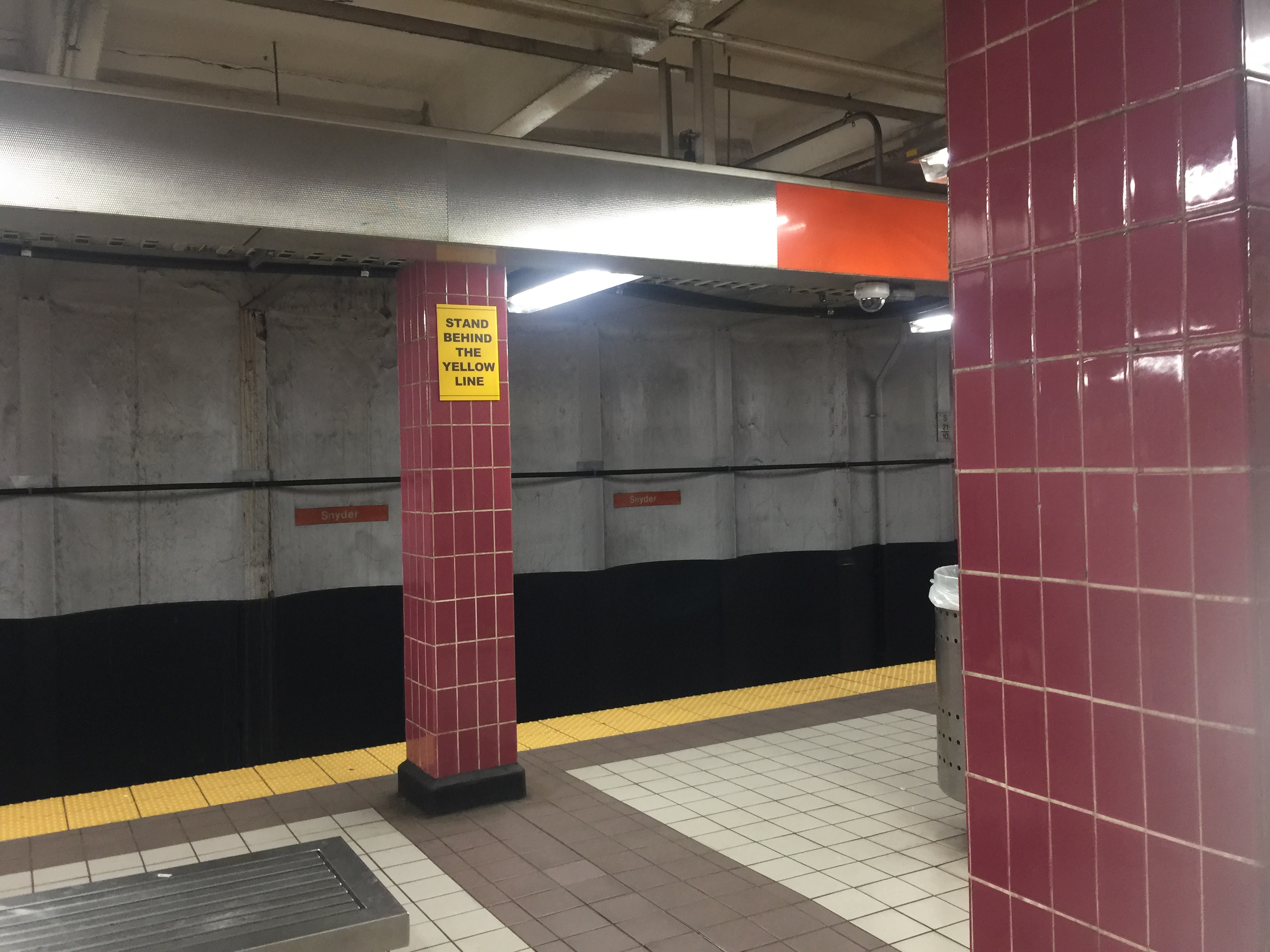

General information
- Location: 2100 South Broad Street; Philadelphia, Pennsylvania
- Coordinates: 39.9242°N 75.1697°W
- Owner: City of Philadelphia
- Operator: SEPTA
- Platforms: 1 island platform
- Tracks: 2
- Connections: SEPTA City Bus 4, 37, 79; Greyhound Lines

Construction
- Structure type: Underground
- Accessible: No, planned

History
- Opened: September 18, 1938

Services
Preceding station	SEPTA Metro	Following station
Oregon toward NRG Station	B (SEPTA Metro)	Tasker–Morris toward Fern Rock T.C.
(special events) does not stop here
Location

Snyder station is a rapid transit subway station on the SEPTA Metro B in South Philadelphia, Pennsylvania. It is located at 2100 South Broad Street (PA 611) in the Lower Moyamensing neighborhood and is named for Snyder Avenue.

Originally built in 1938, Snyder station was the southern terminus of the Broad Street Line until 1973, when it was extended to Pattison Station (now named NRG Station). A connection exists to the never-built Passyunk Avenue Spur. South Philadelphia High School and Methodist Hospital are located near the station.

== Station layout ==
There are four street entrances to the station, one at each corner of the intersection between Broad Street and Snyder Avenue. The southwest entrance has a covered canopy and is an exit-only staircase.

== Gallery ==
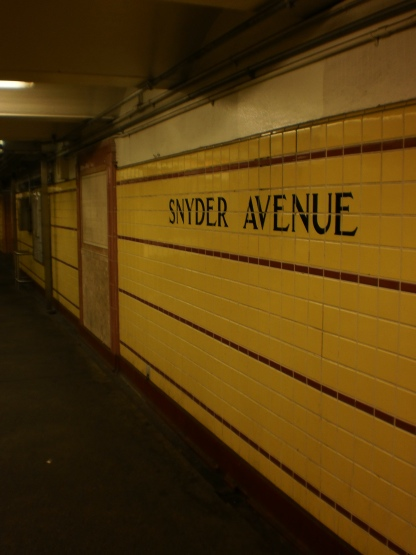
Snyder station tiles

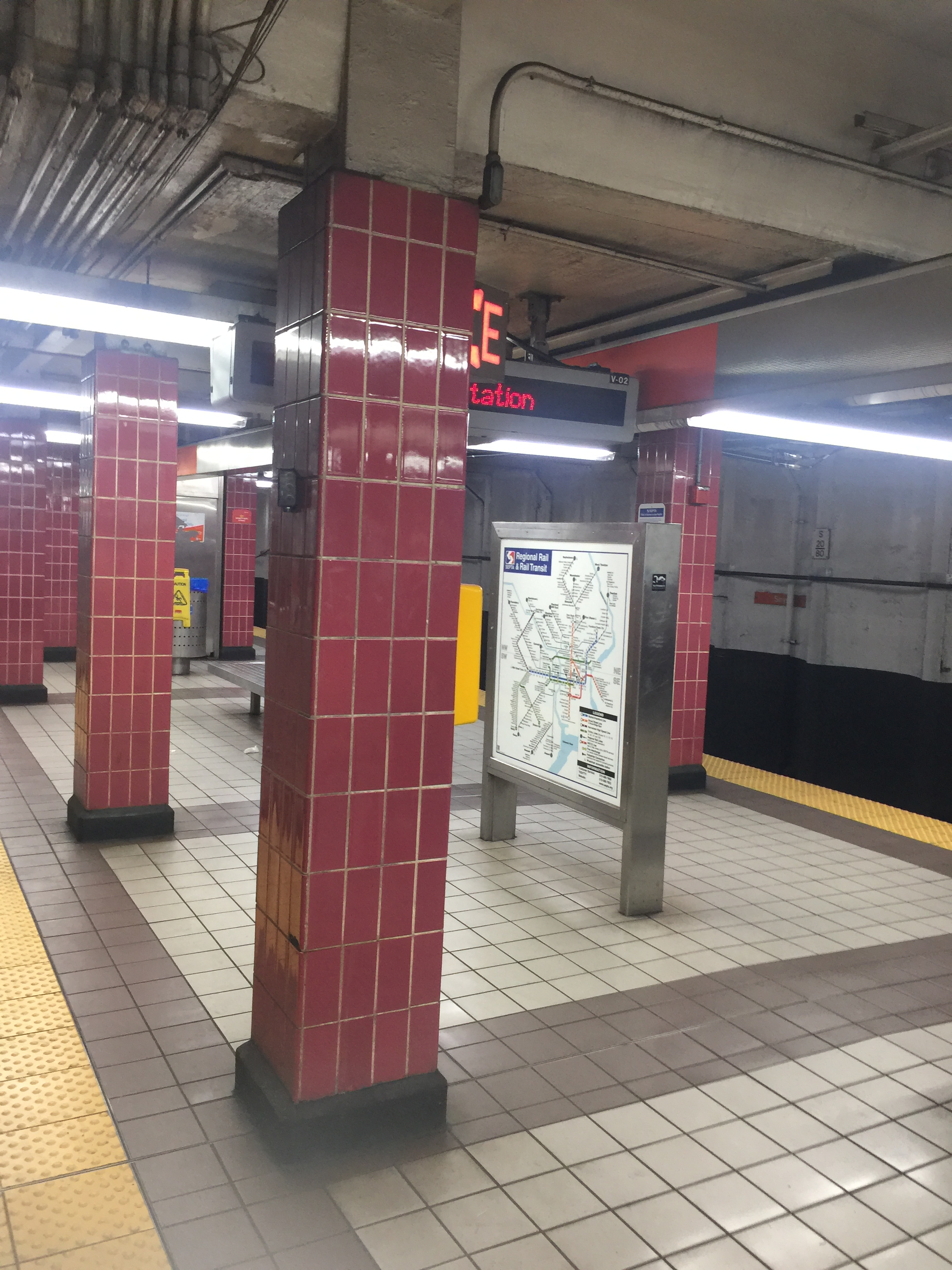
Station platform

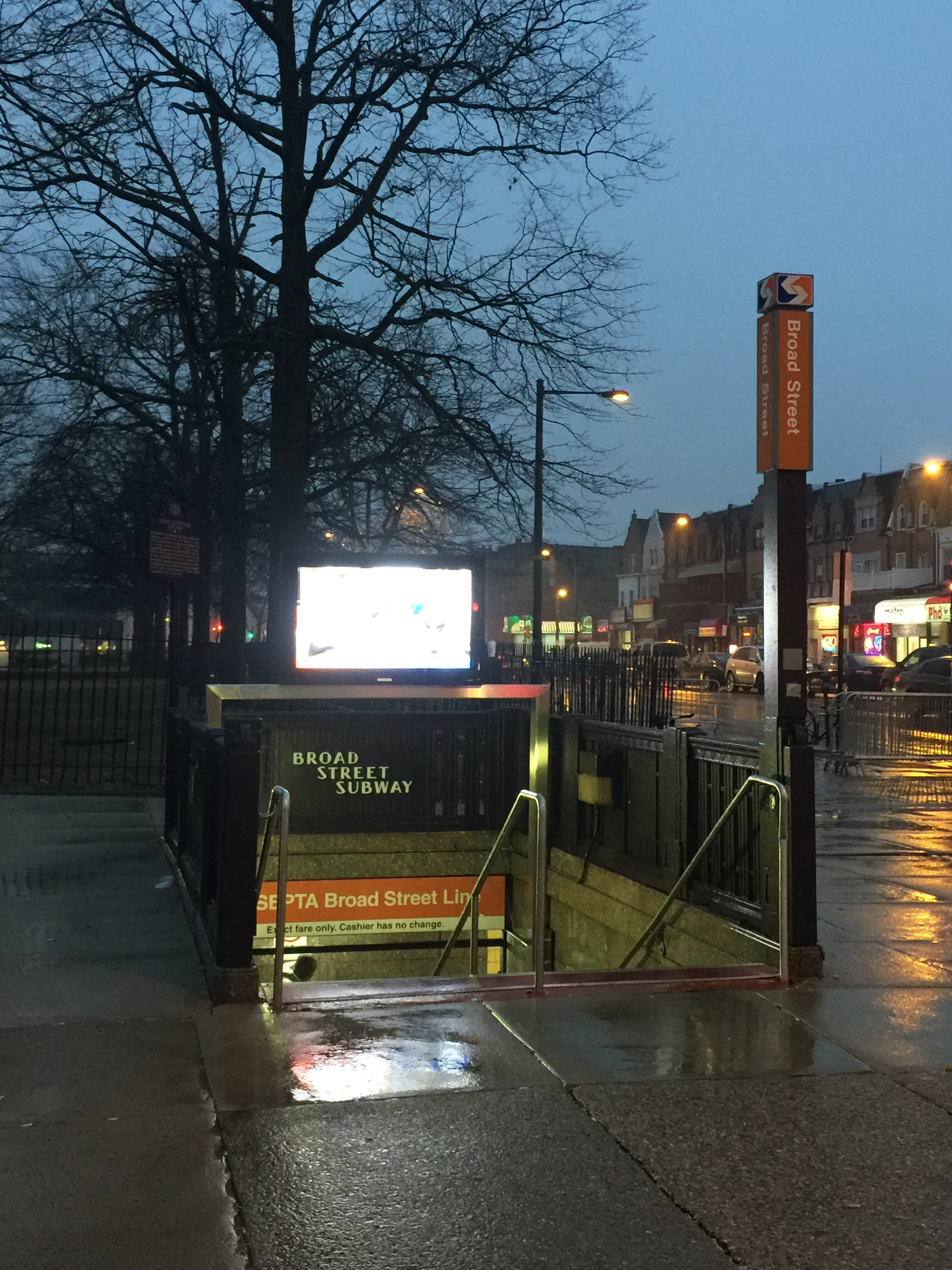
Station entrance
