= SEPTA Route 37 =

Public transit route in Philadelphia, US

Route 37

Overview
- System: Southern District
- Operator: SEPTA City Transit Division
- Former operator: Philadelphia Transportation Company

Route
- Locale: Philadelphia, Pennsylvania, U.S.
- Start: Broad Street and Snyder Avenue (Snyder station)
- Via: Passyunk Avenue, Lindbergh Boulevard, and Industrial Highway (PA 291)
- End: Chester Transit Center
- Length: 14.8 miles (23.8 km)

Service
- Frequency: 25 minutes (base), 10 minutes (am peak), 15 minutes (pm peak), hourly (night)
- Weekend frequency: same, without peak additions
- Ridership: 3,303 (daily ridership 2019)
- Annual patronage: 990,900 (2019)
- Timetable: Route 37 schedule

Route 37 is a bus and former streetcar route operated by SEPTA in Philadelphia, Pennsylvania.

== Route description ==
Starting at Snyder station on the Broad Street Line, the route follows Passyunk Avenue, 61st Street, Lindbergh Boulevard, and 84th Street. It then continues along Bartram Avenue, loops counterclockwise through Philadelphia International Airport, and takes Industrial Highway / PA 291 to Chester, with a short detour along Morton Avenue to Harrah's Philadelphia Casino & Racetrack, and then looping back out and taking local streets to get to the terminus at Chester Transit Center.

Some trips during rush hour operate to Chester via Eastwick Industrial Park via Essington Avenue, 70th Street, Holstein Avenue, 74th Street, Brewster Avenue, 78th Street, back on Holstein Avenue to Bartram Avenue just east of Island Avenue. They then continue down Bartram Avenue to 84th Street, where they pick up the regular routing. The reverse is done inbound to Snyder Station.

== History ==
=== Street car service ===
The original trolley service, nicknamed the "Chester Short Line", ran between Chester and 3rd & Jackson Streets in South Philadelphia. On February 15, 1911, the service was extended to Center City via the Subway-Surface tunnel.

The route ran from Chester via Essington Avenue (now Industrial Highway), through a swampy area (now the John Heintz-Tinicum Wildlife Refuge Center), along the former Eastwick Avenue, then turned up Island Road (now Island Avenue), and east onto Woodland Avenue where it joined Route 11 and 12. Overnight service operated via Elmwood Avenue instead of Woodland, replacing Route 36 between Island Road and 49th Street.

During World War II, Route 37 carried thousands of industrial workers to jobs at Westinghouse Electric, the Baldwin Locomotive Works, and Sun Shipbuilding. Six special shift-change branches ran to and from Sun Shipbuilding (37A, 37B, 37C and 37D) and Westinghouse (37E and 37F) from destinations not on the regular Route 37.

=== Bus service ===
At 1:18 a.m. on August 28, 1946, a crowded trolley collided with a truck on the Crum Creek Bridge. Both vehicles caught fire; fortunately all the passengers escaped without injury. However, the bridge was destroyed, severing the trolley line to Chester. Buses replaced trolleys between Westinghouse Loop (Lester Road) and Chester. The remainder of the route was converted to bus operation on November 5, 1955. The new service ran to Snyder station in South Philadelphia instead of Center City, replacing the Route 81 bus on Passyunk Avenue. Trolley service between Center City and Westinghouse Loop was transferred to Route 36.

In the mid-1970s, due to Airport expansion and construction of I-95, service in the Airport area was rerouted via Lindbergh Boulevard, 84th Street and Bartram Avenue. New peak hour service was introduced to the Eastwick Industrial Park on June 21, 1981, and then rerouted past the nearby Auto Mall on September 9, 1990. Service to the PNC Eastwick Center began on September 13, 1998. A stop for Harrah's Philadelphia (the former site of Sun Shipbuilding) was added on September 3, 2006.
