= Lower Moyamensing, Philadelphia =

Neighborhood in Philadelphia, US

Lower Moyamensing
- Neighborhood of Philadelphia
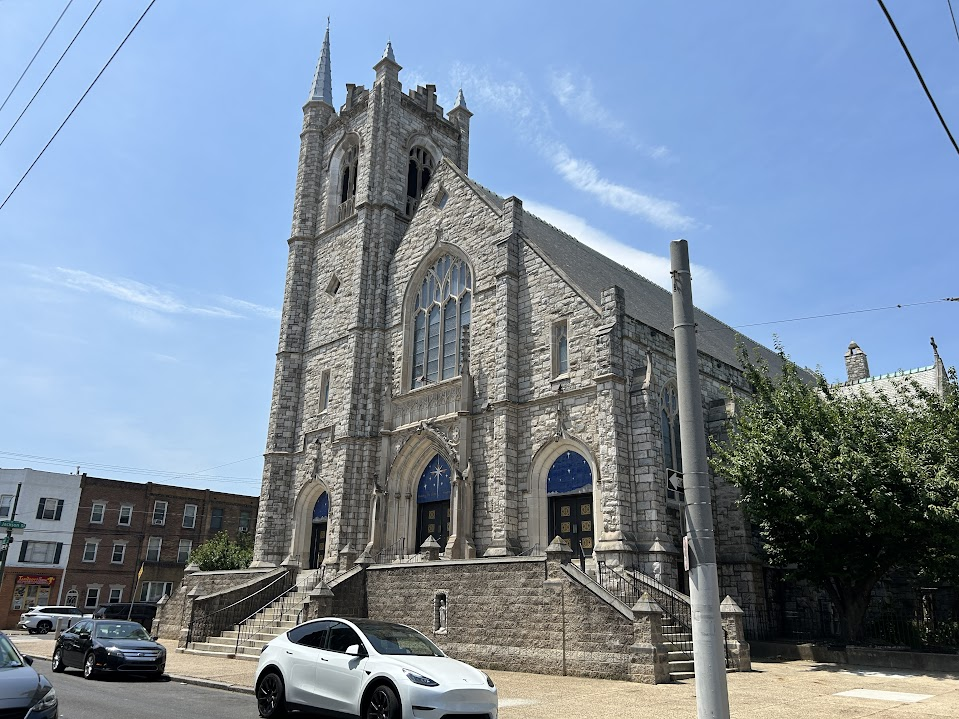
- Epiphany of Our Lord Catholic Church, founded in 1891, located on the corner of South 11th and Jackson Streets

- Location within Philadelphia
- Country: United States
- State: Pennsylvania
- County: Philadelphia
- City: Philadelphia
- Area codes: 215, 267 and 445

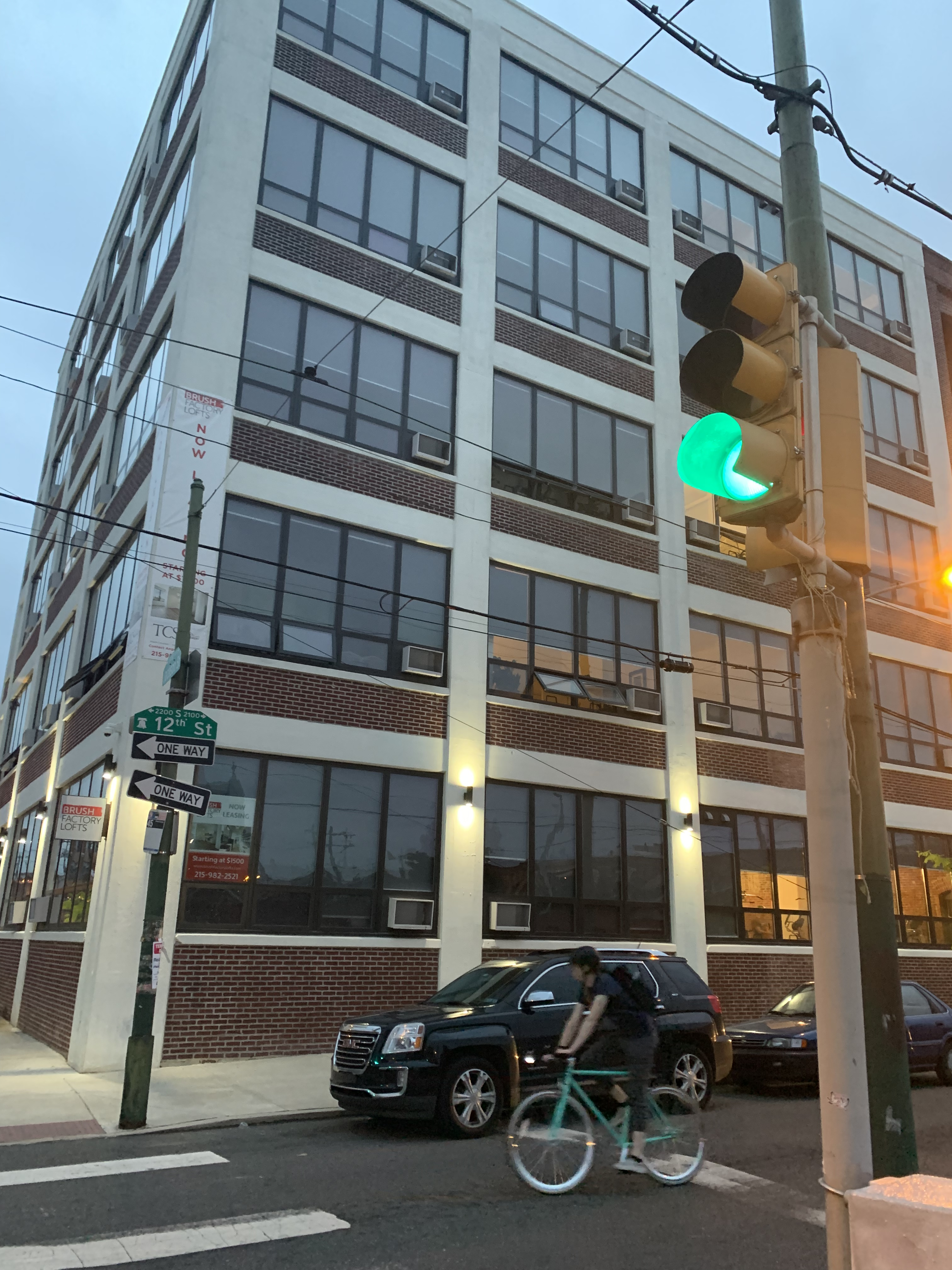
Brush Factory Lofts, 12th and Jackson Streets

Lower Moyamensing is a neighborhood in South Philadelphia, Pennsylvania, United States, situated just south of the East Passyunk Crossing neighborhood and north of the stadium area. It is bounded by Snyder Avenue to the north, Oregon Avenue to the south, South 7th Street to the east, and South Broad Street to the west. Sub-divided by 10th Street, it can be separated into LoMo East and LoMo West. The neighborhood was once part of Moyamensing Township (later East Moyamensing) before becoming part of Philadelphia in 1854. Lower Moyamensing is known for its 19th century row homes, factory buildings, and variety of restaurants. South Philadelphia High School is located in Lower Moyamensing, at the corner of Broad and Jackson Streets.

== Demographics ==
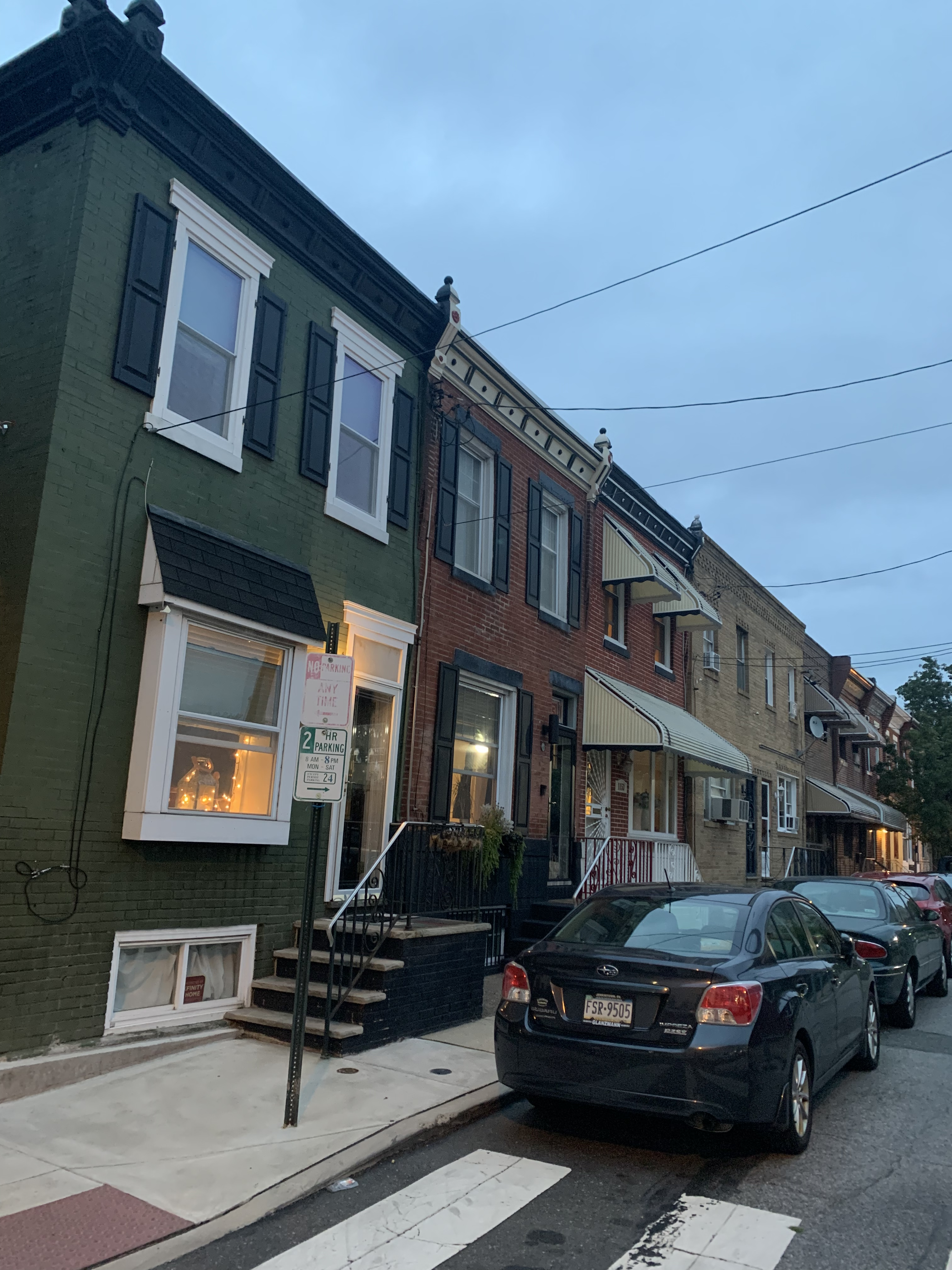
Row homes in Lower Moyamensing

According to the 2020 Census data, the population of Lower Moyamensing is just over 16,000. 54.1% of the population identified as White, 25% as Asian, 4.9% as Black, 4.7% as mixed race, and 11.2% having Hispanic heritage. 73.8% of the population was born in the United States, of the foreign born population, 57.8% were born in Asia. The median household income is $63,497.

== Parks ==
- Marconi Plaza
- Mifflin Square Park, established in the 1890s
- South Philly High Park, established in 2022.

== Transportation ==
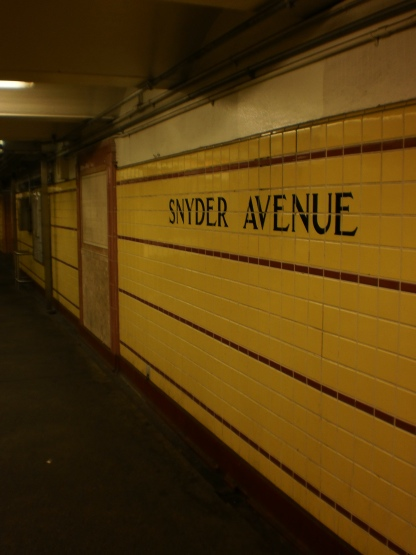
Snyder station in Lower Moyamensing

Lower Moyamensing is served by SEPTA's B-line (formerly named Broad Street Line) subway at Snyder station at the northern border and Oregon Station at the southern border, as well as several bus lines. Broad Street is the major north south roadway, Snyder Avenue and Oregon Avenue are the major east west roadways. Towards to North and South, the LoMo West is served by SEPTA bus Route 4, 45. The east side is served by Route 47M and 47. Towards East and West, the neighborhood is served by Route 79,7,63. The neighborhood is also served by Route 37 and 68 to Airport Area and 69th Street Transportation Center.

== Hospitals ==
Methodist Hospital, part of the Jefferson University hospital network, is located on Broad and Wolf Streets.

== In popular culture ==
- In the 1976 film Rocky, the "Little Marie" scene is set at a deli (now a private residence) at the corner of South 12th and Cantrell Streets, and the 1100 Block of Jackson.
- M. Night Shyamalan's 2019 film Glass contains a scene filmed at Snyder Station on the Broad Street Line.
- The 2006 film 10th & Wolf is set in Lower Moyamensing, although it was filmed in Pittsburgh.

== Notable people ==
- Angelo Bruno (1910–1980), mobster, boss of the Philadelphia Crime Family
- Jerry Blavat (1940–2023), disc jockey and performer.
- James Darren (1936–2024), actor
- Fabian (born 1943), singer
- Joey Giardello (1930–2008), boxer
- Anne Ishii (born 1979), writer, television host
- Bobby Rydell (1942–2022), singer
- Lisa Scottoline (born 1955), author
- Scott Stewart (1802–1881), physician, founder of Methodist Hospital
