= Oregon station =

Rapid transit station in Philadelphia

Oregon
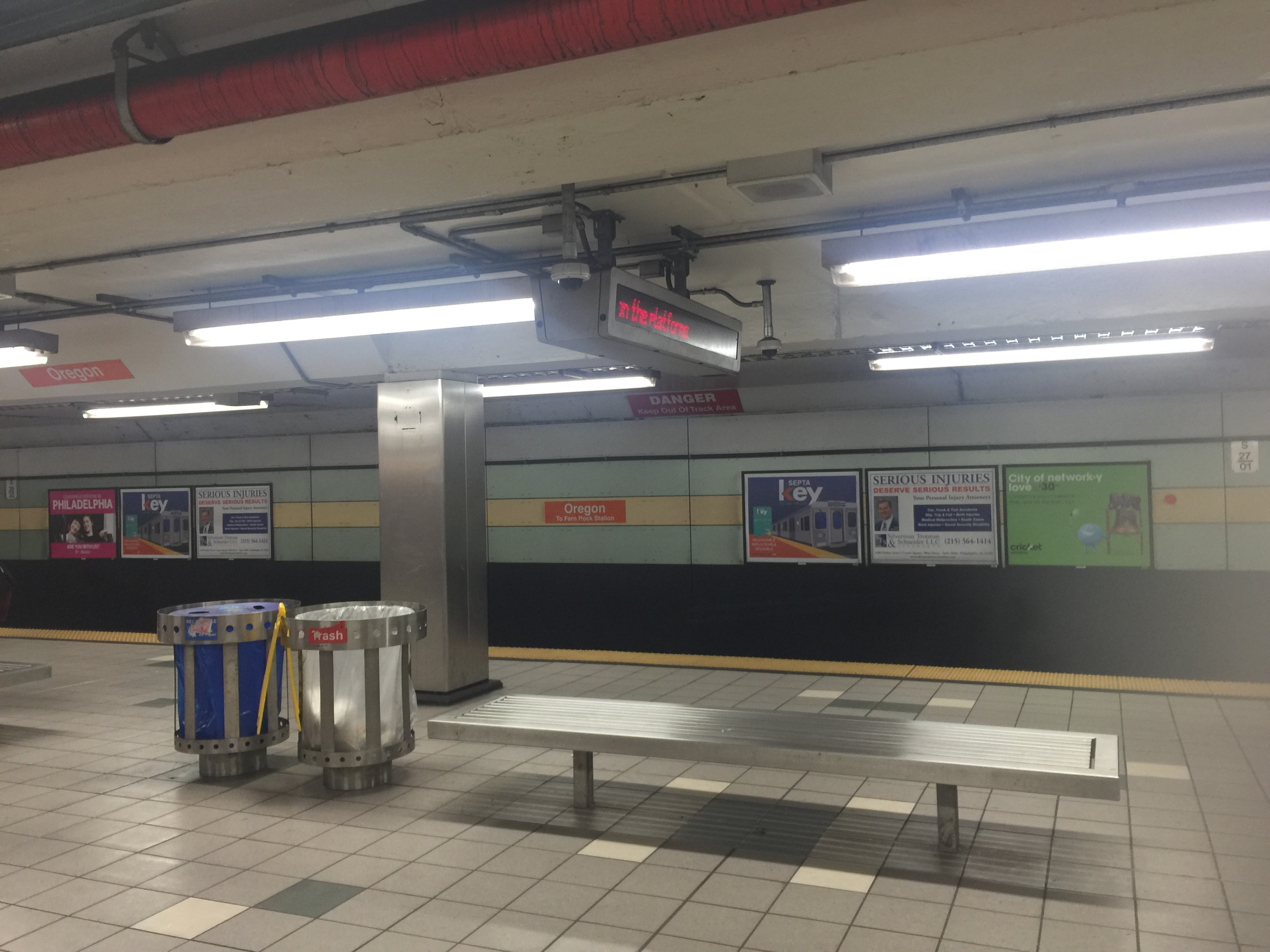

General information
- Location: 2700 South Broad Street; Philadelphia, Pennsylvania
- Coordinates: 39.9168°N 75.1713°W
- Owner: City of Philadelphia
- Operator: SEPTA
- Platforms: 1 island platform
- Tracks: 2
- Connections: SEPTA City Bus: 4, 7, 63, 68

Construction
- Structure type: Underground
- Accessible: Yes

History
- Opened: April 8, 1973

Services
Preceding station	SEPTA Metro	Following station
NRG Station Terminus	B (SEPTA Metro)	Snyder toward Fern Rock T.C.
(special events) does not stop here
Location

Oregon station is a rapid transit subway station on the SEPTA Metro B. It is located at 2700 South Broad Street (PA 611) at the intersection of Oregon Avenue in the Marconi Plaza neighborhood of South Philadelphia, Pennsylvania, and is the last stop before the southern terminus of the line. Oregon station opened on April 8, 1973 on the north side of Marconi Park.

== Station layout ==
Access to the station is via two station houses on northeast and southeast corners of Broad Street and Oregon Avenue. Like the neighboring NRG Station, Oregon station fare control barriers are at street level.

== Gallery ==
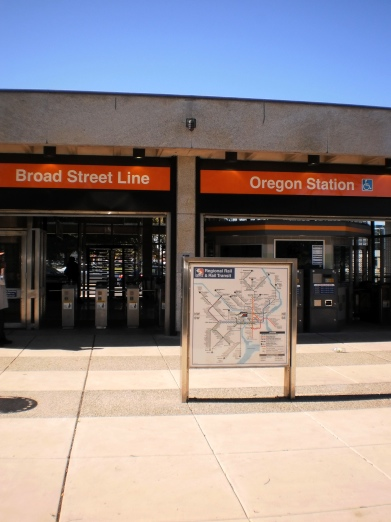
Station entrance

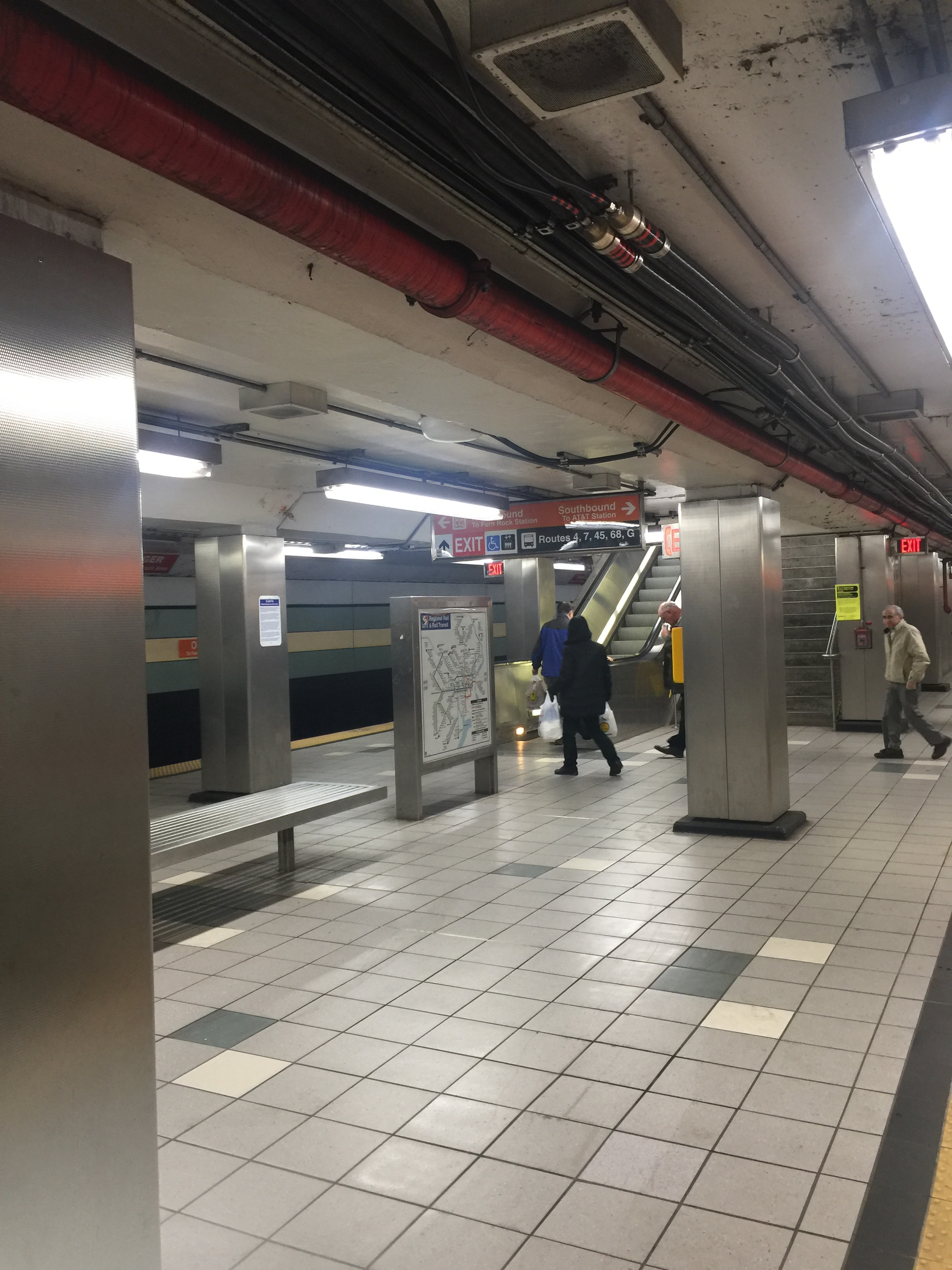
Station platform
