= NRG Station =

Rapid transit station in Philadelphia, U.S.

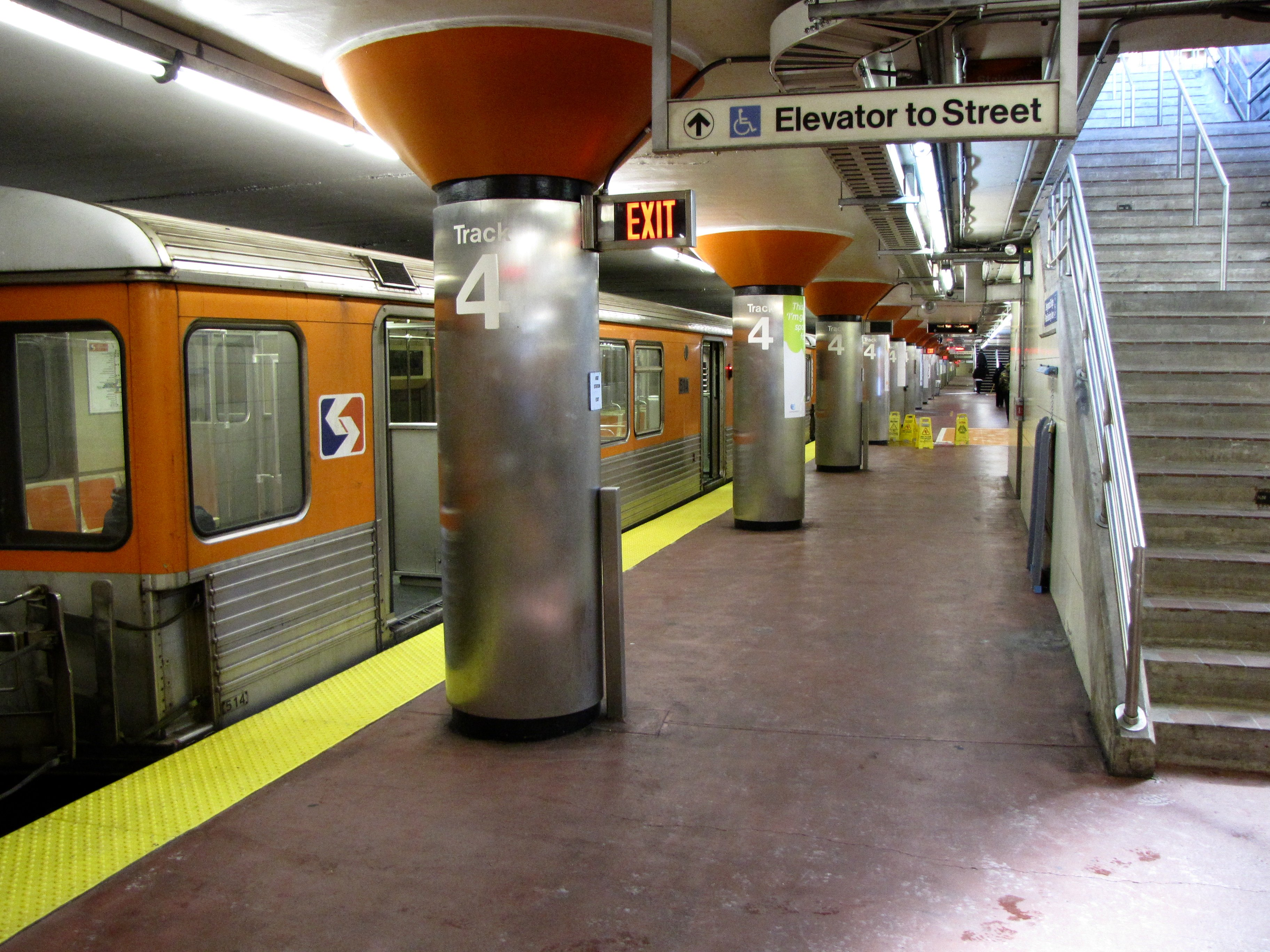
- NRG Station platform

General information
- Location: 3600 South Broad Street; Philadelphia, Pennsylvania
- Coordinates: 39.9054°N 75.1732°W
- Owner: City of Philadelphia
- Operator: SEPTA
- Platforms: 2 island platforms
- Tracks: 4
- Connections: SEPTA City Bus: 4, 45, 68

Construction
- Structure type: Underground
- Accessible: Yes

History
- Opened: April 8, 1973
- Former names: Pattison (1973–2010); AT&T Station (2010–2018)

Passengers
- 4,295 Boardings (FY 2018) (weekday average)

Services
Preceding station	SEPTA Metro	Following station
Terminus	B (SEPTA Metro)	Oregon toward Fern Rock T.C.
Terminus	special events	Walnut–Locust toward Fern Rock T.C.
Location

NRG Station (formerly named AT&T Station, and earlier Pattison station) is the southern terminus of the SEPTA Metro B, located at 3600 South Broad Street, at the intersection with Pattison Avenue in the South Philadelphia area of Philadelphia, Pennsylvania. The station's naming rights were sold to NRG Energy in 2018. Previously, naming rights were sold to AT&T for eight years.

NRG Station is located within short walking distance of the South Philadelphia Sports Complex, providing access to Citizens Bank Park, Lincoln Financial Field, Xfinity Mobile Arena, and Stateside Live!, the home venues of Philadelphia's four main professional sports teams – the Phillies, Flyers, 76ers, and Eagles, as well as the Temple University football team and select games of the Villanova University men's basketball team.

All local Broad Street Line trains serve the station. SEPTA often operates special "Sports Express" trains before and after large events. These trains run nonstop between NRG Station and Walnut–Locust station and make express stops north to Fern Rock Transit Center. The station has a park and ride lot not operated by SEPTA; it is used for stadium parking during sporting events.

== History ==
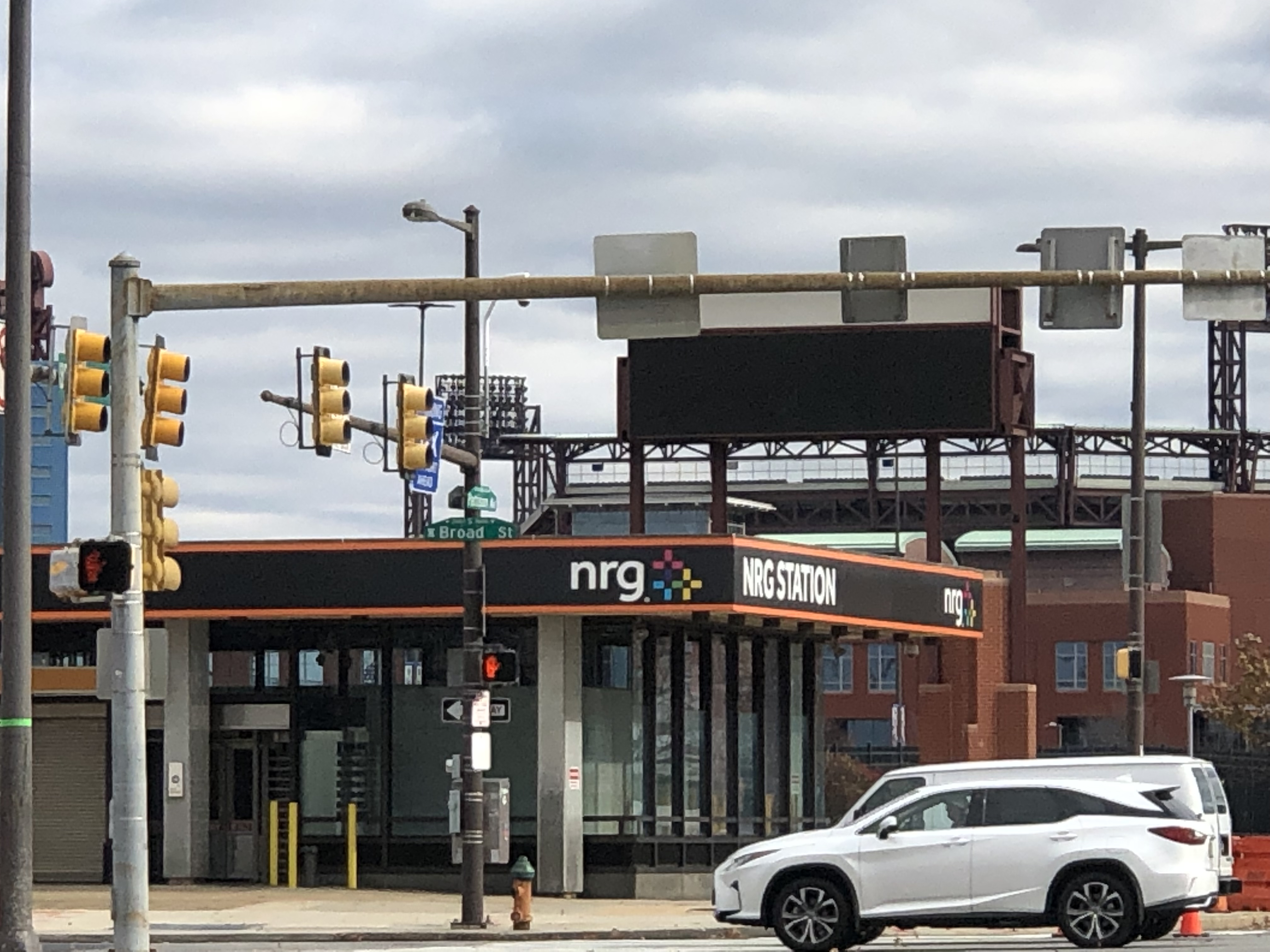
NRG Station house with Citizens Bank Park in the background

Pattison station opened for service on April 8, 1973, as one of the last two stations of the Broad Street subway to open, the other being the neighboring Oregon station. The original line, which dates back to 1928, ran from Olney to 15th Street/City Hall. From 1938 until this station's opening, the line terminated at Snyder station. The two-station extension was built at a cost of $37 million in 1973 dollars.

=== Renaming ===
On June 17, 2010, the station was renamed "AT&T Station." Naming rights were sold to AT&T for five years at a cost of $5 million; SEPTA netted $3 million, while the agency's advertising contractor Titan Outdoor (now Intersection) received the remaining $2 million. The costs for renaming – included changing of all mentions of the station throughout the line to "AT&T Station and Sports Complex" – were covered by the $3 million. The initial contract was later extended for an additional three years.

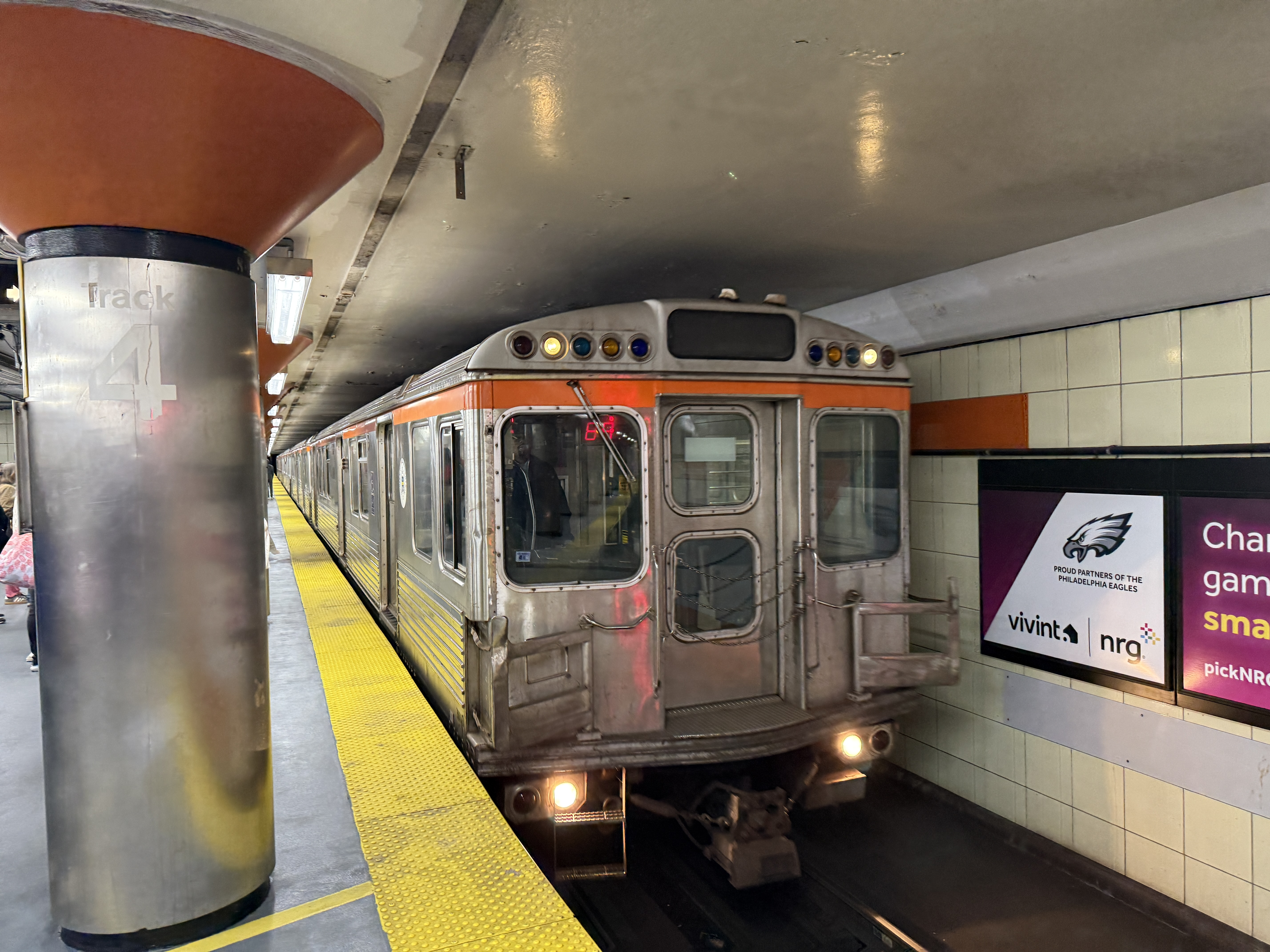
Southbound B1 train arriving at station

On July 25, 2018, SEPTA announced that NRG Energy had agreed to a five-year contract for the station's naming rights, paying $5.25 million. The name change to NRG Station took effect on August 1 and was inaugurated on August 14. Intersection received 15% of this contract, or about $800,000. It cost about $150,000 to change around 7,000 signs in the SEPTA system to reflect the name change, as well as $97,000 to reprint 6,000 route maps. The contract also allows NRG to set up marketing tables in SEPTA stations, as well as rentable portable phone chargers in this station.

== Station layout ==
Much like Oregon station, NRG Station has its fare control barriers at four street-level headhouses, all located on the east side of Broad Street. The station has an unusually wide and long island platform, long enough to hold multiple trains, to accommodate crush capacity crowds that occur regularly after events at the Sports Complex. There is an additional, infrequently-used platform on a level immediately beneath the regular service platform which is visible from the gated stairways along the length of the platform.
