= York–Dauphin station =

Rapid transit station in Philadelphia

York–Dauphin
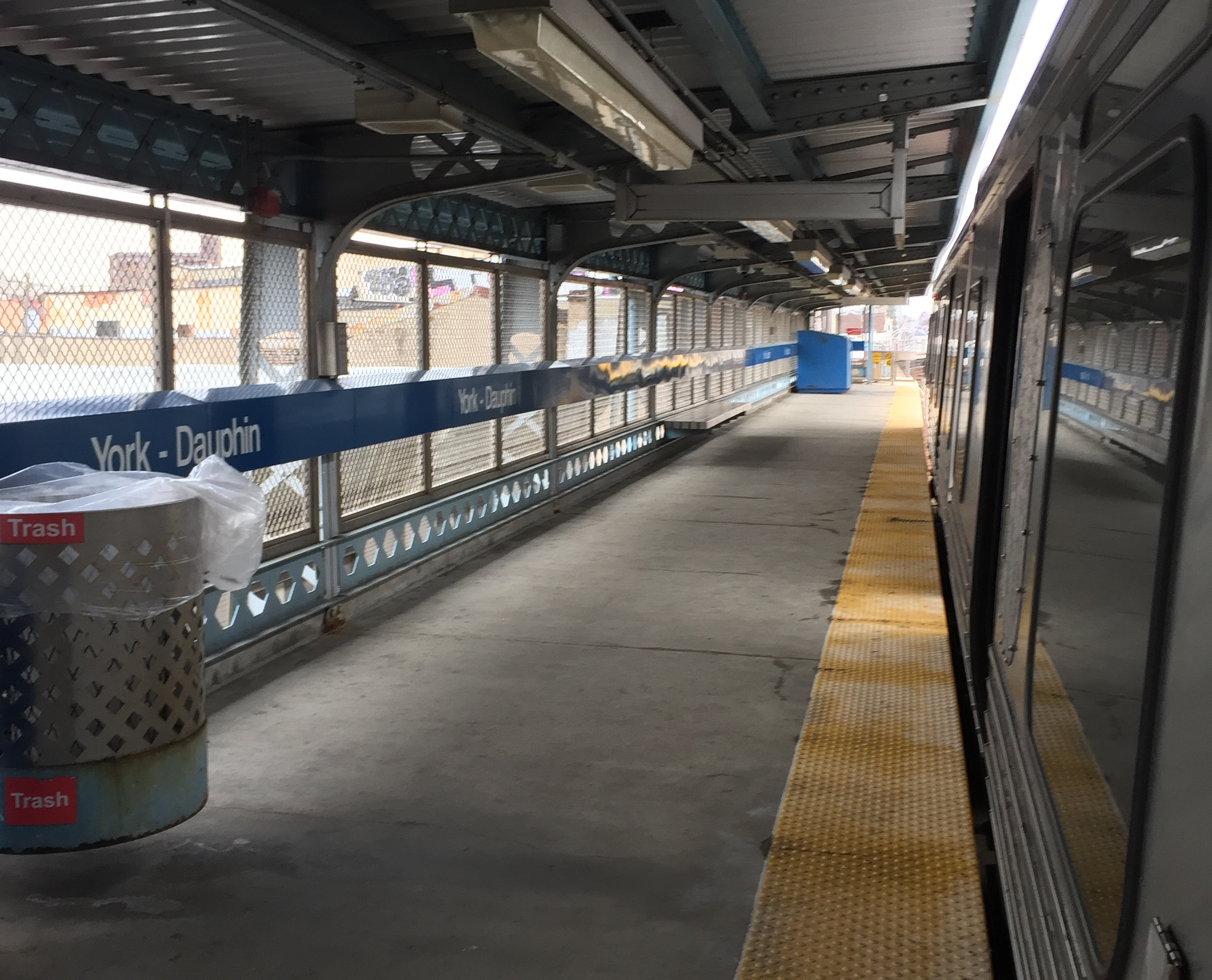
- York–Dauphin station platform

General information
- Location: 2300 North Front Street; Philadelphia, Pennsylvania
- Coordinates: 39°59′06″N 75°07′56″W
- Owner: City of Philadelphia
- Operator: SEPTA
- Platforms: 2 side platforms
- Tracks: 2
- Connections: SEPTA City Bus: 3, 39

Construction
- Structure type: Elevated
- Accessible: Yes

History
- Opened: November 5, 1922
- Rebuilt: 1997
- Former names: Dauphin–York

Services
Preceding station	SEPTA Metro	Following station
Berks toward 69th Street T.C.	L (SEPTA Metro)	Huntingdon toward Frankford T.C.
Location

York–Dauphin station is an elevated rapid transit station, serving L trains of SEPTA Metro. It is located in the Kensington neighborhood of Philadelphia, Pennsylvania. The station is located at the intersection of Dauphin, Jasper, and Front Streets. it is the easternmost station running above Front Street; east of the station the line turns onto Kensington Avenue heading towards Frankford.

York–Dauphin is also a transfer point for SEPTA buses, serving routes 3 and 39.

== History ==
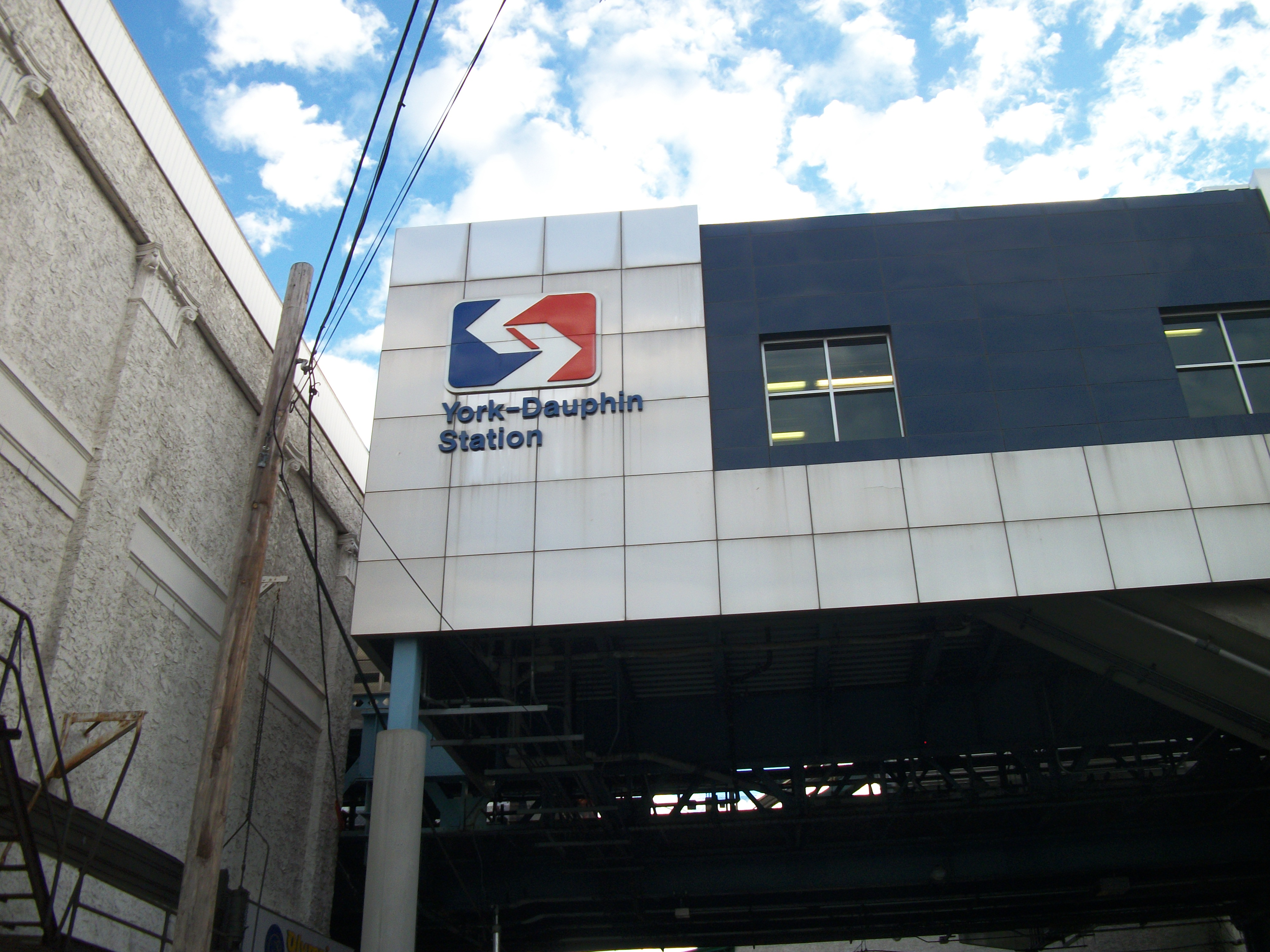
The reconstructed station, as seen from Dauphin Street

York–Dauphin is part of the Frankford Elevated section of the line, which began service on November 5, 1922.

On December 26, 1961, two cars were wrecked in a derailment at the York-Dauphin Station, killing one passenger. The accident occurred on the curve, at York and Front Street, right before the York-Dauphin stop, just north of the station. The four-car southbound train went into a curve and hit a guardrail. The first three cars slid off the tracks as it crashed into York-Dauphin Station. The accident had occurred during the Budd Company's replacement of the original 315 Market–Frankford Line cars with 270 new ones.

Between 1988 and 2003, SEPTA undertook a $493.3 million reconstruction of the 5.5-mile (8.9 km) Frankford Elevated. York–Dauphin station was completely rebuilt on the site of the original station; the project included new platforms, elevators, windscreens, and overpasses, and the station now meets ADA accessibility requirements. The line had originally been built with track ballast and was replaced with precast sections of slab track, allowing the station (and the entire line) to remain open throughout the project.

During the Market–Frankford's rush-hour skip-stop service pattern, York–Dauphin was only served by "B" trains . This practice was discontinued on February 24, 2020.

== Station layout ==
The station's entrance is on the south side of Dauphin Street, between Hope and Front streets. There is also an exit-only staircase from the eastbound platform to the southeast corner of York and Front streets.
