= SEPTA City Transit Division surface routes =

Transit routes in Pennsylvania, US

SEPTA City Transit Division

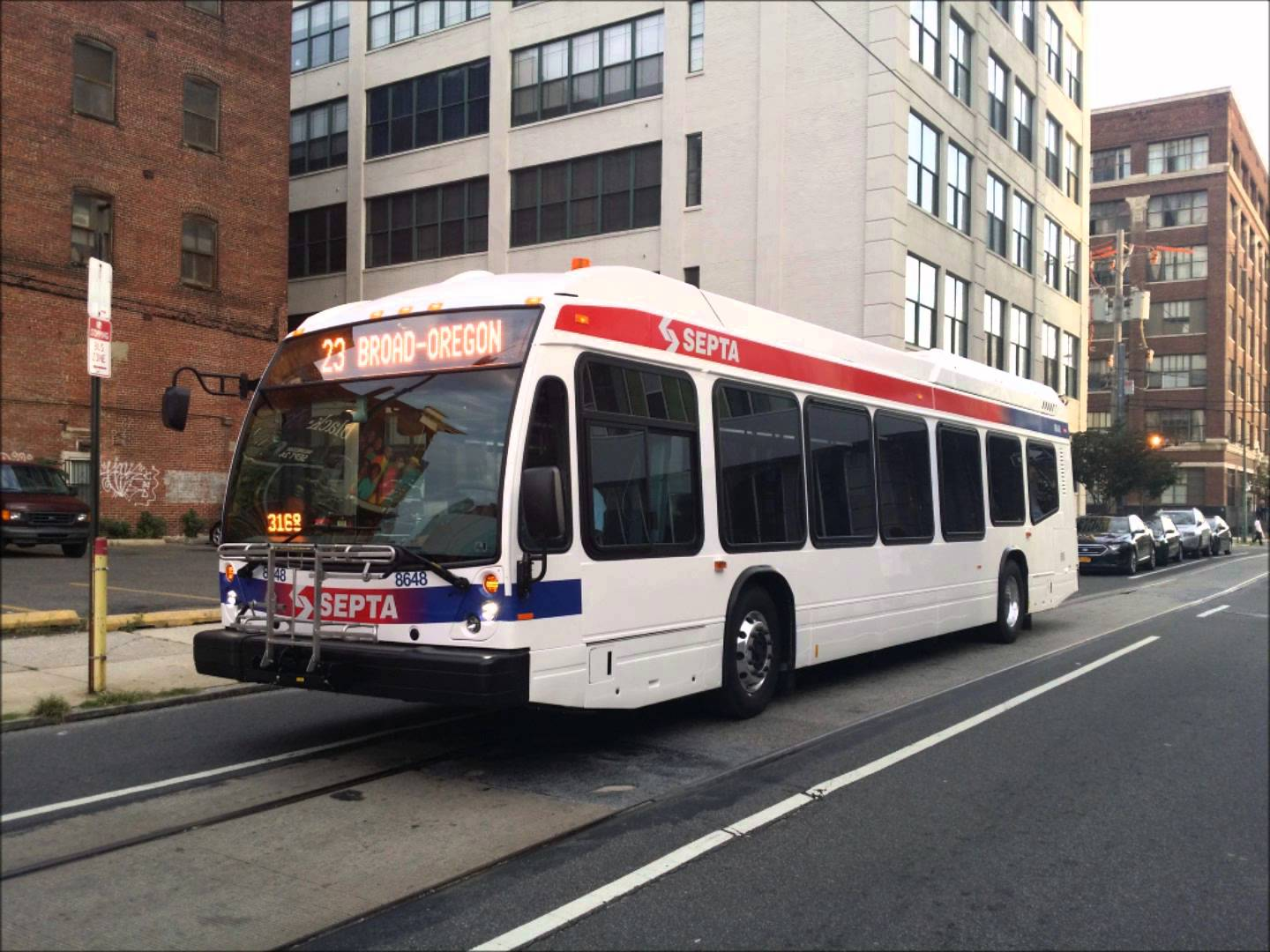
- SEPTA NovaBus LFS HEV #8648 waits at 12th & Vine Streets in Center City Philadelphia
- Parent: SEPTA
- Founded: 1968
- Headquarters: 1234 Market Street, Philadelphia, Pennsylvania
- Locale: Philadelphia
- Service area: Philadelphia and immediate vicinity
- Service type: Local bus service
- Routes: 79
- Fleet: 977
- Operator: SEPTA
- Chief executive: Scott A. Sauer (General Manager)
- Website: septa.org

The City Transit Division of the Southeastern Pennsylvania Transportation Authority (SEPTA) operate almost all of Philadelphia's public transit, including all six trolley, three trackless trolley, and 70 bus lines within city limits. Some of the bordering municipalities are served by the City Transit division, despite not being part of the city. For example, Cheltenham Township has 13 city division routes and no Suburban Division ones. The City Transit division also operates the 400 Series routes which are designed to serve students attending schools in the city of Philadelphia.

The City Transit Division is broken down into seven districts (Allegheny, Callowhill, Comly, Elmwood, Frankford, Midvale, and Southern) and Contract Operations.

== History ==
=== 19th century ===
Transit in Philadelphia began with multiple independent horse car, cable, and traction companies, including the privately established entities: Philadelphia Passenger Railway Company, the Thirteenth & Fifteenth Street Passenger Railway Company, West Philadelphia Passenger Railway Company, etc.

In 1895, these companies began amalgamating into three large operations: the Electric Traction Company, the People's Traction Company, and the Philadelphia Transportation Company (PTC). The following year they consolidated as the Union Traction Company (UTC). In 1902 UTC went bankrupt; it was reorganized as the Philadelphia Rapid Transit Company (PRT) on July 1.

=== 20th century ===
In 1939, despite efforts by Thomas E. Mitten, PRT went bankrupt. A new Philadelphia Transportation Company was formed in 1940 to assume PRT's business. National City Lines (NCL) took over management of the PTC on March 1, 1955, and began a program of converting streetcar lines to bus routes. SEPTA was created in 1962, and purchased PTC's transit operations on September 30, 1968. The former Philadelphia Suburban Transit Company's Red Arrow Lines followed on January 29, 1970, after which SEPTA designated the city services as its "City Transit Division".

=== 21st century ===
Many of the present-day bus and trackless trolley routes were once streetcar lines. Many of the numbered routes were once lettered or named bus routes.

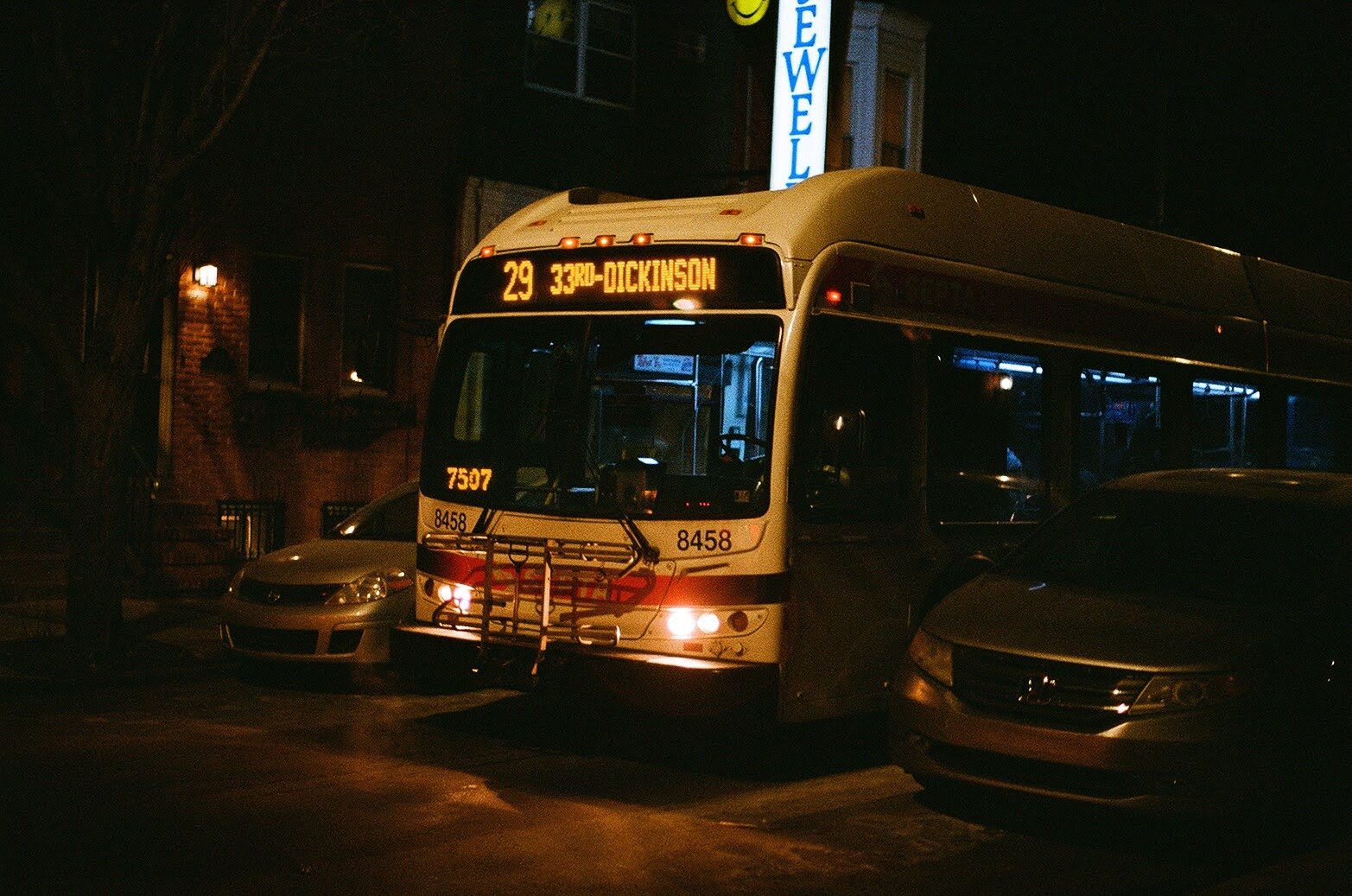
A 29 Bus traveling towards 23rd & Dickinson

Former streetcar lines •
Former lettered routes
- 2
- 3
- 5
- 6
- 7
- 12
- 17
- 23
- 25
- 26
- 29
- 30
- 31
- 33
- 37
- 38
- 39
- 40
- 42
- 43
- 46
- 47
- 48
- 52 (originally
  trolley Route 70)
- 53
- 54
- 55
- 56
- 57
- 59
- 60
- 61
- 64
- 66
- 73
- 75
- 79

Route	Formerly
1	Boulevard Limited
4	C, Nedro service
8	FOX (Frankford–Olney Express)
14	B
16	C, Cheltenham service
18	S
19	W, Krewstown branch
21	D
24	N
28	T, Rhawn Street branch
35	Z
41	J (Feb 2025)
51	L (Feb 2025)
63	G (Feb 2025)
65	E
67	W
68	M
70	Y
71	H (Feb 2025)
77	X
81	XH (Feb 2025)
82	R (Feb 2025)

The first bus route was Route A, established in 1923 between Center City Philadelphia and Frankford Terminal via Strawberry Mansion, Hunting Park Avenue, and Roosevelt Boulevard. Route R replaced Route A along Hunting Park and Roosevelt. Route A then served Roxborough and Andorra within Philadelphia and Barren Hill in Montgomery County. Route A was eliminated and replaced by bus Routes 9, 27, and 32 on February 4, 1984.

== List of routes ==
=== Numbered routes ===
==== Current routes ====
Route	Terminals		Major streets traveled	District	Service notes	History
1	Parx Casino	54th Street and City Avenue	City Avenue, Ridge Avenue, Hunting Park Avenue, Roosevelt Boulevard	Comly & Frankford	Limited-stop; No Sunday service	Originally known as the "Boulevard Limited", service began November 18, 1957, operating from Pennypack Circle to Hunting Park and Wissahickon Avenues; Extended north to Tremont Street on June 22, 1959. Extended to 54th Street and City Avenue on September 3, 1963; Service redesignated as Route 1 on September 12, 1988, with service extended to Red Lion and Academy Roads in Northeast Philadelphia and to 69th Street Terminal; Service to 69th Street Terminal was eliminated September 9, 1996; Byberry Industrial Park service began September 13, 1999; Parx Casino service began February 12, 2007
1	Decatur Road and Drummond Drive	54th Street and City Avenue	City Avenue, Ridge Avenue, Hunting Park Avenue, Roosevelt Boulevard	Comly & Frankford	Limited-stop; Select weekday trips only	
1	Byberry East Industrial Park	Wissahickon	City Avenue, Ridge Avenue, Hunting Park Avenue, Roosevelt Boulevard	Comly & Frankford	Limited-stop; Select rush hour trips only	
2	20th and Johnston Streets	Pulaski and Hunting Park Avenues	16th Street (northbound) / 17th Street (southbound)	Midvale & Southern		First trolley line in Philadelphia to receive a route number on October 11, 1911, when Brill Nearside cars were placed in service; Buses replaced streetcars on November 4, 1956; Southbound service moved from 15th Street to 17th Street on December 19, 1957, replacing Route 21 bus (former streetcar route) north of Market Street and Route 32 streetcar south of Market Street; Northbound service continues on 16th Street today
2	20th and Johnston Streets	Wayne Junction	16th Street (northbound) / 17th Street (southbound)	Midvale & Southern		Limited weekday service began February 27, 2017
3	33rd Street and Cecil B. Moore Avenue	Frankford Transit Center	Cecil B. Moore Avenue, Kensington Avenue, and Frankford Avenue	Frankford		Buses replaced streetcars on February 4, 1956
3	Smith Memorial Playground	Frankford Transit Center	Cecil B. Moore Avenue, Kensington Avenue, and Frankford Avenue	Frankford		Weekend only service started in 2013
4	Fern Rock Transit Center	Broad Street and Pattison Avenue (NRG Station)	Broad Street	Midvale & Southern		Service began February 19, 2012; Service was formerly the Fern Rock division of the Route C; Original Route 4 went from South Philadelphia to North Philadelphia via 6th and 7th Streets, Master Street, and 2nd and Front Streets until 1930, when it was replaced by Routes 57 and 65; Another Route 4 was created between 1958 and 1960; it went from Snyder Terminal to the Food Distribution Center via Broad, Oregon, 7th, Pattison, and Galloway. It looped via Oregon, Broad, Snyder, and 12th. By 1964, it looped around the food distribution center, and extended via Pattison, 11, Terminal, and Broad to the Philadelphia Naval Base. This became part of Route 17 on April 8, 1973.
5	Front Street and Market Streets	Frankford Transit Center	3rd Street (northbound) / 2nd Street (southbound), Frankford Avenue	Frankford		Route 5 streetcar ran from Frankford Avenue and Bridge Street to 3rd Street and Oregon Avenue; Buses replaced streetcars on December 24, 1955, as the second trolley route operated full-time by PCC's to be converted to bus operations in Philadelphia; Service south of Old City (2nd and Spruce Streets) merged into Route 57 on May 16, 1993; Northbound service via 3rd Street replaced by Route 57; Service cut back to Front & Market Streets on December 6, 1998
6	Cheltenham and Ogontz Avenues Loop	Olney Transit Center	Ogontz Avenue	Allegheny	24-hour service	Once a popular trolley line to Willow Grove Amusement Park (now the Willow Grove Park Mall); By 1932, it extended south replacing all of Route 49; Buses replaced trolleys north of Cheltenham Avenue to Willow Grove on June 8, 1958. Bus service known as "6 Bus" (see: Route 22 History); Remaining trolley service operated south of Cheltenham & Ogontz Avenues Loop (Cheltenham Square Mall); Buses replaced the streetcars on the remaining portion of the Route 6 on January 11, 1986; Route "6 Bus" renamed Route 22 on the same date to eliminate confusion over the current Route 6
7	Pier 70	33rd and Dauphin Streets	Oregon Avenue, 22nd Street (northbound) / 23rd Street (southbound), 29th Street	Southern		Route 7 streetcar ran from 33rd & Dauphin Streets (Strawberry Mansion) to 20th & Johnson Streets. (South Philadelphia).; Buses replaced streetcars on May 29, 1955.; Weekday service extended via Oregon Avenue to 2nd Street with peak hour service to Delaware Avenue and Christopher Columbus Boulevard on May 2, 1964, replacing Route 80 bus (former Route 80 trackless trolley).; Full service on weekdays and weekends extended to Oregon and Delaware Avenues on June 19, 1983; Service extended to Pier 70 Shopping Center on December 6, 1998
7	Whitman Plaza	33rd and Dauphin Streets	Oregon Avenue, 22nd Street (northbound) / 23rd Street (southbound), 29th Street	Southern		Limited service
7	21st and Oregon	33rd and Dauphin Streets	Oregon Avenue, 22nd Street (northbound) / 23rd Street (southbound), 29th Street	Southern		Limited service
8	Olney Transit Center	Frankford Transit Center	Tabor Road, Roosevelt Boulevard, Pratt Street	Frankford	Limited stop service; weekdays only	Formerly known as the "Frankford-Olney Express" ("FOX"); Service began June 19, 1973, was redesignated Route 8 on September 4, 1984; Midday service has been eliminated and restored several times, most recently restored September 2, 2008.; For PTC Route 8 streetcar service, see Routes 39 and 57
9	Ridge Avenue and Cathedral Road (Andorra)	4th and Walnut Street	Ridge Avenue, Schuylkill Expressway, Chestnut Street, and Walnut Street	Allegheny	No stops between Wissahickon Transportation Center and 30th Street Station	Service replaced Route A Express service via Ridge Avenue and to Andorra on February 5, 1984; Service cut back from Andorra to Summit Loop on September 1, 2002, due to community opposition; Service extended to Andorra Shopping Center on November 12, 2006; Route 9 streetcar from South Philly to Fairmount Park via 4th and 5th Streets, Arch Street, 22nd and 23rd Streets, Cecil B Moore, 31st and 32nd Streets was discontinued in 1956
10	63rd Street and Malvern Avenue Loop	13th Street station	Lansdowne Avenue, Lancaster Avenue	Callowhill	Trolley via subway–surface tunnel 24-hour service	see SEPTA Route 10
11	Darby Transit Center	13th Street station	Woodland Avenue	Elmwood	Trolley via subway–surface tunnel	see SEPTA Route 11
12	Christopher Columbus Boulevard and Dock Street	50th Street and Woodland Avenue	Walnut Street (westbound); Locust Street (eastbound); Grays Ferry Avenue	Southern		Route 12 trolley ran from 13th & South Streets to Darby via Grays Ferry and Woodland Avenues; Service was cut back from Darby to Island & Elmwood Avenues on November 6, 1955; Buses replaced streetcars on July 21, 1956, with bus service operating from 49th Street & Woodland Avenue to 5th & Market Streets via Market Street; Route 90 merged into Route 12, with service in Center City rerouted via Walnut and Locust Streets on September 7, 1997; Service Extended to From 3rd and Pine to Columbus and Dock in 2015
13	Chester and Callahan Avenues (Yeadon)	13th Street station	Chester Avenue	Elmwood	Trolley via subway–surface tunnel 24-hour service Limited service to Darby	see SEPTA Route 13
13	9th Street and Ridge Avenue	13th Street station	Chester Avenue	Elmwood	Trolley via subway–surface tunnel 24-hour service Limited service to Darby	see SEPTA Route 13
14	Neshaminy Mall	Frankford Transit Center	Roosevelt Boulevard and Lincoln Highway	Comly	24-hour service	Formerly known as Route B, service began June 26, 1921 (oldest still-operating bus route in the City Transit Division); Service at one time operated to Trenton; Extended from Langhorne to Oxford Valley Mall September 3, 1978; Redesignated Route 14 on June 16, 1985; Major restructuring occurred January 31, 1982, June 16, 1985, and September 11, 1988; New service to Byberry Industrial Park introduced February 14, 1990; Service to Sesame Place added June 6, 2021; Original Route 14 ran along 42nd Street, became part of Route 30 after 1971; Service to Sesame Place introduced in 2021
14	Oxford Valley Mall	Frankford Transit Center	Roosevelt Boulevard and Lincoln Highway	Comly	Limited service except overnights	
14	Sesame Place	Frankford Transit Center	Roosevelt Boulevard and Lincoln Highway	Comly	Limited service during park hours	
14	Byberry East Industrial Park	Frankford Transit Center	Roosevelt Boulevard and Lincoln Highway	Comly	Limited weekday service	
15	63rd Street and Girard Avenue	Richmond and Westmoreland Loop	Girard Avenue	Callowhill	Trolley (operates 24 hours)	see SEPTA Route 15; The line resumed limited streetcar operation as June 16, 2024 following a 4-year suspension. Trolleys run to Richmond-Westmoreland Streets Loop, while buses (and limited trolley service) serve the Northern Liberties Loop (Rivers Casino Philadelphia).
16	City Hall (15th and Market Streets)	Cheltenham & Ogontz Avenues Loop	Broad Street, Cheltenham Avenue	Midvale		Service began February 19, 2012; Formerly the Cheltenham Division of the Route C; Original Route 16 went from Center City to Fairmount Park via 19th and 20th Streets and York and Dauphin Streets (eliminated in 1929, as it was redundant to Routes 8/39 and 33)
17	Front and Market	20th and Johnston Streets	Market Street, 19th Street (southbound) / 20th Street (northbound)	Southern	24-hour service	Buses replaced streetcars on December 28, 1957.; Extended to the former Philadelphia Naval Base on April 8, 1973, replacing Route 4.; Route 71 replaced weekday midday service from Pattison Avenue to the Philadelphia Naval Business Center on February 22, 2004; Extended to Penn's Landing in June 2016 due to being permanently assigned with articulated buses due to limited space to layover at Front and Market terminal with Route 48 also an articulated assigned route.; Service to Navy Yard replaced by route 45 and service between Broad-Pattison and 20th-Johnston eliminated on August 23, 2026.
18	Oxford Avenue and Loney Street (Fox Chase Loop)	Michener and Wadsworth Avenues	Oxford Avenue, Rising Sun Avenue, Olney Avenue, Chew Avenue, Vernon Road Stenton Avenue (express)	Midvale	Limited service	Formerly known as Route S; Service introduced August 8, 1926; Peak hour service extended to Paper Mill Glen on October 5, 1959; On February 1, 1960, service was extended from Olney Terminal to Rising Sun Avenue. & Knorr Street Loop with peak hour service to Fox Chase. Express service established at the same time; Redesignated Route 18 on June 16, 1985, at the same time all weekday and weekend service was extended to Fox Chase to replace Route 26 service. Service to Paper Mill Glen eliminated at the same time.; Service extended to Cedarbrook Plaza on June 18, 1995.; PTC Route 18 went from South Philadelphia to Center City via 22nd and 23rd Streets, Catharine and Bainbridge Streets, 19th and 20th Streets, and Chestnut and Walnut Streets, and was eliminated on April 1, 1953, due to redundancy, as it was redundant to Route 7
18	Oxford Avenue and Loney Street (Fox Chase Loop)	Cheltenham Avenue and Easton Road	Oxford Avenue, Rising Sun Avenue, Olney Avenue, Chew Avenue, Vernon Road Stenton Avenue (express)	Midvale	AM rush hour express operates to Fox Chase Limited service from Fox Chase	
18	Oxford Avenue and Loney Street (Fox Chase Loop)	Cedarbrook Plaza	Oxford Avenue, Rising Sun Avenue, Olney Avenue, Chew Avenue, Vernon Road Stenton Avenue (express)	Midvale	24-hour service	
18	Olney Transit Center	Cedarbrook Plaza	Oxford Avenue, Rising Sun Avenue, Olney Avenue, Chew Avenue, Vernon Road Stenton Avenue (express)	Midvale	PM rush hour express to Cedarbrook	
19	Torresdale	Frankford Transit Center	Grant Avenue, Krewstown Road, Algon Avenue, Whitaker Avenue, Oxford Avenue, Cheltenham Avenue	Comly & Frankford	No Sunday service Select trips only operate from Frankford to Krewstown Road and Gregg Street	Formerly known as the Krewstown branch of the Route W; Route 19 service introduced June 17, 1985; Service extended to Torresdale station on September 14, 1987; Original Route 19 went from South Philadelphia to North Philadelphia via 6th and 7th Streets and Germantown Avenue; was replaced by Route 53 in 1929
20	Franklin Mall	Frankford Transit Center	Roosevelt Boulevard, Academy Road	Comly	24-hour service	Service began November 12, 1962; Extended to Neshaminy Mall on September 11, 1988, transferred to Route 130 on November 19, 2000; For PTC Route 20 Streetcar, see Route 23 history
20	Parx Casino	Frankford Transit Center	Roosevelt Boulevard, Academy Road	Comly	Select night trips only	Service began February 11, 2007
21	Christopher Columbus Boulevard and Dock Street	69th Street Transit Center	Walnut Street (westbound) / Chestnut Street (eastbound)	Callowhill		Formerly known as Route D; Service originally operated from 69th Street Terminal or to 4th Street via Chestnut and Walnut Streets in West Philadelphia, Locust and Samson Streets in Center City; Service in Center City moved to Chestnut and Walnut Streets on September 9, 1956, after removal of streetcar service; Extended to 2nd Street on January 18, 1976; Extended to Front & Walnut Streets on September 2, 1979; Extended to 2nd & Market Streets via Penn's Landing on September 8, 1985; Service on the Wycombe (Upper Darby) branch transferred to the Route 42 on June 16, 1996; Service to 61st & Pine Streets eliminated on August 31, 2008; For PTC Route 21 streetcar, see Route 2
22	Willow Grove Park Mall	Olney Transit Center	Easton Road, Cheltenham Avenue; York Road (Warminster service)	Midvale		Service began on June 8, 1958, as the Route "6 Bus" replacing Route 6 trolley service to the Willow Grove Amusement Park; Alternate service via Easton Road added on September 3, 1961, replacing County Transit Company bus service; Route "6 Bus" extended to Johnsville via Warminster on June 19, 1966, by merging Route 74 bus (former trolley line) into Route "6 Bus"; Service rerouted into the new Willow Grove Park Mall on August 1, 1982; Redesignated Route 22 on January 12, 1986, with the conversion of the Route "6 Streetcar" to bus operations; On September 7, 1997, service was streamlined to operate on the Easton Road and Old York Road routings between Glenside and Warminster; Service along Keswick Avenue and Edgehill Road (original trolley route) was eliminated; Original Route 22 went from Willow Grove to Doylestown via Doylestown Pike; this became Route 55 on June 19, 1966
22	Jacksonville Road and Potter Street (Warminster)	Olney Transit Center	Easton Road, Cheltenham Avenue; York Road (Warminster service)	Midvale		
23	11th and Market Streets	Chestnut Hill Loop	11th Street (northbound) / 12th Street (southbound), Germantown Avenue	Midvale	24-hour service	see SEPTA Route 23
23	Germantown Avenue and Ontario Street	Chestnut Hill Loop	11th Street (northbound) / 12th Street (southbound), Germantown Avenue	Midvale	Limited late-night service	see SEPTA Route 23
24	Huntingdon Pike and Berkeley Avenues (Rockledge)	Frankford Transit Center	Pratt Street, Oxford Avenue, and Huntingdon Pike	Comly		Formerly Route N, service redesignated Route 24 on September 12, 1988, with an extension to Bethayres; Route 24 Express service existed during SEPTA's Railworks Project, which reconstructed the Main Line from Wayne Junction to Market East in 1992–1993; Weekday service extended to Southampton, replacing Routes 301 and 302, on April 1, 2001; The original Route 24 went via 15th and 16th Streets and York Road until 1929, was redundant to Routes 2, 55, and 66
24	Gloria Dei Manor (Bethayres)	Frankford Transit Center	Pratt Street, Oxford Avenue, and Huntingdon Pike	Comly	Limited service	Formerly Route N, service redesignated Route 24 on September 12, 1988, with an extension to Bethayres; Route 24 Express service existed during SEPTA's Railworks Project, which reconstructed the Main Line from Wayne Junction to Market East in 1992–1993; Weekday service extended to Southampton, replacing Routes 301 and 302, on April 1, 2001; The original Route 24 went via 15th and 16th Streets and York Road until 1929, was redundant to Routes 2, 55, and 66
24	2nd Street and Knowles Avenue (Southampton)	Frankford Transit Center	Pratt Street, Oxford Avenue, and Huntingdon Pike	Comly	Limited service except Sundays	Formerly Route N, service redesignated Route 24 on September 12, 1988, with an extension to Bethayres; Route 24 Express service existed during SEPTA's Railworks Project, which reconstructed the Main Line from Wayne Junction to Market East in 1992–1993; Weekday service extended to Southampton, replacing Routes 301 and 302, on April 1, 2001; The original Route 24 went via 15th and 16th Streets and York Road until 1929, was redundant to Routes 2, 55, and 66
25	Front and Spring Garden Streets	Frankford Transit Center	Aramingo Avenue	Frankford	24-hour service	Originally a short trolley line from Girard station to Cedar Street & Lehigh Avenue; Buses replaced streetcars on April 9, 1949; Extended along Aramingo Avenue to Wheatsheaf Lane on June 14, 1987; Extended north to Richmond & Orthodox Streets on September 13, 1987; Extended south to Spring Garden station on February 28, 1988; Extended north to Frankford Terminal on September 7, 1997; Extended via Christopher Columbus Boulevard to Pier 70 Shopping Center on December 6, 1998, replacing part of Route Q; Extended south to the Columbus Commons Shopping Center on September 5, 2004; Rerouted via Butler and Richmond Streets in Bridesburg on September 3, 2006; Service south of Front-Spring Garden replaced by route 76 on August 23, 2026
26	Chelten Avenue	Frankford Transit Center	Chelten Avenue, Olney Avenue, Tabor Road, Magee Avenue, Harbison Avenue	Midvale		Route 26 streetcar operated from Germantown to Fox Chase via Chelten, Ogontz, and Rising Sun Avenues; Buses replaced streetcars on January 28, 1956; New branch of Routes 26 and S called the 26&S began service on February 25, 1973, provided weekday service from Germantown to Frankford. Service restructured on June 16, 1985, with Route 26 service rerouted east of Rising Sun & Olney Loop to serve Frankford Terminal, thus replacing Route 26&S.; Service along Rising Sun and Oxford Avenues to Fox Chase was replaced by Route 18; An earlier Route 26 via the Kensington-6th and 7th Streets Line was eliminated in 1922
26	Chelten Avenue	Rising Sun and Olney Avenues	Chelten Avenue, Olney Avenue, Tabor Road, Magee Avenue, Harbison Avenue	Midvale		
26	Chelten Avenue	One Olney Square	Chelten Avenue, Olney Avenue, Tabor Road, Magee Avenue, Harbison Avenue	Midvale		
26	Chelten Avenue	Olney Transit Center	Chelten Avenue, Olney Avenue, Tabor Road, Magee Avenue, Harbison Avenue	Midvale		
27	Broad and Carpenter Streets	Plymouth Meeting Mall	Vine Street Expressway, Schuylkill Expressway, Broad Street, Henry Avenue, Ridge Pike	Allegheny	No stops between 16th & Race Streets and Wissahickon Transportation Center	Replaced Route A Express service via Henry Avenue and to Barren Hill on February 5, 1984; Extended to Plymouth Meeting Mall on September 10, 1989; Rerouted to serve the Metroplex Shopping Center on September 3, 2000; An earlier Route 27 via the Kensington-12th and 13th Streets Line was eliminated in 1922.
27	Broad and Carpenter Streets	Ridge and Cathedral	Vine Street Expressway, Schuylkill Expressway, Broad Street, Henry Avenue, Ridge Pike	Allegheny	Limited Weekday Peak Hour service.	Replaced Route A Express service via Henry Avenue and to Barren Hill on February 5, 1984; Extended to Plymouth Meeting Mall on September 10, 1989; Rerouted to serve the Metroplex Shopping Center on September 3, 2000; An earlier Route 27 via the Kensington-12th and 13th Streets Line was eliminated in 1922.
27	Broad and Carpenter Streets	Barren Hill	Vine Street Expressway, Schuylkill Expressway, Broad Street, Henry Avenue, Ridge Pike	Allegheny		Replaced Route A Express service via Henry Avenue and to Barren Hill on February 5, 1984; Extended to Plymouth Meeting Mall on September 10, 1989; Rerouted to serve the Metroplex Shopping Center on September 3, 2000; An earlier Route 27 via the Kensington-12th and 13th Streets Line was eliminated in 1922.
28	Torresdale and Cottman Avenues Loop	Fern Rock Transit Center	Cadwalader Avenue, Rhawn Street	Comly		Service began January 31, 1982, replacing the Rhawn Street branch of the Route T from Cottman & Torresdale Avenues Loop to Fox Chase; Extended from Fox Chase to Fern Rock Transportation Center on September 11, 1988, replacing Route XA. At the same time, the original loop route via the Philadelphia Correctional Facilities was eliminated; An earlier Route 28 via North 2nd and 3rd Streets Line was eliminated in 1922.
29	Pier 70	33rd and Dickinson Streets	Tasker Street (westbound) / Morris Street (eastbound)	Southern		see SEPTA Route 29
30	30th Street Station	69th Street Transit Center	University Avenue, 41st Street (northbound) / 40th Street (southbound), Haverford Avenue, Vine Street	Callowhill		Former streetcar, service rerouted into the Subway-Surface Tunnel on June 8, 1913, replacing surface operation via Market Street to the Delaware Avenue Ferry Terminal; Subway-Surface Tunnel routing eliminated November 21, 1915, with streetcars terminating at 40th & Market Streets; Buses replaced streetcars on August 20, 1950; Weekday service extended to 30th Street Station by consolidating Routes 14 (former streetcar) and D-1 (University City to 30th Street Station); Extended to Lansdowne & Haverford Avesnues on January 13, 1991; Extended to 69th Street Terminal on September 8, 1996.
30	40th and Market	69th Street Transit Center	University Avenue, 41st Street (northbound) / 40th Street (southbound), Haverford Avenue, Vine Street	Callowhill		
31	City Hall	76th Street and City Avenue	Market Street, 63rd Street, Lansdowne Avenue	Callowhill		First streetcar line to operate into the Subway-Surface Tunnel, on December 18, 1905; Subway-Surface Tunnel service withdrawn on June 17, 1907, with streetcars operating via Market Street to Front Street; Service restored into the Subway-Surface Tunnel on December 28, 1930, then terminating at Market and 63rd Streets; Route 69 streetcar merged into Route 31 with service extended to Lansdowne and Haverford Avenues on September 11, 1938; Subway-Surface operation eliminated on May 15, 1949, due to redundancy with the Market–Frankford Line, with service now terminating at 40th and Market Streets; Buses replaced streetcars on June 16, 1956, with bus service extended back to City Hall via Market Street; After 1957, service rerouted from 65th and Vine to 63rd and Haverford, replacing part of Route 41; Service rerouted onto Chestnut and Walnut Streets between 46th and 63rd Streets due to the Market Street El Reconstruction Project in 2003
32	Broad and Carpenter Streets	Ridge and Lyceum Avenues	33rd Street, Henry Avenue	Midvale		Service replaced Route A Local service to Roxborough and Andorra via Ridge Avenue on February 5, 1984; Service between Roxborough and Andorra eliminated on September 8, 1996, due to budget constraints; Original Route 32 streetcar went from South Philadelphia to Center City via 17th and 18th Streets and Market Street until 1957, when it was replaced by the rerouted Route 2
33	5th and Market	23rd and Venango Streets	Market Street, 22nd Street, 20th Street (northbound) / 19th Street (southbound)	Allegheny	24-hour service	Original streetcar routing through Center City was on Arch Street; Buses replaced streetcars on December 24, 1955; Crosstown Center City service moved from Arch Street to Market Street on December 29, 1957; Extended to Penn's Landing on February 23, 1992
34	13th Street	61st–Baltimore/Angora	Baltimore Avenue	Elmwood		see SEPTA Route 34
36	80th Street/Eastwick	13th Street	Elmwood Avenue	Elmwood	24-hour service terminates at 73rd Street and Elmwood Avenue only	see SEPTA Route 36
36	73rd and Elmwood	13th Street	Elmwood Avenue	Elmwood	24-hour service terminates at 73rd Street and Elmwood Avenue only	see SEPTA Route 36
37	Snyder (Broad Street and Snyder Avenue)	Chester Transit Center	Passyunk Avenue, Lindbergh Boulevard, Industrial Highway	Southern	24-hour service (overnight service terminates at Harrah's)	see SEPTA Route 37
38	5th and Market Streets	Wissahickon	Benjamin Franklin Parkway, Belmont Avenue	Callowhill		see SEPTA Route 38
39	Richmond and Cumberland Streets	33rd and Dauphin Streets	Huntingdon Street, Susquehanna Avenue, York Street (westbound) / Cumberland Street, Dauphin Street (eastbound)	Midvale		Formerly a combined streetcar route referred to as the Route 8/39. Both streetcar lines began at 33rd & Dauphin Streets Loop (Strawberry Mansion) and followed the same routing (Eastbound via Dauphin Street, westbound via Susquehanna Avenue) to the York-Dauphin station, where they separated. Route 8 terminated at Richmond & Norris Streets, while Route 39 terminated at Richmond and Cumberland Streets.; Buses replaced streetcars on both lines on February 25, 1956; On June 16, 1974, Route 8 was reduced to a short shuttle bus line from York-Dauphin to Richmond and Norris Streets; On February 8, 1998, eastbound service was rerouted via 5th Street, Lehigh Avenue, and American Street due to the permanent street closure of Dauphin Street between 5th and American Streets. With this exception, the bus route follows the old streetcar routing
40	2nd and Lombard Streets	Conshohocken Avenue and Monument Road	Lombard Street, 41st Street (outbound) / South Street, 40th Street (inbound), Parkside Avenue	Callowhill	Most inbound PM trips operate via Pine Street east of Broad Street	Streetcar service operated from Parkside Loop (see Route 38) to 2nd and Lombard Streets; Buses replaced streetcars on September 8, 1956; Weekend evening service rerouted via Pine Street east of Broad Street beginning February 28, 1988; Extended to Conshohocken Avenue and Monument Road on April 4, 1993, replacing a portion of Route 85
41	Wissahickon and Chelten Aves (Germantown)	Bridesburg	Lindley Avenue, Margaret Street, Orthodox Street (Frankford & Logan)	Frankford		Portions of former Route 75 streetcar and trackless trolley east of Frankford Avenue; Previously Route J until February 22, 2025
42	2nd and Spruce	61st and Pine	Walnut Street, Chestnut Street, Spruce Street and Marshall Road	Callowhill	24-hour service Trips alternate between Wycombe and 61st Street terminals	Streetcar line ran from 61st and Pine Streets near Cobbs Creek to Front and Chestnut Streets via Spruce, Chestnut, and Walnut Streets; Buses replaced streetcars on September 8, 1956; Extended to 2nd and Dock Streets in 1965; Rerouted to serve 38th Street, University Avenue and Civic Center Boulevard in 1972; Westbound service rerouted via the Chestnut Street Transitway between 7th and 17th Streets on June 20, 1976, and was rerouted back to Walnut Street on June 20, 1993, with the conversion of the transitway back into a regular street; Extended west to Wycombe (Upper Darby) via Marshall Road (replacing Route 21) and extended east to Penn's Landing on June 16, 1996
42	2nd and Spruce	Sherbrook Boulevard and Springton Road (Wycombe)	Walnut Street, Chestnut Street, Spruce Street and Marshall Road	Callowhill	24-hour service Trips alternate between Wycombe and 61st Street terminals	
42	5th and Chestnut	Sherbrook Boulevard and Springton Road (Wycombe)	Walnut Street, Chestnut Street, Spruce Street and Marshall Road	Callowhill	Late Night service	
42	10th and Chestnut	Sherbrook Boulevard and Springton Road (Wycombe)	Walnut Street, Chestnut Street, Spruce Street and Marshall Road	Callowhill	Late Night service	
43	Richmond and Cumberland Streets	50th Street and Parkside Avenue	Spring Garden Street	Callowhill		Streetcar service ran from Parkside Loop (see Route 38) to Front and Fairmount Streets in Northern Liberties; Buses replaced streetcars on July 4, 1956; Extended to Penn Treaty Park on June 8, 1997, and to Port Richmond Village Shopping Center on June 20, 1999
43	Penn Treaty Park	50th Street and Parkside Avenue	Spring Garden Street	Callowhill		
44	5th and Market Streets	Ardmore	Schuylkill Expressway, City Avenue, Montgomery Avenue (Ardmore service)	Callowhill	Some trips operate via Narberth	Service started by the PTC on September 6, 1960, as a weekday service between City Hall and 54th Street & City Avenue via the Schuylkill Expressway; Red Arrow Lines began a joint operation with the PTC on February 12, 1962, extending service west to Ardmore via Narberth and east to Independence Mall (5th and Market Streets); Saturday service began August 31, 1963; Route 44G, a branch serving Gladwyne, began service in 1964; SEPTA took over PTC operations on September 28, 1968, Red Arrow operations on January 29, 1970, operating service jointly between its City and Suburban transit divisions; Alternate service bypassing Narberth via Montgomery Avenue began January 29, 1973; Sunday service began September 4, 1983; Route 44G was redesignated Route 49 on November 21, 1988; City Transit Division took complete control on November 26, 1989, redesignated it Route 121.; Eastbound service rerouted via 30th Street Station on September 7, 1997; Gladwyne service added on February 8, 2009, replacing Route 121 service. However, it was removed on August 23rd 2026 as part of the New Bus Network.; Original Route 44 went from Haddington to Center City via Lansdowne Avenue, Lancaster Avenue, Spring Garden Street, and Arch Street until 1929, when it was replaced by a rerouted Route 10.
44	5th and Market Streets	54th and City	Schuylkill Expressway, City Avenue, Montgomery Avenue (Ardmore service)	Callowhill		
45	Broad and Oregon Streets	12th and Noble Streets	11th Street (northbound) / 12th Street (southbound)	Southern		Split off from Route 23 in November 2015, which was formerly a trolley route running on 11th and 12th Streets. Route 45 was extended to the Navy Yard in August 2026 to prepare for the New Bus Network.; Original Route 45 went along Island Road from Hog Island to Eastwick. This was eliminated in 1925, but restored in 1944, and then eliminated again by 1957.; Another Route 45 was created on July 30, 1962, as a combined Red Arrow/PTC joint operation. Under SEPTA, it was a combined Suburban/City Transit operation until November 26, 1989, when it was redesignated as Routes 124 and 125.
45	The Navy Yard	12th and Noble Streets	11th Street (northbound) / 12th Street (southbound)	Southern		
46	58th Street and Baltimore Avenue	63rd Street and Malvern Avenue Loop	60th Street	Callowhill		Streetcar service ran from 60th Street and Lansdowne Avenue to 58th Street and Woodland Avenue via 60th and 58th Streets, one of the last streetcar lines in Philadelphia to use double-ended streetcars; Buses replaced streetcars on August 11, 1957. At the same service was extended south to 58th Street and Lindbergh Boulevard and north to 63rd Street & Malvern Avenue Loop; Service was cut back from 58th Street and Lindbergh Boulevarrd to Baltimore Avenue on September 6, 1964; Service to 63rd & Malvern Loop was rerouted via 60th Street and Columbia Avenue in the mid-1960s; In 1977, service was extended from Angora to Darby via Yeadon replacing Route 78 bus service (formerly a dinky streetcar line from Darby to Lansdowne); On September 10, 1989, service between Angora and Darby reduced to a shuttle bus operation. This was eliminated on September 8, 1996
47	Whitman Plaza	5th Street and Godfrey Avenue	7th Street (northbound) / 8th Street (southbound), 5th Street	Midvale & Southern	24-hour service	Original streetcar service through Center City and South Philadelphia operated on 8th and 9th Streets, starting on Wolf Street; Buses replaced streetcars south of Spring Garden Street on July 9, 1967, under PTC ownership due to construction of the PATCO Speedline underneath 8th Street; Buses replaced streetcars on the rest of the line on June 15, 1969 under SEPTA; Extended south to Whitman Plaza in on January 22, 1989; Selected trips rerouted off 9th Street to bypass the Italian Market on June 11, 1989, due to traffic congestion. On May 16, 1993, all northbound service was moved to 7th Street.; On May 16, 1993, northbound 9th Street service was reassigned to Route 47 m, operating northbound only and not on Mondays (as the Italian Market is closed). Monday service was later added on June 18, 1995.; Service Improvement Pilot ran from April 18, 2011, to October 30, 2011, in South Philadelphia by having buses stop every other block; 47M ended service on August 23, 2026.
48	Front and Market Streets	27th Street and Allegheny Avenue	Arch Street (westbound) / Market Street (eastbound), 29th Street	Allegheny		Streetcar service formerly operated in both directions on Arch Street in Center City; Buses replaced streetcars January 28, 1956; Eastbound service in Center City moved from Arch to Market Streets in 1959
49	33rd Street and Dauphin Street Loop	40th Street & Baltimore Avenue (at 40th Street Portal)	29th Street and 21st Street (southbound) / 20th Street and 30th Street (northbound), Market Street, University Avenue	Allegheny		Began operation on February 24, 2019.; Original Route 49 became part of Route 6 by 1932; the second one was renumbered from Route V between 1964 and 1966 and became part of Route 64 after 1976; the third one, former Route 44G, was created on November 21, 1988, and was renumbered Route 121 on November 26, 1989 (see Routes 44 and 52).; Cut to 40th Street with service south of University City replaced by 79 on August 23, 2026.
50	Parx Casino	Frankford Transit Center	Roosevelt Boulevard, Ashton Road, Academy Road, Knights Road	Comly	Limited-stop service along Roosevelt Boulevard	Service began February 11, 2007; See Route 57 for former Route 50 streetcar
51	Olney Transportation Center	Erdenheim or Plymouth Meeting Mall	Stenton Avenue, Germantown Pike	Midvale	24-hour service	Previously Route L until February 2025
51	Olney Transportation Center	Rodney and Mt. Airy	Stenton Avenue, Germantown Pike	Midvale	Limited Peak Hour Service	Previously Route L until February 2025
52	Wissahickon Transit Center	49th Street and Woodland Avenue	52nd Street and 54th Street	Callowhill	24-hour service	Formerly known as Route 70. Buses replaced streetcars on May 28, 1955. Redesignated Route 52 on September 6, 1964, with service south of Baltimore Ave. removed from Baltimore Ave. and 49th Street to operate via 54th Street and Greenway Avenue at the same time peak service operated to 58th St. & Lindbergh Blvd. replacing Route 46 service, Peak hour service to 58th St. & Lindbergh Blvd. eliminated June 16, 1996, due to poor ridership. Short trips added between Woodland Ave. and Parkside Loop (49th St. & Parkside Ave) on February 11, 2001. Due to the expansion of St. Joseph University campus the northern end of the route was rerouted via Overbrook Train station on June 15, 2003, then via Bala Cynwyd Shopping Center on City Ave. on January 23, 2005, after opposition of additional bus service via Drexel Road in the Overbrook section of the city. Some peak hour trips extended to Gladwyne on February 8, 2009, replacing Route 121 service (Also see: Route 44). Service to Park West Town Center began June 19, 2011. (see Route K for Route 52 streetcar service) 54th-City branch extended to Wissahickon Transit Center on June 14, 2026. Gladwyne service eliminated on August 23, 2026 along with Route 44.
52	50th and Parkside	Chester Ave	52nd Street and 54th Street	Callowhill	Weekdays only (Chester Ave limited peak hour service)	
53	Richmond and Westmoreland	Emlen Street and Carpenter Lane	Wayne Avenue, Hunting Park Avenue	Midvale		The original route went along 12th and 13th Streets and Wayne Avenue from South Philly to Carpenter. By 1932, it was rerouted to replace Route 19. This was the first streetcar line in Philadelphia to receive PCC cars. On Sundays Routes 53 and 75 streetcar lines were operated as one route between Mt. Airy and Bridesburg. This consolidated service ended when the Route 75 was converted to trackless trolley operation. On May 16, 1985, at 9am SEPTA track inspectors discovered misaligned rails on Wayne Ave. forcing buses to replace streetcars forever. Due to the closure of Luzerne Depot (replaced by Midvale Depot) service rerouted to terminate on street at 10th & Luzerne Sts. on June 8, 1997, Service extended to Broad Street and Hunting Park Avenue on February 22, 2004. Streetcar tracks still visible on Wayne Ave. on the bridge crossing over SEPTA's Chestnut Hill West Line and at the old Carpenter Loop. Rerouted on western end to Carpenter station and extended on eastern end to Richmond-Westmoreland Loop on August 23, 2026.
54	33rd and Dauphin	Richmond and Cambria	Lehigh Avenue, Cambria Street and Somerset Street	Allegheny		Western end of streetcar service originally operated to trolley loop at Ridge & Lehigh Aves. Buses replaced streetcars on June 4, 1955. Western terminal moved from Ridge & Lehigh Aves. and extended to 33rd & Dauphin Sts. Loop to connect with Routes 7, 32, 39, 49 and 61. Bus routing almost identical to the streetcar routing except on western end as mentioned above.
55	Olney Transportation Center	Willow Grove Park Mall	Old York Road, Easton Road (Pa. Route 611)	Midvale		The Route 55 trolley originally operated from Broad & Olney Terminal to Willow Grove. This was a second route to the Willow Grove Amusement Park (current location of Willow Grove Park Mall). Buses replace streetcars on September 8, 1940, with only rush hour streetcar service south of the Cheltenham Avenue & Old York Road-City Line. Then Full-time streetcar service south of the City Line restored on May 11, 1942. Streetcar service south of the city to Broad & Olney replaced by buses except during rush hours on December 3, 1945. All streetcar service replaced by buses on June 27, 1952. Service extended to Doylestown on June 19, 1966, replacing Route 22 bus service (former trolley line). Service extended to Cross Keys just north of Doylestown on February 2, 1975. Service rerouted to serve the new Willow Grove Park Mall on August 1, 1982. Service extended to the new Cross Keys Place shopping center on September 7, 1997.
55	Olney Transportation Center	Valley Square (Warrington)	Old York Road, Easton Road (Pa. Route 611)	Midvale	Limited service	
55	Olney Transportation Center	Cross Keys Place shopping center (Doylestown)	Old York Road, Easton Road (Pa. Route 611)	Midvale	Limited service	
55	Olney Transportation Center	Willow Grove Industrial Commons	Old York Road, Easton Road (Pa. Route 611)	Midvale	Limited weekday service	
55	Olney Transportation Center	UPS (Horsham)	Old York Road, Easton Road (Pa. Route 611)	Midvale	Limited weekday overnight service	
56	23rd and Venango Streets or Bakers Centre	Torresdale and Cottman Avenues	Erie Avenue, Torresdale Avenue	Midvale	24-hour service	In 1929, Route 56 extended from Mayfair to Frankford, replacing Route 58. Buses replaced trolleys on September 13, 1992. Restoration of trolley service is questionable. Currently along Torresdale Ave. all track has been paved over, overhead wire and trolley wire support poles have been removed. Along Erie Avenue, he track area has been paved over west of Broad St. Between Broad St. and Frankford Ave. all trolley overhead wires infrastructure has been removed. As mentioned with the Route 23 the same issues are there concerning the Route 56. SEPTA has a plan to purchase new cars and restore tracks, wires, and right of way along Erie Avenue. There has been some talk outside of SEPTA about moving Route 56 service to Wayne Junction where it would provide a connection with SEPTA's Regional Rail services. Night Owl service restored on September 4, 2005.
57	Fern Rock Transit Center	Whitman Plaza	American Street, Rising Sun Avenue, 3rd Street, 4th Street	Midvale & Southern	24-hour service	Streetcar service operated from 2nd St. & Erie Ave to 29th & Jefferson Sts. via Front, 2nd and 3rd Streets in a north–south direction with North Philadelphia crosstown service operating via Jefferson and Master Streets. The section along Front, 2nd and 3rd Streets replaced part of Route 4 in 1930. Buses replaced trolleys on June 18, 1955. The northern terminus was extended to 2nd St. & Godfrey Ave. on June 19, 1966. The northern terminus was cut back to Front & Spencer Sts. on January 22, 1967. A new branch of the route to Norris & Belgrade Sts. began on September 5, 1976, replacing Route 8 bus service (former streetcar line). Service was extended to the Fern Rock Transportation Center on January 31, 1982, replacing former Route XO bus service. Service restructured on May 16, 1993, by merging Route 50 now a bus route and the southern portion of Route 5 into one route. Service south of Lehigh Avenue moved to American Street. Northbound service south of Girard Ave. operates via 3rd Street replacing Route 5 service from South Philadelphia. Southbound service south of Girard Ave. operates via 4th Street replacing Route 50 (former streetcar) to South Philadelphia. Southbound Route 5 service on 2nd St. and Northbound Route 50 service on 5th St. through South Philadelphia eliminated. Crosstown Route 57 on Jefferson and Master Sts. (since eliminated) and the Route 57 branch service to Norris & Belgrade Sts. merged into a restructured Route 89. Since May 16, 1993, a few minor route changes have been made to this route. Select trips (every hour) rerouted via Cheltenham Avenue on August 23, 2026.
58	Frankford Transportation Center	Somerton or Neshaminy Mall	Bustleton Avenue	Comly		Formerly known as Route 59b. Service introduced April 18, 1949, replacing Route 59 streetcar service between Bustleton & Castor Aves. (Bells Corner) and Bustleton Ave. & Lott St. Service operates via Bustelton Ave. south of Cottman Ave. The original Route 58 went from Frankford to Mayfair via Margaret/Orthodox and Torresdale Avenue; this became part of Route 56 in 1929.
59	Arrott Transit Center	Castor and Bustleton Avenues/Bells Corner	Castor Avenue	Frankford	Buses temporarily replaced trackless trolleys in 2003; trackless service restored in 2008	Trackless trolleys replaced buses in 1950.
60	35th Street and Allegheny Avenue	Richmond and Westmoreland	Allegheny Avenue	Allegheny	24-hour service	Buses replaced streetcars in 1978; Extended to Wissahickon Transit Center on August 23, 2026
60	Wissahickon Transit Center	Richmond and Westmoreland	Allegheny Avenue	Allegheny	24-hour service	Buses replaced streetcars in 1978; Extended to Wissahickon Transit Center on August 23, 2026
61	Main and Leverington	9th and Market	Main Street, Ridge Avenue	Midvale		Buses replaced trolley buses in 1961. Roxborough service removed in 2011
63	Overbrook Station or Lankenau Hospital	Columbus Commons	56th Street, 57th Street, 58th Street, Passyunk Avenue, and Oregon Avenue	Southern	24-hour service, only serves 63rd & Malvern during AM rush hours. Trips alternate between Columbus Commons and Food Center	Portions of former Route 80 trackless trolley and Route 46 streetcar; Previously Bus Route G until February 22, 2025
63	Overbrook Station or Lankenau Hospital	Food Distribution Center	56th Street, 57th Street, 58th Street, Passyunk Avenue, and Oregon Avenue	Southern	24-hour service, only serves 63rd & Malvern during AM rush hours. Trips alternate between Columbus Commons and Food Center	Portions of former Route 80 trackless trolley and Route 46 streetcar; Previously Bus Route G until February 22, 2025
64	50th and Parkside	Pier 70	46th Street, Washington Avenue	Southern		Portions of old bus Route 63 (which went on Catharine and Bainbridge) merged with today's Route 64 (which was rerouted from Federal and Wharton to Washington) in September 2003. After 1976, it extended west along 49th and 48th, replacing Route 49. Rerouted off of Wharton and Reed Streets in South Philadelphia on August 23, 2026.
65	69th Street Transit Center	Germantown Avenue and Chelten Avenue	City Avenue, Walnut Lane	Callowhill		Formerly labeled Route E. The original Route 65 went along 4th and 5th Streets and Old York Road from Downtown to Logan. Between 1923 and 1932, Route 65 was moved to 6th and 7th streets, replacing part of Route 4. On April 4, 1953, it was eliminated (because it was mostly redundant to Route 23)
66	Frankford Transit Center	Frankford Avenue and Knights Road	Frankford Avenue	Frankford	24-hour service	see SEPTA Route 66
66	Frankford Transit Center	Gregg Street	Frankford Avenue	Frankford	24-hour service	
67	Frankford Transportation Center	Bustleton or Franklin Mall	Verree Road, Red Lion Road,	Comly & Frankford		Formerly labeled Route W. A spur route used to run on Jeanes Street until residents protested and had it removed in 1982. When it was rerouted SEPTA changed the letter W to the numbered route 67. The original Route 67 went on the Zoo-33rd and 36th Streets Line until 1918.
68	Eastwick, UPS Air Hub, 69th Street Transit Center, or Tinicum	Broad and Oregon	Moyamensing Avenue, Bartram Avenue, Church Lane	Southern	24-hour service (weekdays only)	Formerly labeled Route M. The original Route 68 went on the Point Breeze-11th and 12th Streets Line until 1914. A second Route 68 went from 3rd & Highland, Chester to Brookhaven on June 30, 1960. Routes 68 and 69 merged into new SEPTA Route 70 on June 18, 1973. A later Route 68 went from Darby via Gladwyne to Ardmore (discontinued February 1982).
70	Fern Rock Transit Center	Torresdale and Cottman or Gregg Street loop	Cottman Avenue, State Road	Comly		Formerly labeled Route Y. (see Route 52 for Route 70 streetcar service) Routes 68 and 69 merged into another SEPTA Route 70 on June 18, 1973. This SEPTA Route 70 was redesignated Route 117 on June 30, 1986.
71	Broad Street and Erie Avenue	Cheltenham & Ogontz Bus Loop	Cheltenham Avenue, Greene Street, Mt. Pleasant Avenue, Easton Road	Midvale		Previously Bus Route H until February 22, 2025
72	Frankford Transit Center	Cedarbrook Plaza	Cheltenham Avenue	Frankford		New route created on August 23, 2026
73	Frankford Transit Center	Richmond and Westmoreland	Bridge Street, Richmond Street	Frankford		Buses replaced streetcars in 1948.
75	Arrott Transit Center	Wayne Junction	Wyoming Avenue	Frankford	Buses temporarily replaced trackless trolleys in 2003; trackless service restored in 2008	A section was renumbered Route 26 by 1932. Trackless trolleys replaced streetcars in 1948. Cut back from Richmond & Orthodox in Bridesburg in mid-1960s due to I-95 construction; replaced by J bus.
76	Rising Sun and Olney Avenues	Columbus Commons	Christopher Columbus Boulevard, G Street	Midvale		New route created on August 23, 2026 that replaced southern part of route 25.
77	Chestnut Hill	St Vincent Street and Roosevelt Boulevard	Willow Grove Avenue, Glenside Avenue, Township Line Road, Cottman Avenue	Midvale		Formerly labeled as Route X. The original Route 77 went from Chester to Media and became part of Route 116, but was later replaced by Route 114.
79	29th Street and Snyder Avenue	Christopher Columbus Boulevard and Snyder Avenue	Snyder Avenue	Southern	24-hour service	see SEPTA Route 79
79	Market and 41st Streets	Christopher Columbus Boulevard and Snyder Avenue	Snyder Avenue	Southern	24-hour service	see SEPTA Route 79
81	Broad And Erie	Cheltenham & Ogontz Bus Loop	Cheltenham Avenue, Greene Street, Washington Lane	Midvale		Previously Route XH until February 22, 2025
82	Frankford Transit Center	Wissahickon or Henry and Midvale	Roosevelt Boulevard, Hunting Park Avenue	Frankford	24-hour service	Portions of former Route A; Formerly Route R until February 2025
84	Frankford Transit Center	Somerton	State Road, Southampton Road	Comly		Portions were parts of Routes T & 88.
88	Frankford Transit Center	Pennypack Park or Bethayres	Welsh Road	Comly & Frankford		Portions formerly labeled Route T (later Route 41).
310	Willow Grove Park Mall	Horsham	Welsh Road, Dresher Road, Blair Mill Road, Moreland Road	Contract operations (Germantown Depot)	No Sunday service	"Horsham Loop"; Service along Blair Mill Road transferred to Route 311 bus on February 27, 2017. Route 311 combined with Route 310 and discontinued on August 25, 2025.

==== School routes ====
SEPTA operates bus routes numbered in the 400 Series which are designed to serve students attending schools in the city of Philadelphia. Per federal regulations, SEPTA is not allowed to offer charter bus service for the School District of Philadelphia, so all riders are allowed to utilize the 400 Series routes.

==== Former routes ====
- Route 35 was used for the Manayunk Roxborough Loop that originated from the Wissahickon Transit Center. The route was eliminated in the first phase of the New Bus Network on August 23, 2026.
- Route 41 was previously used twice: the original Route 41 went along 63rd Street and Market Street from Overbrook to Downtown; this became part of Route 31 and Route 10 after 1957. The second one replaced the part of Route T on Welsh Road on January 31, 1982; this later became part of Route 88. Bus Route J was renumbered to Route 41 on February 22, 2025.
- Route 47M was used for a northbound alternate routing of the Route 47 that ran along 9th Street in South Philadelphia. The route was eliminated in the first phase of the New Bus Network on August 23, 2026.
- Route 51 went from Downtown Fairmount Park via 8th and 9th Streets and Columbia Avenue; this was eliminated in 1929 and replaced by rerouted Route 3. The current Route 51 was rebranded from Route L on February 22, 2025.
- Route 62 was used for a route running from 9th and Market streets in Center City to Andorra. The route was eliminated in the first phase of the New Bus Network on August 23, 2026.
- Route 63 went on Catharine & Christian Streets; it was eliminated in September 2003 in exchange for rerouting of Route 64. SEPTA redesignated Bus Route G to Route 63 on February 22, 2025.
- Route 69 was used three times: the original Route 69 was replaced by Route 31 on September 10, 1938; the second Route 69 was created on June 30, 1960, from Chester to Buckman Village and Highland Village. Routes 68 and 69 merged into new SEPTA Route 70 on June 18, 1973; the third Route 69 (former Route F) was discontinued on December 7, 1990; it went from Wynnefield along Columbia, Creighton, Jefferson, Parkside, Ford, Conshohocken, Neill, Presidential (it went on Belmont and City going south, and Presidential going north), and Belmont to Manayunk.
- Route 71 was used four times previously: The original Route 71 went from Darby to Media; it was converted to buses on August 13, 1938. By 1944, it was rerouted replacing Route 72. Later, part was replaced by Route 117 and the rest was eliminated. The second use of Route 71 was the Shopper's Special Route Darby-Aldan-Springfield-Lawrence Park-Ardmore Junction; it ran from 1971 to 1972. The third one went from Overbrook to Paoli and Exton. It was replaced by Route 105 on November 28, 1983. The fourth one was a new one initiated in 2004, from Navy Yard to Broad Street. It was discontinued in late 2012 and replaced with the private Navy Yard Shuttle on December 3. The fifth and current usage of Route 71 took effect on February 22, 2025 when SEPTA redesignated Bus Route H to Route 71.
- Route 72 was used twice: the first one went from Folsom to Prospect Park via Lincoln Avenue and was replaced by rerouted Route 71 by 1944; the second one went from Darby to Delmar Village; it merged with Route 83 to form Route 115 on June 30, 1986. A new Route 72 would begin operations on August 23, 2026, from Frankford Transit Center to Cedarbrook Plaza via Pratt St, Roosevelt Blvd, Adams Ave, Crescentville Rd, and Cheltenham Ave.
- Route 74 was used twice: the first one went from Willow Grove to Hatboro and was replaced by part of Route 6 Bus on June 19, 1966; the second one was created on January 29, 1970, and was redesignated as Route 114 on June 30, 1986.
- Route 76 was used twice: the first one went from Darby to Marcus Hook and was replaced by an extended Route 113 on November 28, 1983, and the second one was a replacement of Mid-City Loop Ben Franklin line service from 5th and Market to the zoo. This route was replaced by the Shopping Spree service in 2001 until 2003. A new Route 76 would begin service on August 23rd 2026 from Columbus Commons to Rising Sun & Olney. This route will replace a part of Route 25 to Columbus Commons.
- Route 78 was used for a route providing two late night express trips from Center City to Cornwells Heights station. The route was eliminated in the first phase of the New Bus Network on August 23, 2026.
- Route 80 was used for multiple different routes. The original Route 80 was the city's first trackless trolley route, and operated on Oregon Avenue in South Philly (but was replaced by extensions of Route 7 and Route G); the second one was designated on January 29, 1970. That was redesignated Route 118 on June 30, 1986. (which was later truncated). The most recent Route 80 was established on February 7, 2000. This route provided peak hour express service from Olney Transit Center to Horsham. The route was eliminated in the first phase of the New Bus Network on August 23, 2026.
- Route 81 was used three times, including its current usage: the first one operated in South Philly along Passyunk Avenue and Snyder Avenue; the section east of Snyder terminal was discontinued between 1954 and 1956; the remainder was discontinued by 1958. The second one operated from Springfield to Decker Square via US 1. Route 81 was rebranded from Bus Route XH on February 22, 2025.
- Route 82 was used three times previously: the first one operated on the Chester-47th Street Line until 1918. The second one went from Chester to Springfield; regular service was discontinued but school service for Cardinal O'Hara ran until 1986 when Ridley Township School District took over the operation. The third was used briefly in the 1990s as "ColumBUS" with service to the Penns Landing area from the Benjamin Franklin Parkway. The fourth and current usage of Route 82 took effect after Bus Route R was rebranded on February 22, 2025.
- Route 83 was used three times: the first one operated on the Island Road Line until 1918; the second one looped on Race, 4th, Market, 3rd Arch, and 7th, and was discontinued in 1953 or 1954; the third one (former Victory Depot Route H) was created on June 16, 1975, from Darby to Brookline; it merged with Route 72 to form Route 115.
- Route 85 was used twice: the first one went on the Race and Arch Streets Line until 1914; the second one was discontinued on April 4, 1993, with portions transferred to Route 40; the section on Ford Road has no service now.
- Route 86 was used twice: the first one went on the Glenside Short Line until 1913. The second one was rerouted from Grant Avenue to Welsh Road, and continued on Torresdale Avenue to Linden Avenue between 1958 and 1960; it later became part of Route T (later Route 41, now Route 88) and Route 88.
- Route 87 went via Northeast Village, Academy Road and Linden Avenue; part became part of Route 20; the rest was discontinued because the Airport had expanded, closing part of the roads Route 87 went on between 1960 and 1964.
- Route 89 was used for a route running from Arrott Transit Center to Front and Dauphin Streets along Aramingo Avenue, Castor Avenue, and G Street. Portions were formerly labeled Route P and portions were part of former Route 8. The original route went via Tioga and Venango. The route was eliminated in the first phase of the New Bus Network on August 23, 2026.
- Route 90 went on Spruce & Pine Street (east of 8th)/Locust Street (west of 8th) and looped on 26th, South, and 22nd. This was discontinued after 1996 and partially replaced by a rerouted Route 12 along Walnut and Locust Streets. The current usage of Route 90 was created from part of Route 99 on October 31, 2005.
- Route 121 was renumbered from Route 49 on November 26, 1989. It became part of Routes 44 and 52 on February 8, 2009.
- Route 311 was merged into Route 310 and discontinued on August 25, 2025.

On August 24, 2025, Routes 1, 8, 12, 30, 31, 35, 47M, 50, 62, 73, 78, 80, 88, 89, BLVD DIR, and MANN LOOP were eliminated due to service cuts resulting from a $213 million budget deficit. However, service was restored on these routes on September 14, 2025.

=== Lettered routes ===
These Bus routes were made because they never started their journeys as former trolleys from the PTC.

Route	Terminals		Major streets traveled	District	Notes	History
A	Broad and South	Andorra				Section on Roosevelt & Hunting Park became part of Route R by 1971; Split into Routes 9, 27 & 32 on February 5, 1984
A Express	Broad and South	Plymouth Meeting Mall				Section on Roosevelt & Hunting Park became part of Route R by 1971; Split into Routes 9, 27 & 32 on February 5, 1984
B	Bridge and Pratt	Langhorne		Comly		Renumbered Route 14 on June 16, 1985
C	Cheltentham & Ogontz Avenues	City Hall	Broad Street	Midvale and Southern	Paralleled the Broad Street Line subway Alternate buses on each branch	SEPTA justified the alignment because it provided more frequent stops than the subway, better serving passengers between stations. In FY 2010, the route had 4,520,308 annual passengers, and 14,958 average weekday passengers, for a total of $4,211,345 in passenger revenue. It cost $13,421,916 to operate with 26 buses at peak hours, yielding a 31% farebox recovery ratio. 136,640 (average weekday FY 2010); Split into routes 4 and 16 on February 19, 2012
C	Fern Rock Transit Center	Broad and Geary	Broad Street	Midvale and Southern	Paralleled the Broad Street Line subway Alternate buses on each branch	SEPTA justified the alignment because it provided more frequent stops than the subway, better serving passengers between stations. In FY 2010, the route had 4,520,308 annual passengers, and 14,958 average weekday passengers, for a total of $4,211,345 in passenger revenue. It cost $13,421,916 to operate with 26 buses at peak hours, yielding a 31% farebox recovery ratio. 136,640 (average weekday FY 2010); Split into routes 4 and 16 on February 19, 2012
D						Renumbered Route 21
E						Renumbered Route 65
F	Overbrook	Angora	64th Street, 63rd Street, 62nd Street			Discontinued by 1971
F						Renamed from Red Arrow Route "K" when SEPTA bought Victory Depot; Renamed Route 69, then discontinued on December 7, 1990
G	Overbrook Station or Lankenau Hospital	Columbus Commons	56th Street, 57th Street, 58th Street, Passyunk Avenue, and Oregon Avenue	Southern	24-hour service, only serves 63rd & Malvern during AM rush hours. Trips alternate between Columbus Commons and Food Center	Portions of former Route 80 trackless trolley and Route 46 streetcar; Became Bus Route 63 in February 2025
G	Overbrook Station or Lankenau Hospital	Food Distribution Center	56th Street, 57th Street, 58th Street, Passyunk Avenue, and Oregon Avenue	Southern	24-hour service, only serves 63rd & Malvern during AM rush hours. Trips alternate between Columbus Commons and Food Center	Portions of former Route 80 trackless trolley and Route 46 streetcar; Became Bus Route 63 in February 2025
H	Broad Street and Erie Avenue	Cheltenham & Ogontz Bus Loop	Cheltenham Avenue, Greene Street, Mt. Pleasant Avenue, Easton Road	Midvale		Became Bus Route 71 in February 2025
J	Wissahickon and Chelten Aves (Germantown)	Bridesburg	Lindley Avenue, Margaret Street, Orthodox Street (Frankford & Logan)	Frankford	24-hour service along Orthodox and Lefevre / Margaret Streets (two "night owl" trips between Frankford T.C. and Westmoreland Loop)	Portions of former Route 75 streetcar and trackless trolley east of Frankford Avenue; Became Bus Route 41 in February 2025
K	East Falls	Arrott Terminal	Adams Avenue, 66th Avenue, Chelten Avenue	Frankford		Portion from Germantown to Fern Rock is former Route 52 streetcar; Slated to be discontinued in the near future; Proposal would merge Route K's services into a newly rerouted and extended Route 26. But cuts back in 2025 saved the route for now.
L	Olney Transit Center	Erdenheim or Plymouth Meeting Mall	Stenton Avenue, Germantown Pike	Midvale	24-hour service	Became Bus Route 51 in February 2025
L	Olney Transit Center	Rodney and Mt. Airy	Stenton Avenue, Germantown Pike	Midvale	Limited Peak Hour Service	Became Bus Route 51 in February 2025
M						Renumbered Route 68
N						Renumbered Route 24 on September 12, 1988, and extended to Bethayres
O					Part duplicated by Route N	Became part of Route Y by 1971, and is now part of Route 70
P						Became part of revised Route 89 after 1971
Q						Eventually became a southern extension of Route 25 and an eastern extension of Route 43
R	Frankford Transit Center	Wissahickon Transit Center or Henry and Midvale	Roosevelt Boulevard, Hunting Park Avenue	Frankford	24-hour service	Portions of former Route A; Became Bus Route 82 in February 2025
S	West Oak Lane					Renumbered Route 18 on June 16, 1985
T						Split into Routes 28 and 41 on January 31, 1982; one section transferred to Route 84
U						Became part of Route 108 on April 4, 1993
V						Renumbered Route 49 between 1964 and 1966; now part of Route 64
W	Bridge and Pratt					Split into Routes 19 and 67 on June 16, 1985
X	Erdenheim	City line				Extended east, and original section transferred to Route L by 1971; renumbered Route 77 in 1995
Y						Renumbered Route 70
Z						Renumbered Route 35 on October 8, 1967
XA	Fern Rock Transit Center					Became an extension of Route 28 on September 11, 1988
XB	Fern Rock Transit Center					Became an extension of Route 38 on September 1, 1960
XH	Broad And Erie	Cheltenham & Ogontz Bus Loop	Cheltenham Avenue, Greene Street, Washington Lane	Midvale		Became Bus Route 81 in February 2025
XO						Became an extension of Route 57 on January 31, 1982

=== LUCY routes ===
The LUCY routes (Loop through University CitY) follow a circular route in University City. There are two lines—Green and Gold—both of which travel mostly along the same streets, but in opposite directions. Technically, there are no terminal stops, but the schedules lists 30th Street Station as its end point although drivers take their layovers on JFK Boulevard just west of 30th Street.

Route	Terminals	Major streets traveled	District	Notes
Green Loop	30th Street Station	Market Street, 40th Street, 33rd Street	Contract operations (Germantown Depot)	Clockwise loop
Gold Loop	30th Street Station	34th Street, 38th Street, Market Street	Contract operations (Germantown Depot)	Counterclockwise loop

=== Boulevard Direct ===
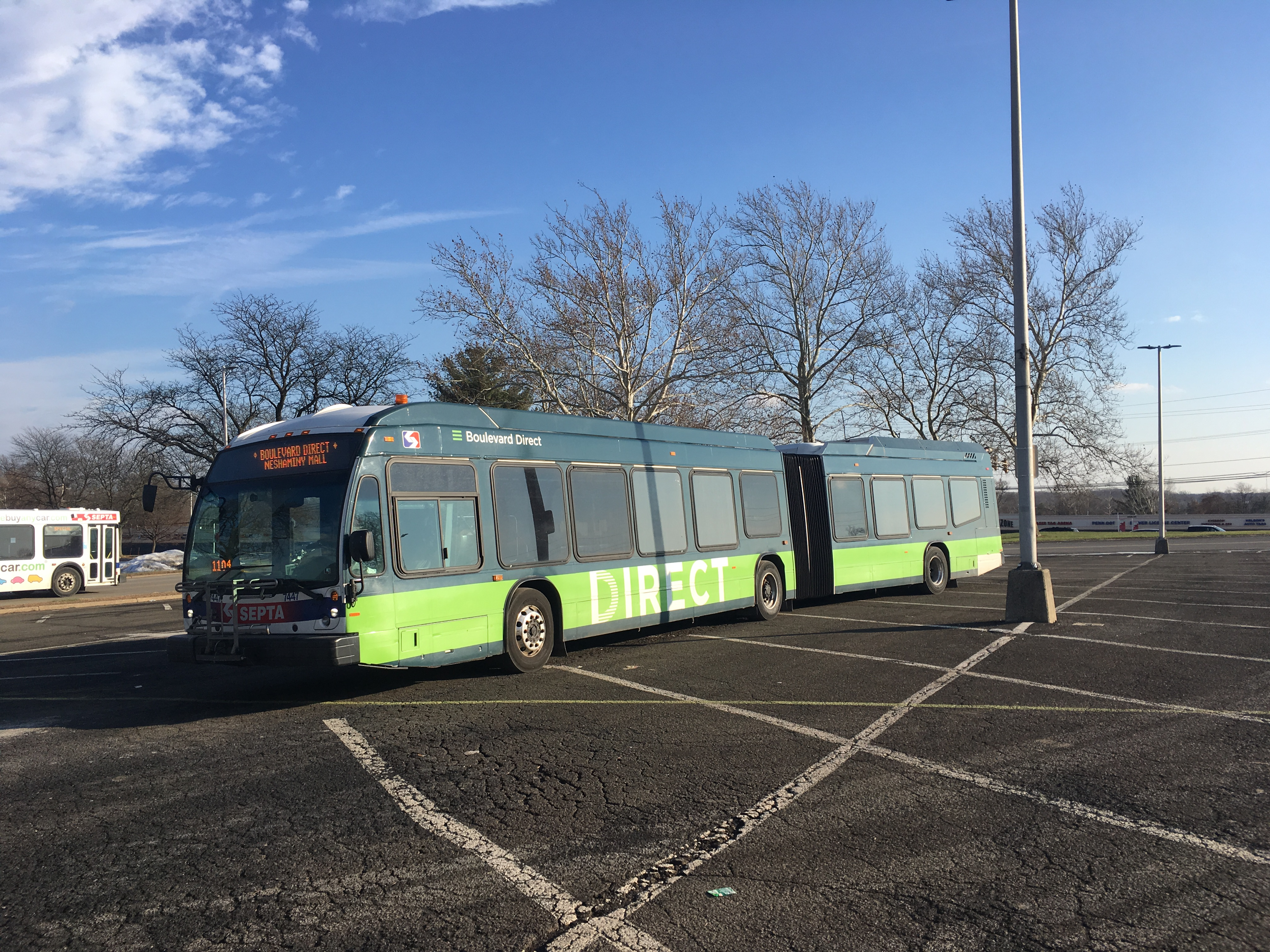
Boulevard Direct bus at Neshaminy Mall

The Boulevard Direct, which is part of the SEPTA DIRECT BUS brand, operates along Roosevelt Boulevard between the Frankford Transportation Center and the Neshaminy Mall. Boulevard Direct offers limited-stop service along Roosevelt Boulevard, with service operating every 10–15 minutes during most times on weekdays and every 15 minutes on weekends. The service offers improved travel times compared to traditional bus service along Route 14, with more frequent service and several bus stops located on the far side of intersections to improve performance. SEPTA offers a free interchange between the Boulevard Direct and the Route 14 bus for same direction travel. The Boulevard Direct service was launched on October 22, 2017. The Boulevard Direct is operated by the Comly District. Service is planned to be extended to Wissahickon Transit Center in February 2027 to replace route 1.

=== SEPTA Owl Link ===
SEPTA Owl Link was an on-demand microtransit service that provided late night connections from City Transit routes to employers in lower Bucks County. The service connected with the Route 14 bus at Horizon Boulevard, the Route 56 bus at the Torresdale & Cottman Loop, and the Route 66 trackless trolley at the City Line Loop. Trips on SEPTA Owl Link were free with a SEPTA Key card. The SEPTA Owl Link service started on May 10, 2021, as a pilot program. The service ended on February 12, 2022.

== See also ==
- SEPTA Suburban Division bus routes
- Trolleybuses in Philadelphia
