= Methodist Hospital (Philadelphia) =

- Jefferson Health
- Location within Philadelphia

Geography
- Location: Philadelphia, Pennsylvania, United States
- Coordinates: 39.920973°N 75.169716°W

Organization
- Care system: Non-Profit
- Type: Community Hospital
- Affiliated university: Thomas Jefferson University

Services
- Beds: 204

History
- Founded: 1881

Links
- Website: https://www.jeffersonhealth.org/locations/methodist-hospital
- Lists: Hospitals in Pennsylvania

Methodist Hospital is a hospital in the Lower Moyamensing neighborhood of South Philadelphia, affiliated with Jefferson Health, Thomas Jefferson University Hospital, Jefferson Hospital for Neuroscience and Thomas Jefferson University. Incorporated in 1881 and opened in 1892, Methodist serves patients in Philadelphia and the surrounding communities.

== History ==
Methodist Hospital was founded by Dr. Scott Stewart, a Methodist physician in Philadelphia, who dedicated $250,000 in his will to assist in building the hospital and a nursing school. The hospital was incorporated in 1881 and ground was broken in 1888. The hospital and nursing school opened in 1892 as Methodist Episcopal Hospital.

The hospital affiliated with Jefferson Medical College in 1950 and became a division of Thomas Jefferson University Hospital in 1996.

== Departments and services ==
Methodist Hospital provides medical services across a number of specialized centers, programs, departments and divisions.

- Anesthesiology
- Diabetes Center
- Emergency Department at Jefferson
- Endocrinology, Diabetes and Metabolic Diseases
- Gastroenterology and Hepatology
- Gynecology & Women's Services
- Headache Center
- Hospital Medicine
- Internal Medicine
- JeffFIT (Outpatient Rehabilitation & Physical Therapy)
- Sidney Kimmel Cancer Center at Jefferson
- Magnetic Resonance Imaging (MRI)
- Medical Oncology
- Minimally Invasive and Robotic Surgery Center
- Neurology
- Outpatient Lab
- Radiology
- Rehabilitation Medicine
- Senior Adult Oncology Center
- Shoulder and Elbow Center
- Surgery
- Women's Diagnostic Center

== Timeline ==
- 1892-1913 (1892) Methodist Episcopal Hospital and the Training School for Nurses open. The first class of nurses graduated in 1894.
- 1914-1918 (Involvement in WWI) In 1914 three trained Methodist Episcopal Hospital nurses traveled on the American Red Cross “Mercy Ship” to care for Russian and French soldiers. In 1917, Methodist Episcopal Hospital establishes a 250-bed field hospital in Best, France.
- 1919-1929 Methodist Episcopal Hospital gains popularity as Dr. Richard Norris assists famous clientele in Childbirth, ex. The DuPonts from Wilmington, Delaware.
- 1950s In 1950 Methodist Episcopal Hospital establishes an affiliation with Jefferson Medical College and allows their resources for medical teaching.
- 1960-1975 The Hospital undergoes a massive renovation for tall sleek buildings that can better handle the newest medical technologies. Methodist Episcopal Hospital has its name changed to Methodist Hospital in 1961. In 1965, Methodist Hospital helps in vaccinating Philadelphians in Polio, Tetanus, and the Whooping Cough.
- 1976-1992 Methodist Hospital Celebrates a century of service to the community, and developments continue. The first male students in the School of Nursing graduated in 1979. In the early 1980s, the Hospital underwent major construction, new surgical site, ICU, a Family Birth Center, CT and MRI Imaging Services and Healthmark. Methodist also established a preferred affiliation agreement with Thomas Jefferson University Hospital in 1988.
- 1993-2006 (1997) Methodist Hospital becomes a division of Thomas Jefferson University Hospital. The Family Birth Center closed in 2002. The Women's Diagnostic Center and The Jefferson Shoulder and Elbow Center are established.

St. Agnes Medical Center closes its acute care services in 2004. Methodist compensates by increasing its bed count to 204, including a new 12-bed Medical Intensive Care Unit, and an expanded emergency department. The Hand and Sports Medicine Surgical programs are established. Jefferson College of Health Professions takes in the Methodist Nursing School program in 2006.
