= 37th–Spruce station =

Subway station in Philadelphia, Pennsylvania

37th–Spruce
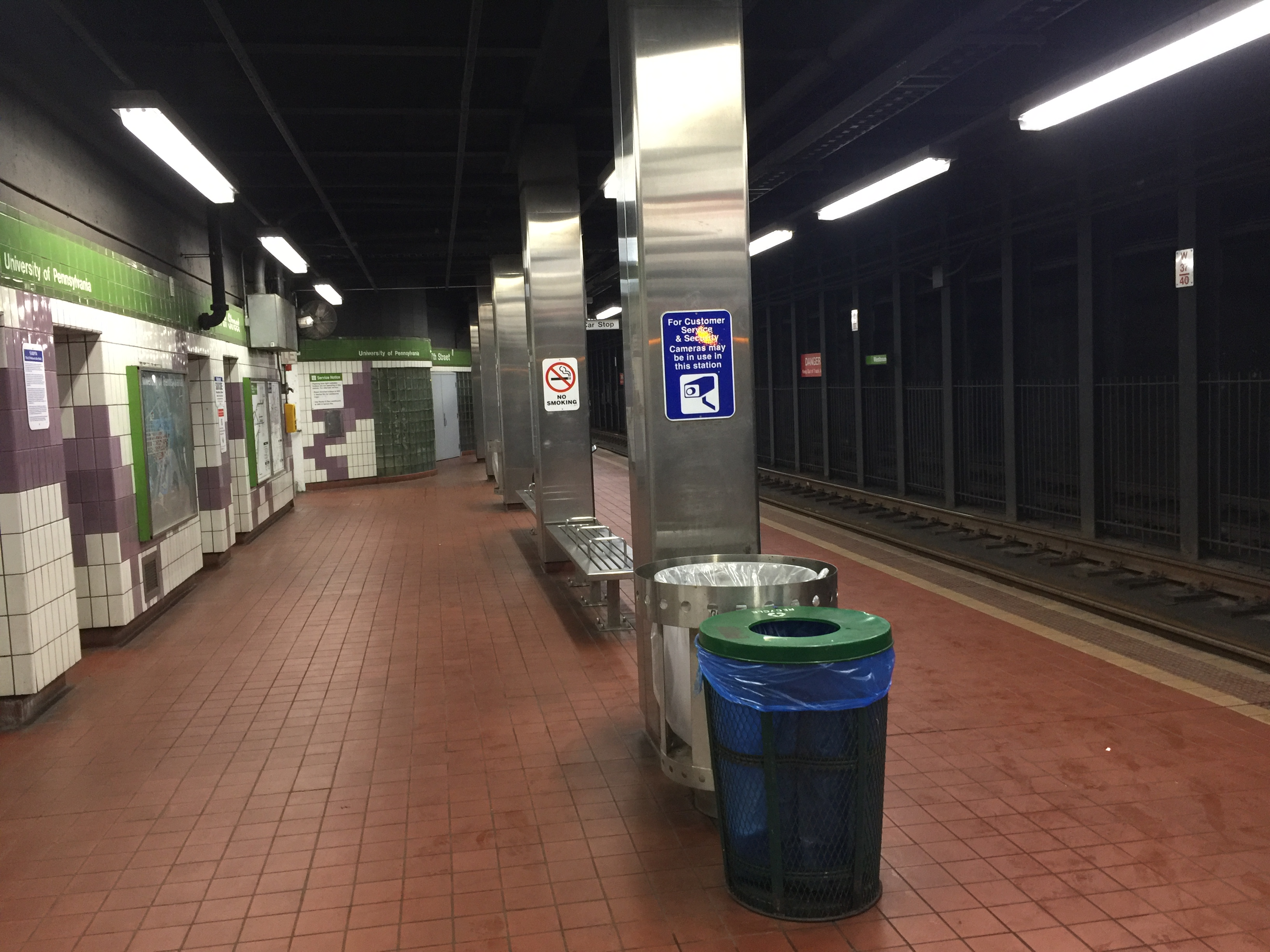

General information
- Location: 37th and Spruce streets Philadelphia, Pennsylvania
- Coordinates: 39°57′04″N 75°11′50″W
- Owner: SEPTA
- Platforms: 2 side platforms
- Tracks: 2
- Connections: SEPTA City Bus: 40

Construction
- Structure type: Underground
- Accessible: No,planned

History
- Opened: October 15, 1955

Services
Preceding station	SEPTA Metro	Following station
40th Street Portal toward 61st–Baltimore/Angora	T2 (SEPTA Metro)	36th–Sansom toward 13th Street
40th Street Portal toward Yeadon or Darby T.C.	T3 (SEPTA Metro)	36th–Sansom toward 13th Street
40th Street Portal toward Darby T.C.	T4 (SEPTA Metro)	36th–Sansom toward 13th Street
40th Street Portal toward 80th Street/Eastwick	T5 (SEPTA Metro)	36th–Sansom toward 13th Street
Location

37th–Spruce station is a SEPTA Metro T station in Philadelphia. It is the westernmost station of the trolley tunnel and carries trolley routes T2, T3, T4, and T5. The station is located on the campus of the University of Pennsylvania at the intersection of 37th and Spruce streets.

Trolleys serving this station go eastbound to Center City Philadelphia and westbound to the neighborhoods of Eastwick and Angora, as well as the Delaware County suburbs of Yeadon and Darby.

== History ==
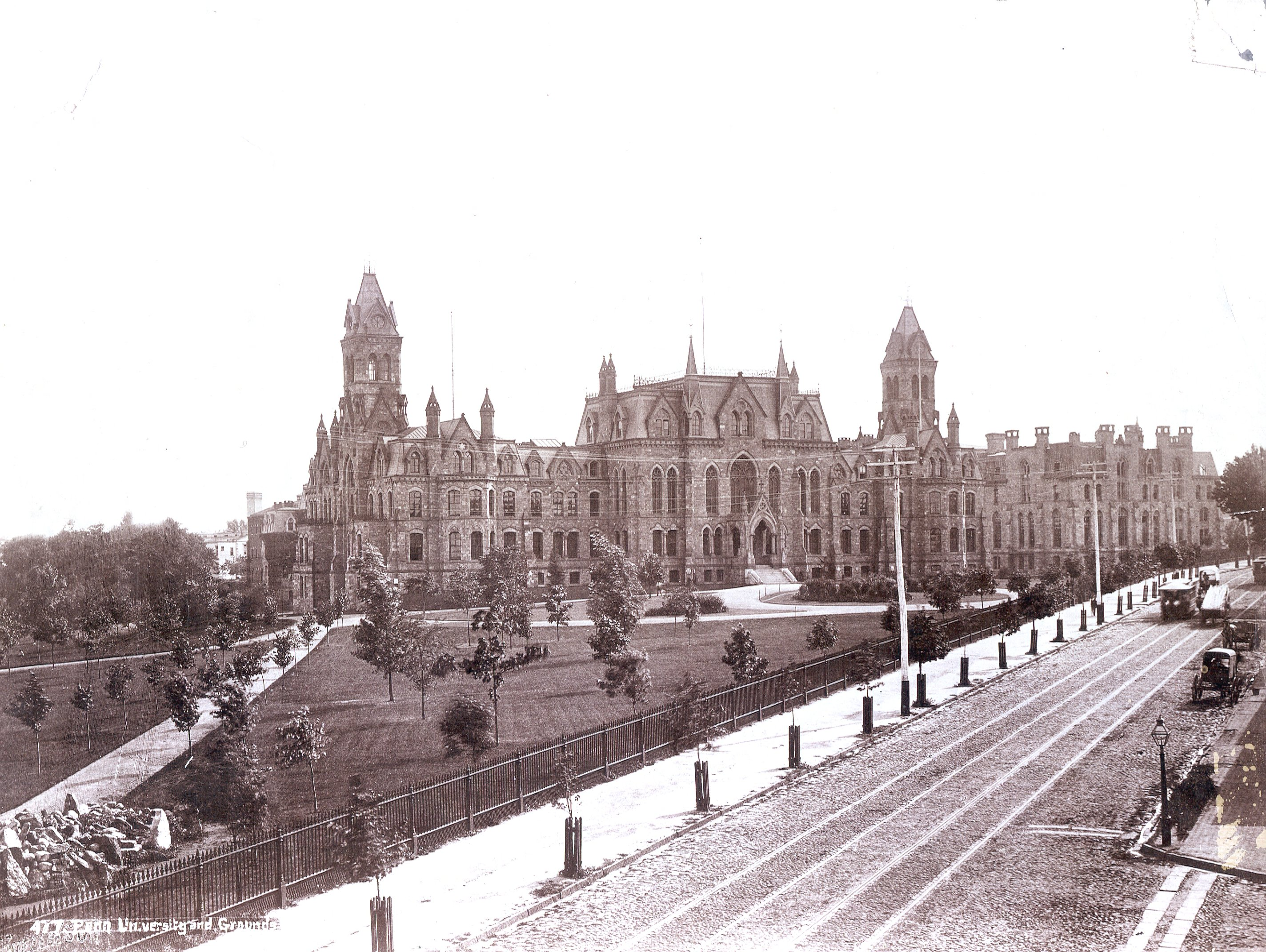
Trolley tracks on Woodland Avenue on the University of Pennsylvania campus c. 1892

The station was opened in November 1955 by the Philadelphia Transportation Company (PTC) as part of a larger project to move portions of the elevated Market Street Line and surface trolleys underground. The original project to bury the elevated tracks between 23rd to 46th streets was announced by the PTC's predecessor, the Philadelphia Rapid Transit Company (PRT), in the 1920s, but was delayed due to the Great Depression and World War II. The PTC's revised project also included a new tunnel for trolleys underneath the campus of the University of Pennsylvania, continuing from the original western portal at 23rd and Market streets to new portals at 36th and Ludlow streets and 40th Street and Baltimore Avenue.

The station's platforms are offset because during construction, the above intersection was a five-way junction between Spruce Street, Woodland Avenue, and South 37th Street. The latter two streets were later converted to pedestrian walkways.

In October 2006, Penn's class of 1956 donated a new covered headhouse for the eastbound platform entrance. The entrance is a replica of the Peter Witt trolley manufactured by J. G. Brill Company from 1923 to 1926 for Philadelphia's trolley system. The replica was built by the Gomaco Trolley Company.

== Station layout ==
The station has two low-level offset side platforms, each capable of platforming two trolleys at a time. Fares are collected on board the trolley cars.
