= 36th Street station =

36th Street station may refer to:

- 36th Street station (BMT Fourth Avenue Line), a subway station in Brooklyn, New York
- 36th Street station (BMT Fifth Avenue Line), a former elevated station in Brooklyn, New York
- 36th Street station (Charlotte), a light rail station in Charlotte, North Carolina
- 36th Street station (IND Queens Boulevard Line), a subway station in Queens, New York
- 36th Street station (River Line), a commuter rail station in Camden, New Jersey
- 36th Street Portal, a streetcar stop in Philadelphia, Pennsylvania
- 36th–Sansom station, an underground trolley station in Philadelphia, Pennsylvania
- Beach 36th Street station, an elevated station in Queens, New York
