= 33rd Street station (SEPTA) =

Subway station in Philadelphia, Pennsylvania

33rd St
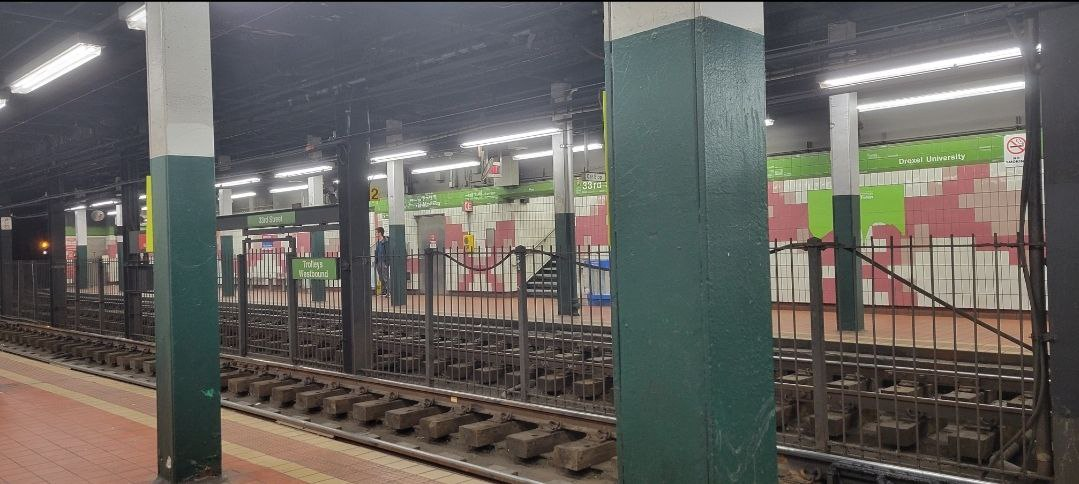

General information
- Location: 33rd and Market streets Philadelphia, Pennsylvania
- Coordinates: 39°57′20″N 75°11′22″W
- Owner: SEPTA
- Platforms: 2 side platforms
- Tracks: 2
- Connections: SEPTA City Bus: 30, 31, 49, LUCY

Construction
- Structure type: Underground
- Accessible: No, planned 1

History
- Opened: October 15, 1955
Services
Preceding station	SEPTA Metro	Following station
36th Street Portal toward 63rd–Malvern/Overbrook	T1 (SEPTA Metro)	Drexel Station at 30th Street toward 13th Street
36th–Sansom toward 61st–Baltimore/Angora	T2 (SEPTA Metro)	Drexel Station at 30th Street toward 13th Street
36th–Sansom toward Yeadon or Darby T.C.	T3 (SEPTA Metro)	Drexel Station at 30th Street toward 13th Street
36th–Sansom toward Darby T.C.	T4 (SEPTA Metro)	Drexel Station at 30th Street toward 13th Street
36th–Sansom toward 80th Street/Eastwick	T5 (SEPTA Metro)	Drexel Station at 30th Street toward 13th Street
Location

33rd Street station is a subway station in Philadelphia, Pennsylvania, serving all trolleys of the SEPTA Metro T. It is the last station of the T outbound with all lines before the T1 splits away and exits the tunnel at 36th Street Portal. The stop is located on the campus of Drexel University.

== History ==
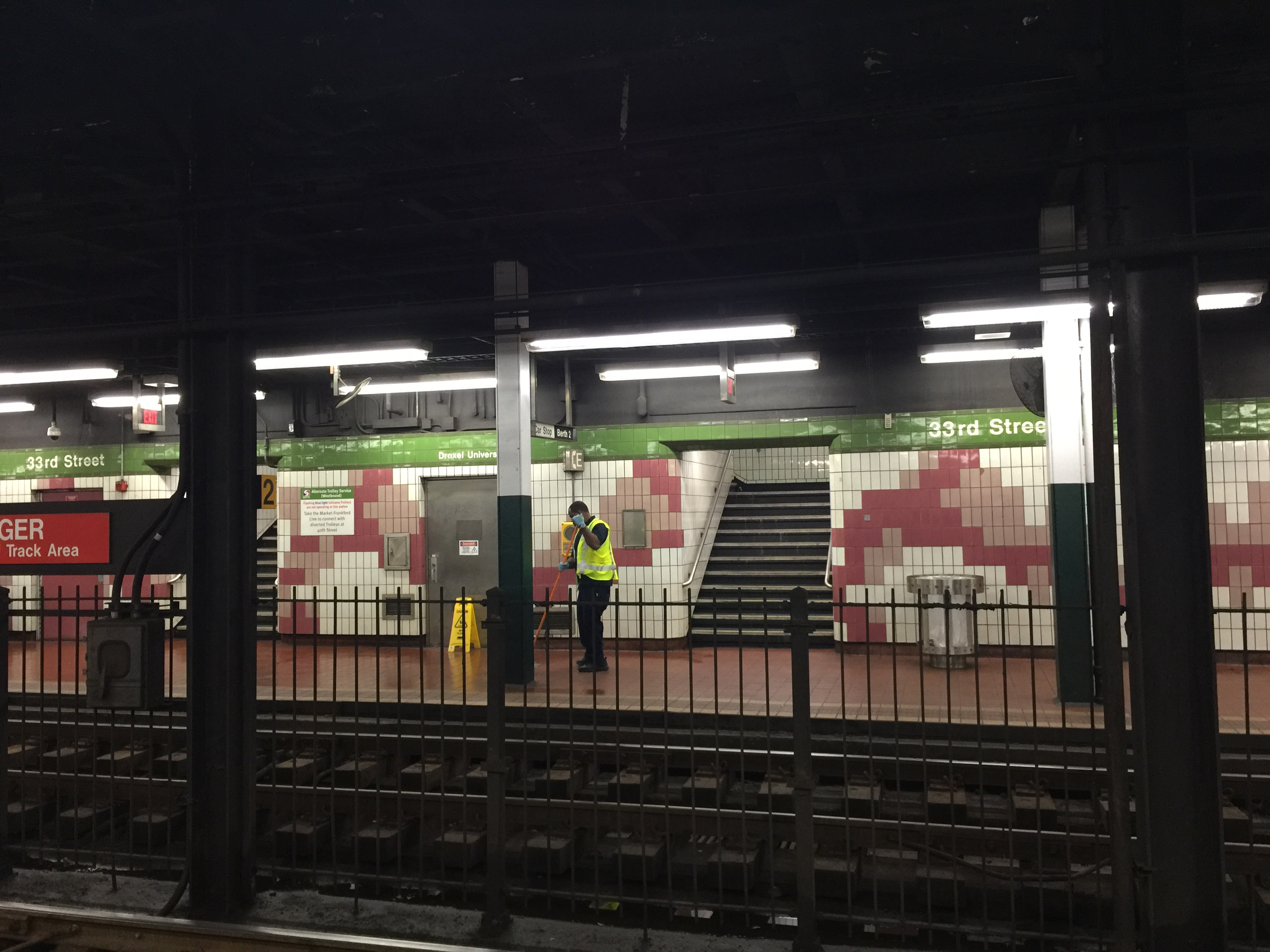
Platform level at 33rd Street

The station was opened in November 1955 by the Philadelphia Transportation Company (PTC) as part of a larger project to move portions of the elevated Market Street Line and surface trolleys underground. The original project to bury the elevated tracks between 23rd to 46th streets was announced by the PTC's predecessor, the Philadelphia Rapid Transit Company, in the 1920s, but was delayed due to the Great Depression and World War II. The PTC's revised project also included a new subway–surface tunnel for subway–surface trolleys underneath the campus of the University of Pennsylvania, continuing from the original western portal at 23rd and Market streets to new portals at 36th and Ludlow streets for Route 10 and 40th Street and Baltimore Avenue for other routes.

On April 11, 1988, a trolley derailed at the station, injuring 27 people.

On 27 July 2023, SEPTA awarded a $4,987,421 contract to CDM Smith, Inc. for architectural and design services to make 22nd, 33rd, and 36th stations accessible and making general station improvements such as new lighting and signage.

== Station layout ==
The station has two entrances, one on Market Street, and one on 33rd Street, both being stairwells leading down into the mezzanine. Thus, the station is not ADA accessible. The mezzanine has ventilation wells on the east and west sides. The station has two low-level side platforms, each capable of platforming two trolleys at a time. Fares are collected on board trolleys.
