= 36th–Sansom station =

Subway station in Philadelphia, Pennsylvania

36th–Sansom
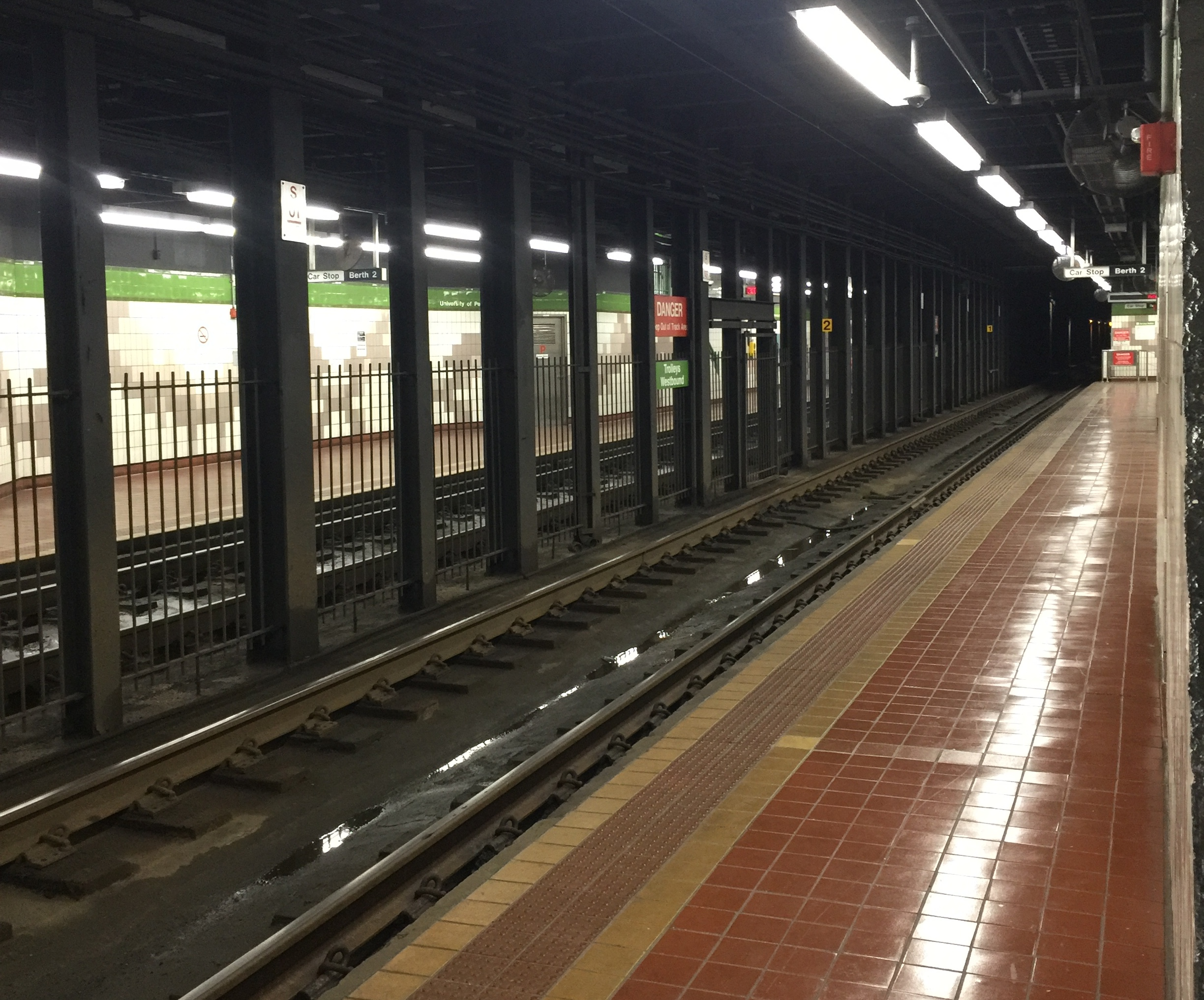

General information
- Location: 36th and Sansom streets Philadelphia, Pennsylvania, U.S.
- Coordinates: 39°57′14″N 75°11′41″W
- Owner: SEPTA
- Platforms: 2 side platforms
- Tracks: 2
- Connections: SEPTA City Bus: 21

Construction
- Structure type: Underground
- Accessible: No, planned 1

History
- Opened: November 1955
- Former names: 36th Street (1955–2025)

Services
Preceding station	SEPTA Metro	Following station
37th–Spruce toward 61st–Baltimore/Angora	T2 (SEPTA Metro)	33rd Street toward 13th Street
37th–Spruce toward Yeadon or Darby T.C.	T3 (SEPTA Metro)	33rd Street toward 13th Street
37th–Spruce toward Darby T.C.	T4 (SEPTA Metro)	33rd Street toward 13th Street
37th–Spruce toward 80th Street/Eastwick	T5 (SEPTA Metro)	33rd Street toward 13th Street
Location

36th–Sansom station is a SEPTA Metro trolley station in Philadelphia. It is located at the intersection of Sansom and 36th streets, and serves Routes T2, T3, T4, and T5 of the T. Trolleys serving this station go eastbound to Center City Philadelphia and westbound to the neighborhoods of Eastwick and Angora, as well as the Delaware County suburbs of Yeadon and Darby.

The station is located adjacent to the Institute of Contemporary Art and is two blocks away from the 36th Street Portal station, which serves the T1 trolley.

== History ==
The station was opened in November 1955 by the Philadelphia Transportation Company (PTC) as part of a larger project to move portions of the elevated Market Street Line and surface trolleys underground. The original project to bury the elevated tracks between 23rd to 46th streets was announced by the PTC's predecessor, the Philadelphia Rapid Transit Company (PRT), in the 1920s, but was delayed due to the Great Depression and World War II. The PTC's revised project also included a new tunnel for trolleys underneath the campus of the University of Pennsylvania, continuing from the original western portal at 23rd and Market streets to new portals at 36th and Ludlow streets and 40th Street and Baltimore Avenue.

== Station layout ==
The station has two low-level side platforms, each capable of platforming two trolleys at a time. Fares are collected on board the trolley cars.
