= Angora station =

Urban railway station in Philadelphia, USA

Angora
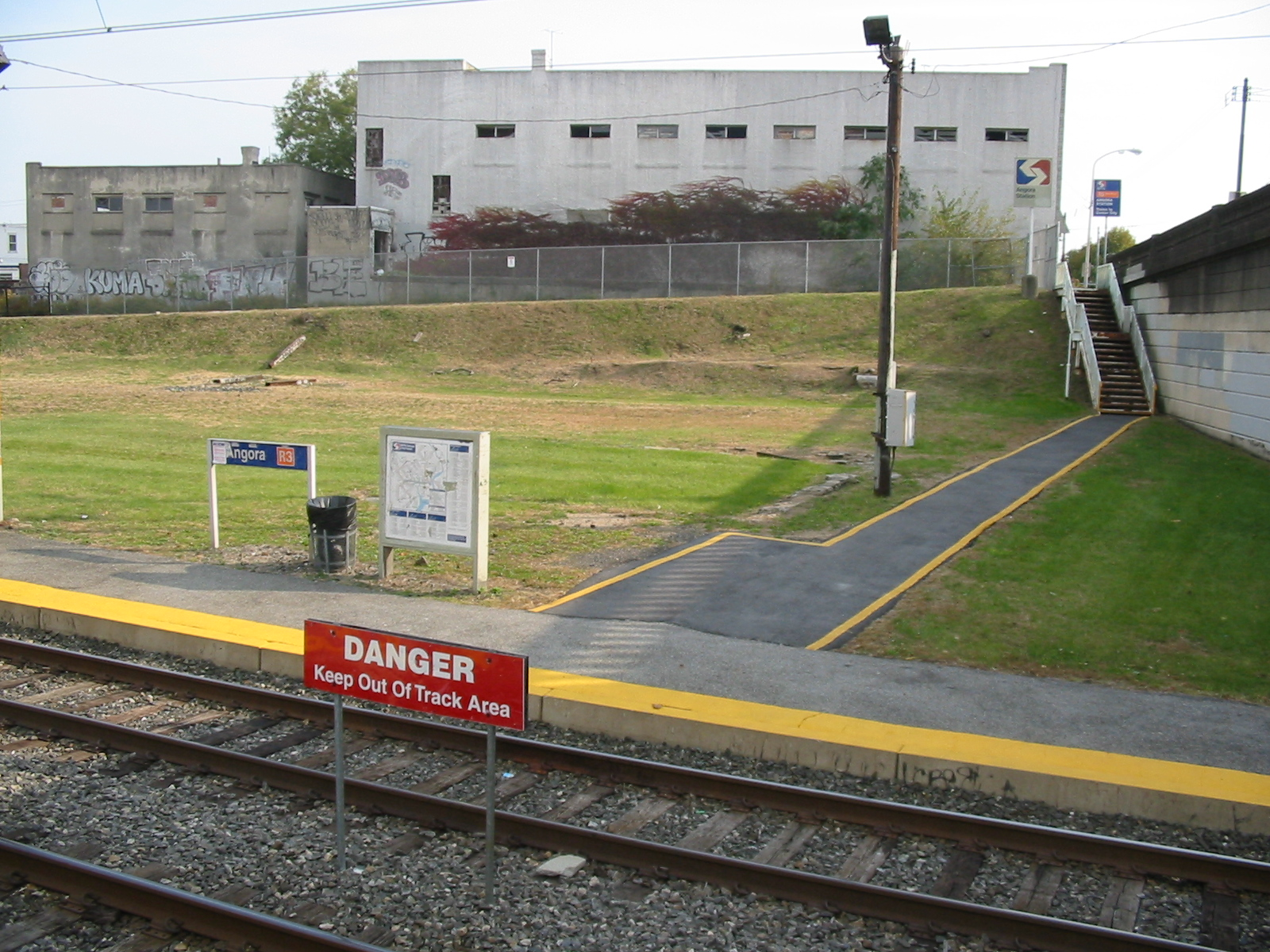
- Facing south from westbound side of tracks.

General information
- Location: 1099 South 58th Street; Philadelphia, Pennsylvania
- Coordinates: 39.94479°N 75.23867°W
- Owner: SEPTA
- Platforms: 2 side platforms
- Tracks: 2
- Connections: SEPTA Metro: at 58th–Baltimore; SEPTA City Bus: 63

Construction
- Accessible: No

Other information
- Fare zone: 1

History
- Electrified: December 2, 1928

Services
Preceding station	SEPTA	Following station
Fernwood–Yeadon toward Wawa Station	Media/Wawa Line	49th Street toward Temple University
Preceding station	SEPTA Metro	Following station
61st–Baltimore/Angora Terminus	major stops	40th Street Portal toward 13th Street
Former services
Preceding station	Pennsylvania Railroad	Following station
Fernwood toward West Chester	West Chester Line	49th Street toward Suburban Station
Location

Angora station is a SEPTA railway station in Philadelphia. It serves the Media/Wawa Line and is officially located at 58th Street near Baltimore Avenue in Southwest Philadelphia's Angora neighborhood, however the actual location is south of Baltimore Avenue. Part of Cobbs Creek Parkway runs along 58th Street from Baltimore Avenue, over the railroad bridge, to nearby Hoffman Avenue. In 2013, this station saw 36 boardings and 37 alightings on an average weekday, making it SEPTA's least used regional rail station.

Angora station lies several blocks southeast of 61st–Baltimore/Angora station, which is the western terminus of the T2 on the SEPTA Metro T, a trolley route that runs along Baltimore Avenue, three blocks north of the station. Connections to the T2 are made at 58th Street and Baltimore Avenue adjacent to this station.

== Station layout ==
Angora has two low-level side platforms.
