= Drexel Station at 30th Street =

Rapid transit station in Philadelphia

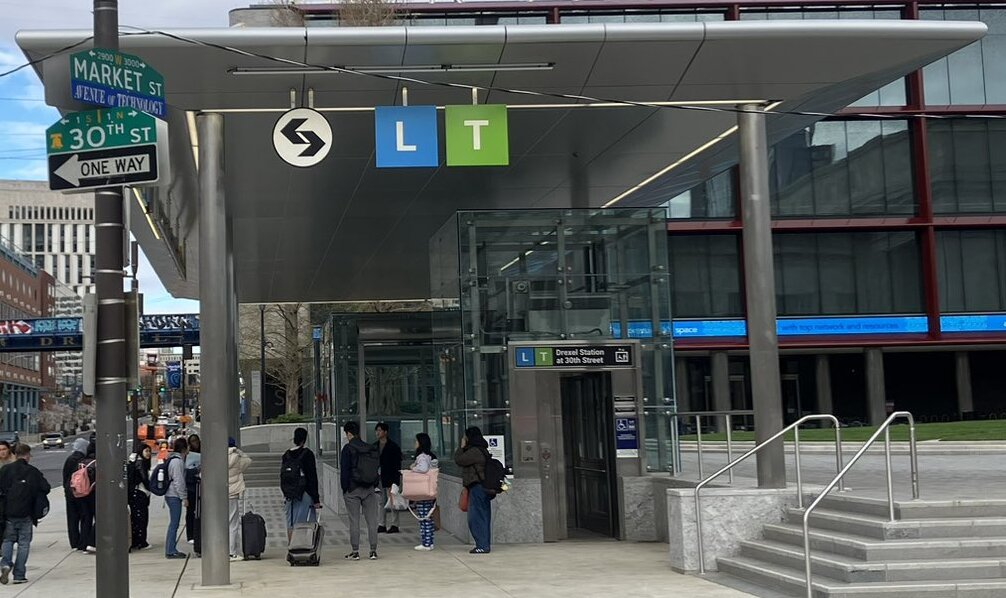
- Primary entrance at the northwest corner of 30th and Market streets in April 2024

General information
- Location: 30th and Market streets Philadelphia, Pennsylvania
- Coordinates: 39°57′18″N 75°11′01″W
- Owner: SEPTA
- Platforms: 1 island (L); 2 side (T)
- Tracks: 4
- Connections: Amtrak, NJ Transit Rail, SEPTA Regional Rail (at 30th Street Station); SEPTA City Bus: 9, 30, 31, 44, 49, LUCY; SEPTA Suburban Bus: 124, 125; NJ Transit Bus: 316, 414, 417, 555

Construction
- Structure type: Underground
- Accessible: Yes (L); Accessible from street to station platform, vehicles are not accessible (T)

History
- Opened: November 6, 1955
- Rebuilt: 2024
- Former names: 30th Street (1955–2024)
Services
Preceding station	SEPTA Metro	Following station
34th Street toward 69th Street T.C.	L (SEPTA Metro)	15th Street/City Hall toward Frankford T.C.
33rd Street toward 63rd–Malvern/Overbrook	T1 (SEPTA Metro)	22nd Street toward 13th Street
33rd Street toward 61st–Baltimore/Angora	T2 (SEPTA Metro)	22nd Street toward 13th Street
33rd Street toward Yeadon or Darby T.C.	T3 (SEPTA Metro)	22nd Street toward 13th Street
33rd Street toward Darby T.C.	T4 (SEPTA Metro)	22nd Street toward 13th Street
33rd Street toward 80th Street/Eastwick	T5 (SEPTA Metro)	22nd Street toward 13th Street
Location

Drexel Station at 30th Street (known as 30th Street station prior to 2024) is an underground SEPTA Metro station in Philadelphia. It is located under Market Street between 30th and 31st streets in the University City neighborhood, adjacent to 30th Street Station and Drexel University. The station features four tracks – the inner pair serving the L and the outer pair for the T.

== History ==
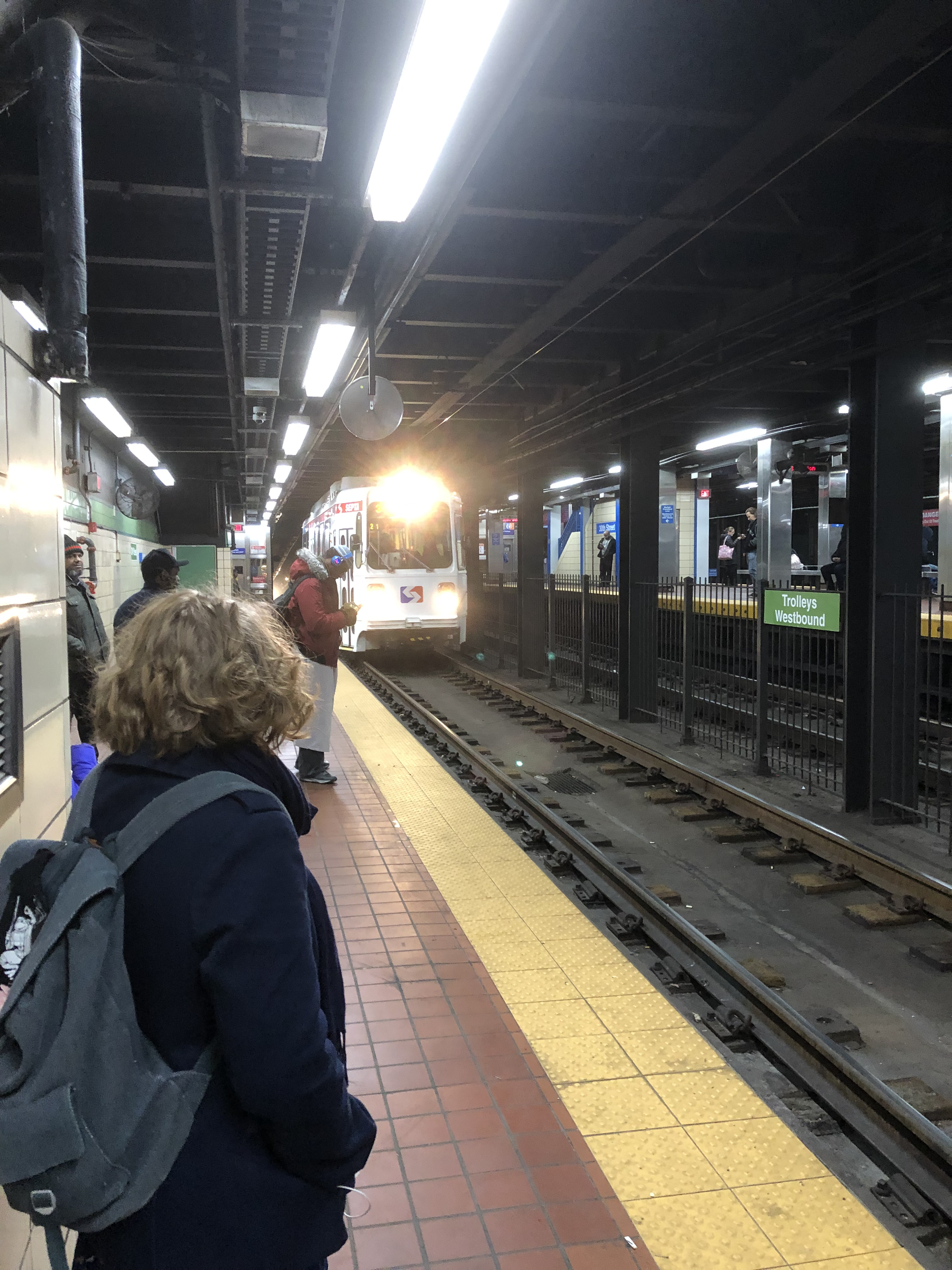
Trolley platform at 30th Street prior to renovation

The station opened on November 6, 1955, by the Philadelphia Transportation Company (PTC), built as a replacement for the elevated 32nd Street station that had opened in 1907 as part of the Philadelphia Rapid Transit Company's original Market Street subway–elevated line from 69th Street to 15th Street, which was elevated west of 23rd Street.

The PRT announced a project to bury the elevated tracks between 23rd to 46th streets in the 1920s. The tunnel from 23rd to 32nd streets was completed by 1933, but construction on the remaining segment was put on hiatus due to the Great Depression and World War II. The PRT went bankrupt in 1939 and was reorganized as the PTC, which began building the rest of the tunnel in 1947.

The underground station is half a block southwest of 30th Street Station, the city's main intercity rail and commuter rail station. A tunnel previously connected the two stations, but was closed in the 1980s, reportedly due to safety concerns. Amtrak and SEPTA considered reopening the tunnel in the early 2000s, but the September 11 attacks ended those plans.

In December 2018, SEPTA received a $15 million grant from the United States Department of Transportation to make significant improvements to the station. The improvement project was projected to cost over $37 million, with remaining funds contributed by SEPTA's capital budget and the developer Brandywine Realty Trust, which owns 3000-3020 Market Street directly above the subway station and is planning the Schuylkill Yards megaproject. The project calls for improvements to the station's mezzanine, as well as reopening and renovating the underground concourse connecting the subway station with the main 30th Street Station building. A second access point to the station at the corner of 31st and Market streets reopened in late 2019, which includes a staircase and new elevator. The full project was expected to be completed in 2021, but was not finished until April 2024.

The 30th Street Station District, a development plan, called for the station house at the northwest corner of 30th and Market streets to be rebuilt. Work began on station renovations in 2020. On December 21, 2023, SEPTA announced that Drexel University had bought naming rights to the station for five years, which would change the station name to Drexel Station at 30th Street. New signage with the name, the first to adhere to SEPTA Metro, was added in February 2024. The name change officially took effect when the renovated station opened in April 2024.

== Station layout ==
The station has a high-level island platform for Market–Frankford trains and two low-level side platforms for subway–surface trolleys.

== Bus connections ==
In addition to rail services, the station is also served by numerous bus routes including routes 9, 30, 31, 44, 49, 62, 78, and LUCY operated by the SEPTA City Transit Division, routes 124 and 125 operated by the SEPTA Suburban Division, and NJ Transit bus routes 313, 315, 414, 417, and 555 serving New Jersey.

== Image gallery ==
Post-renovation

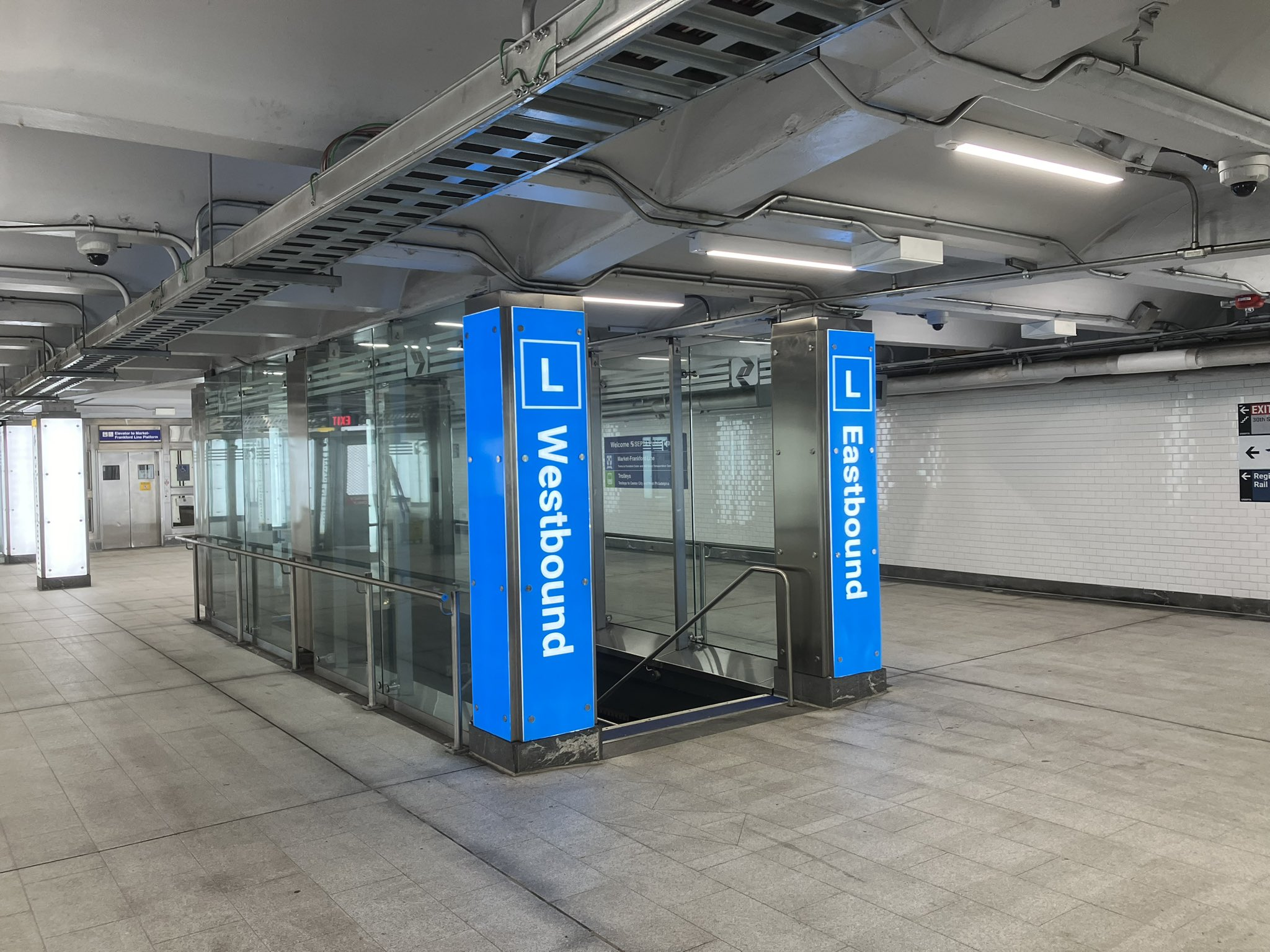
L platform entrance

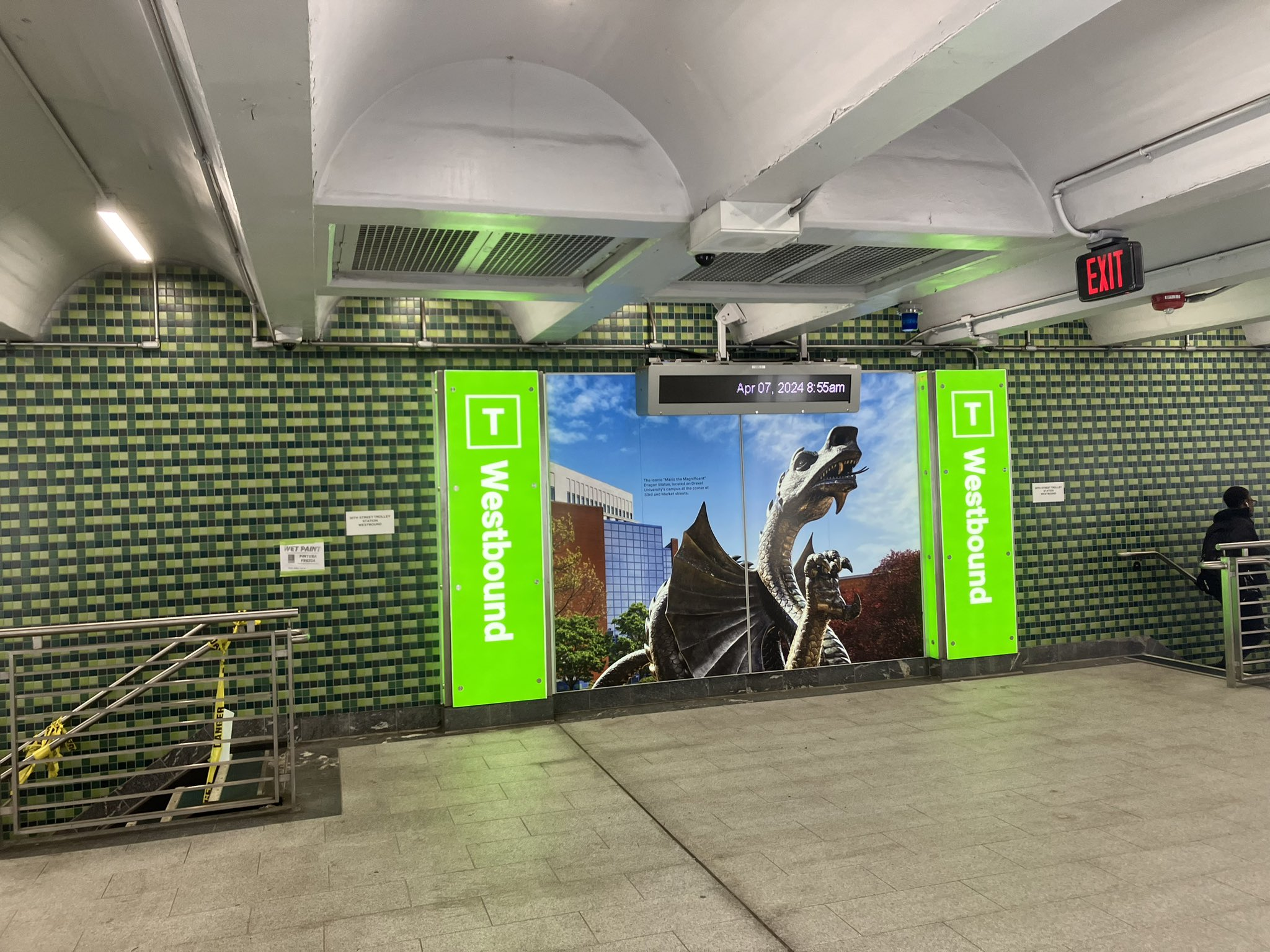
Westbound T platform entrance
Pre-renovation

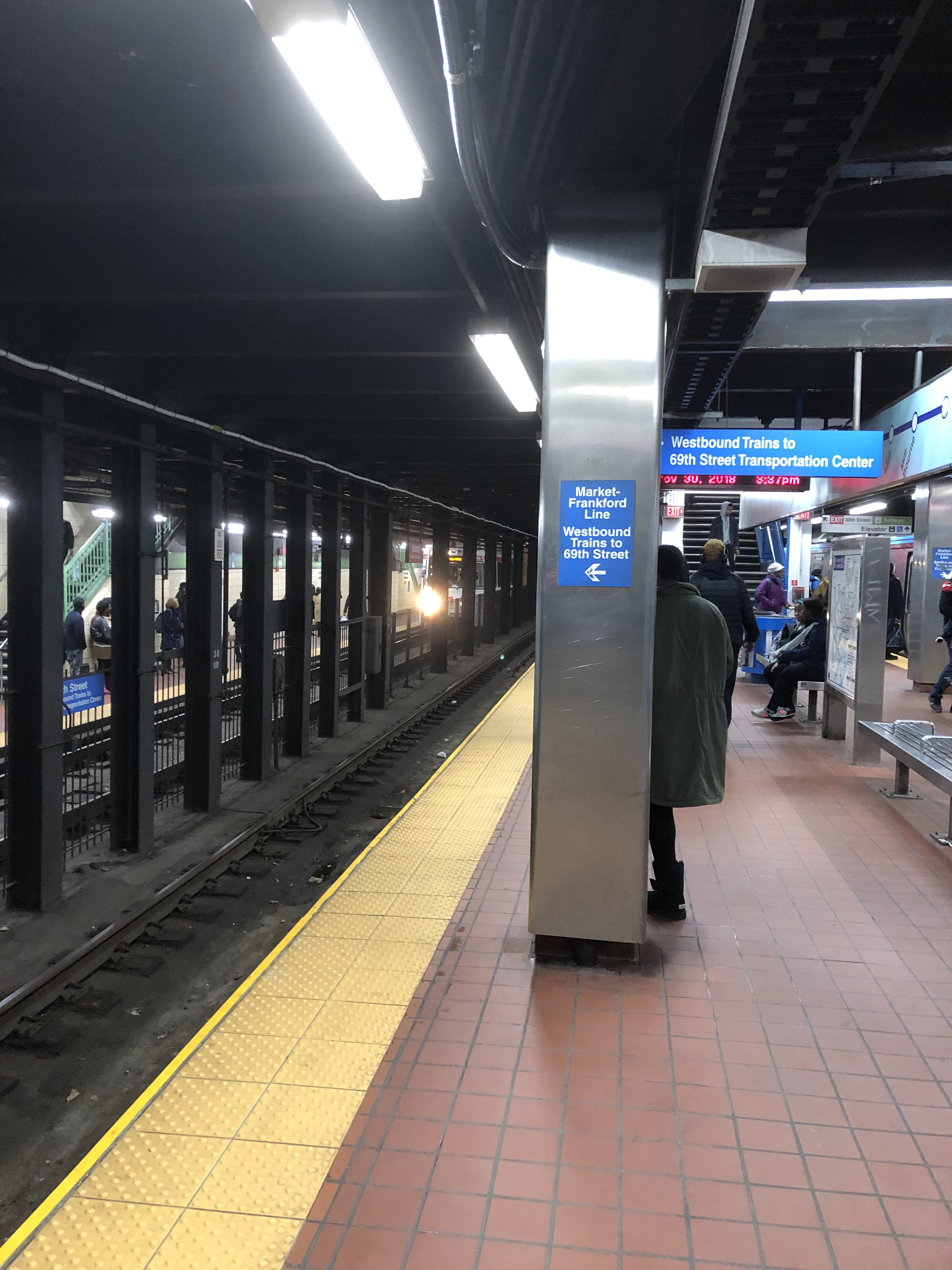
L platform

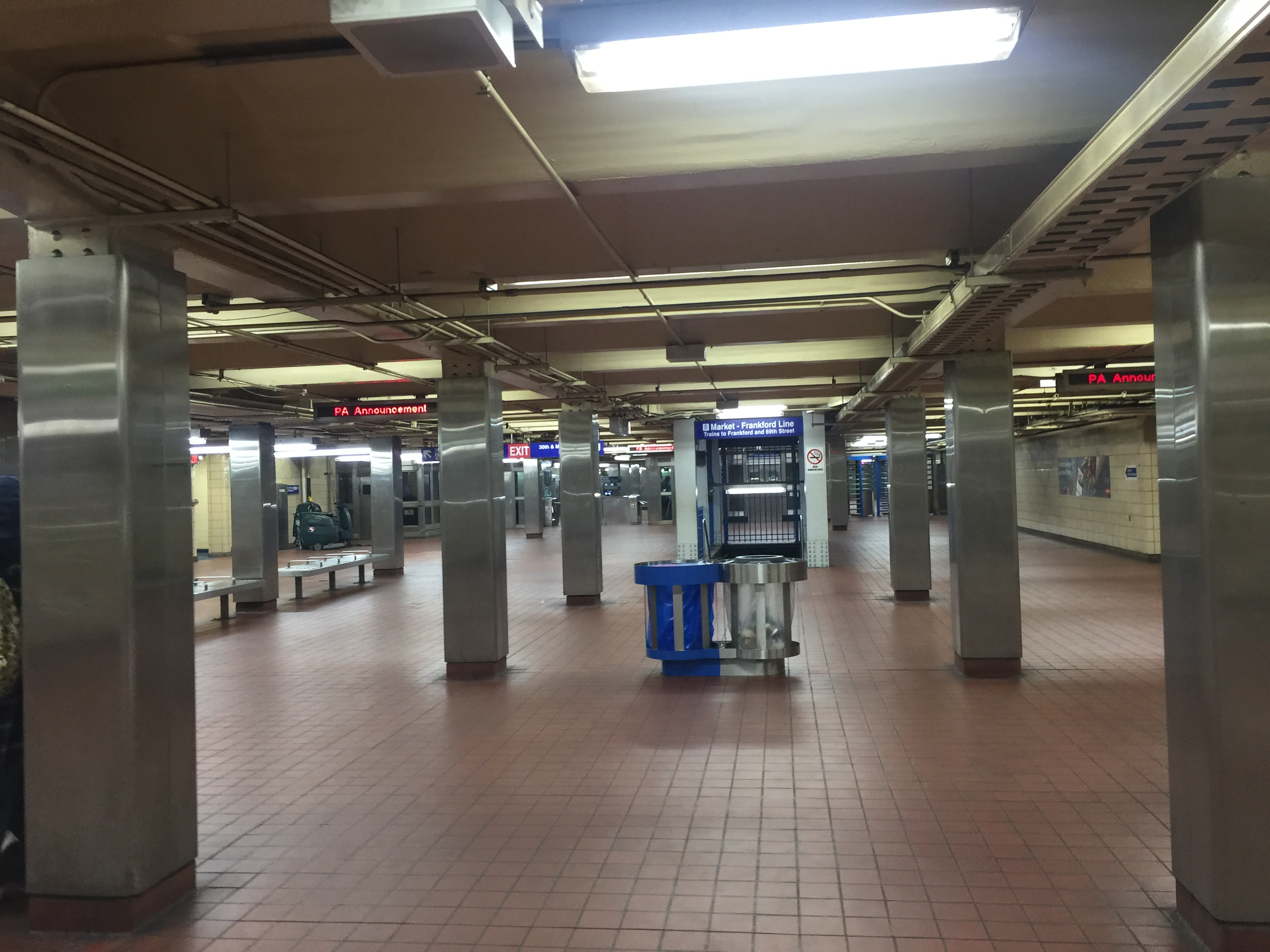
Free transfer zone in 30th Street station

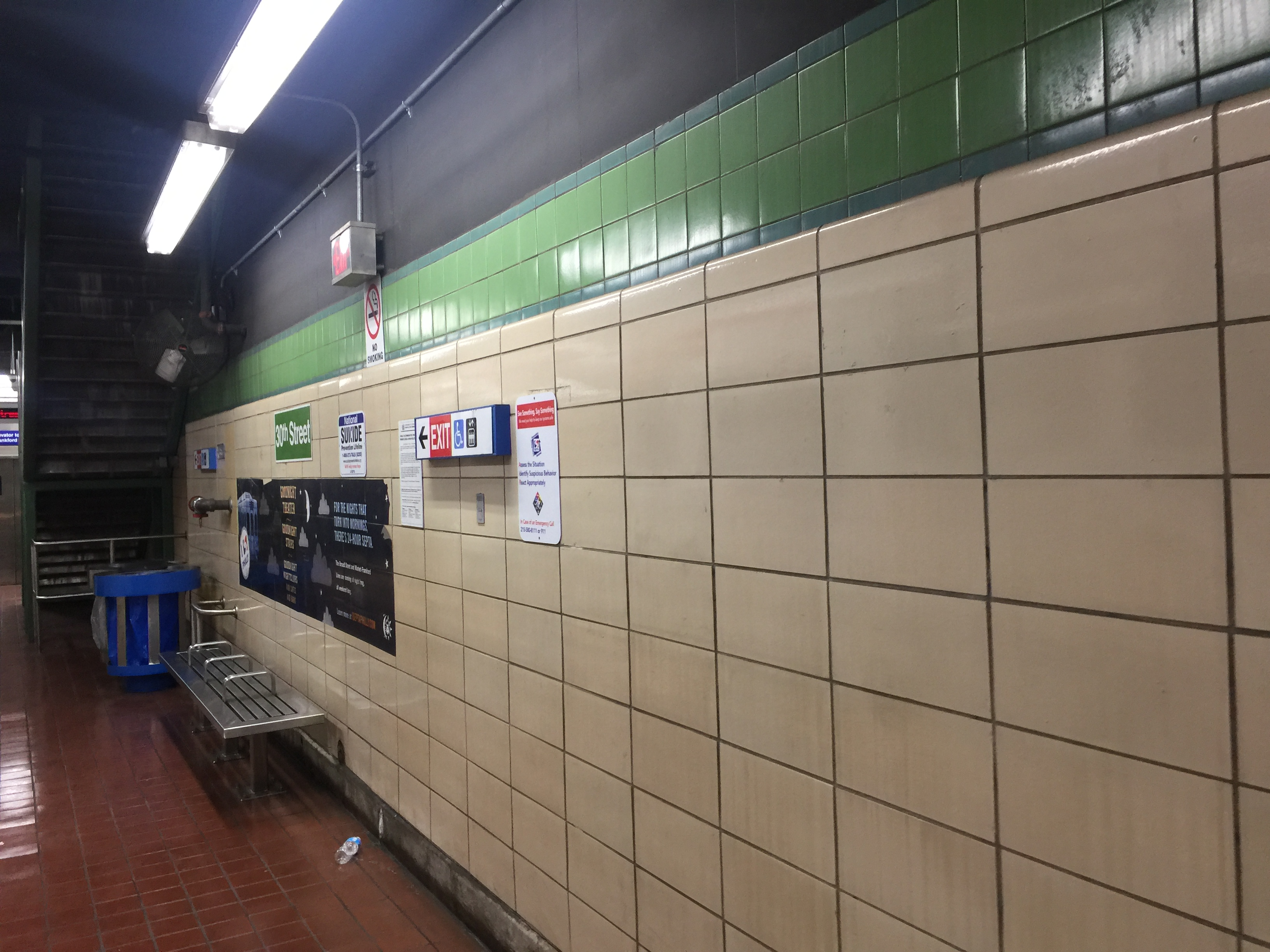
T platform

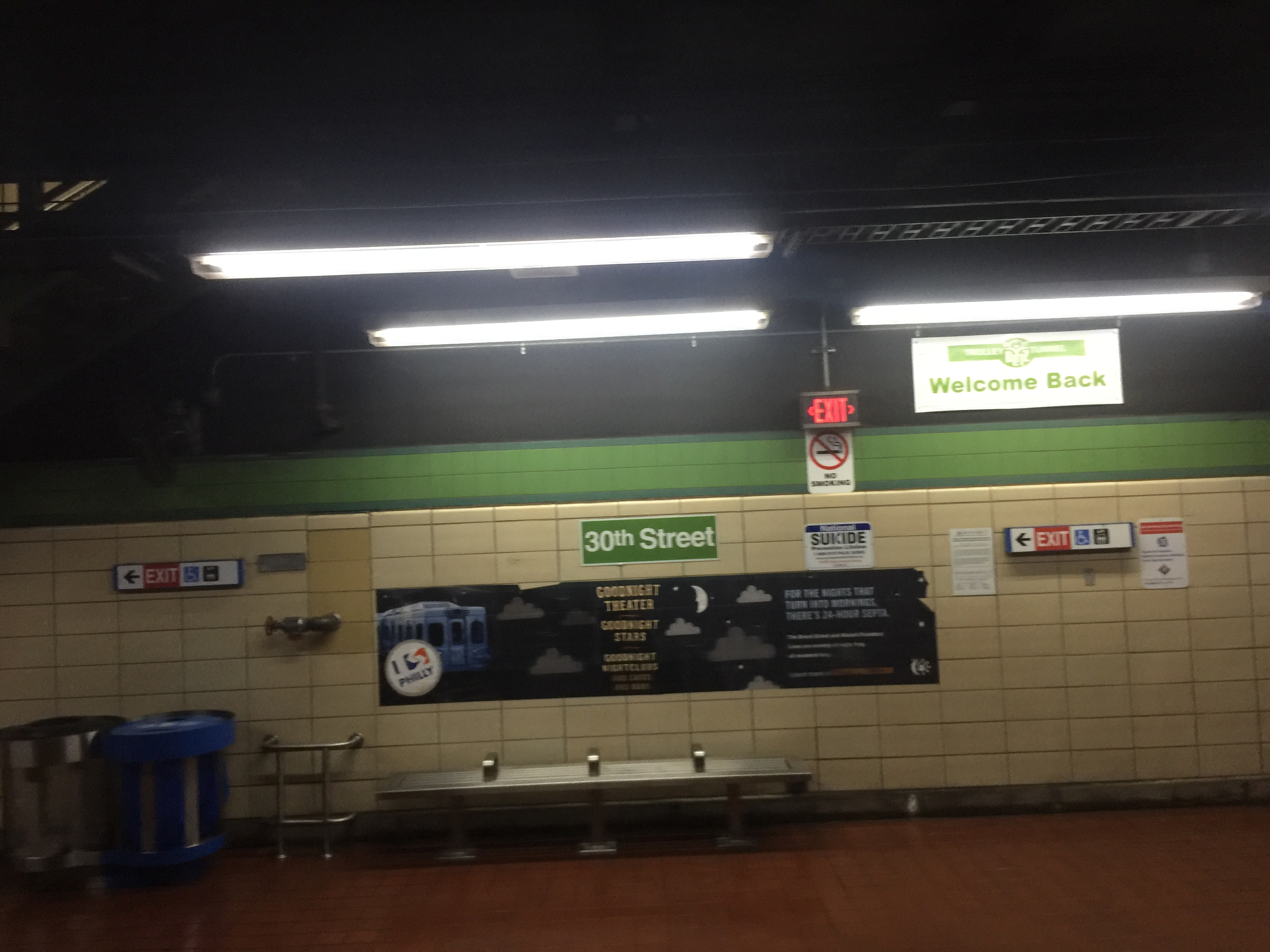
T platform

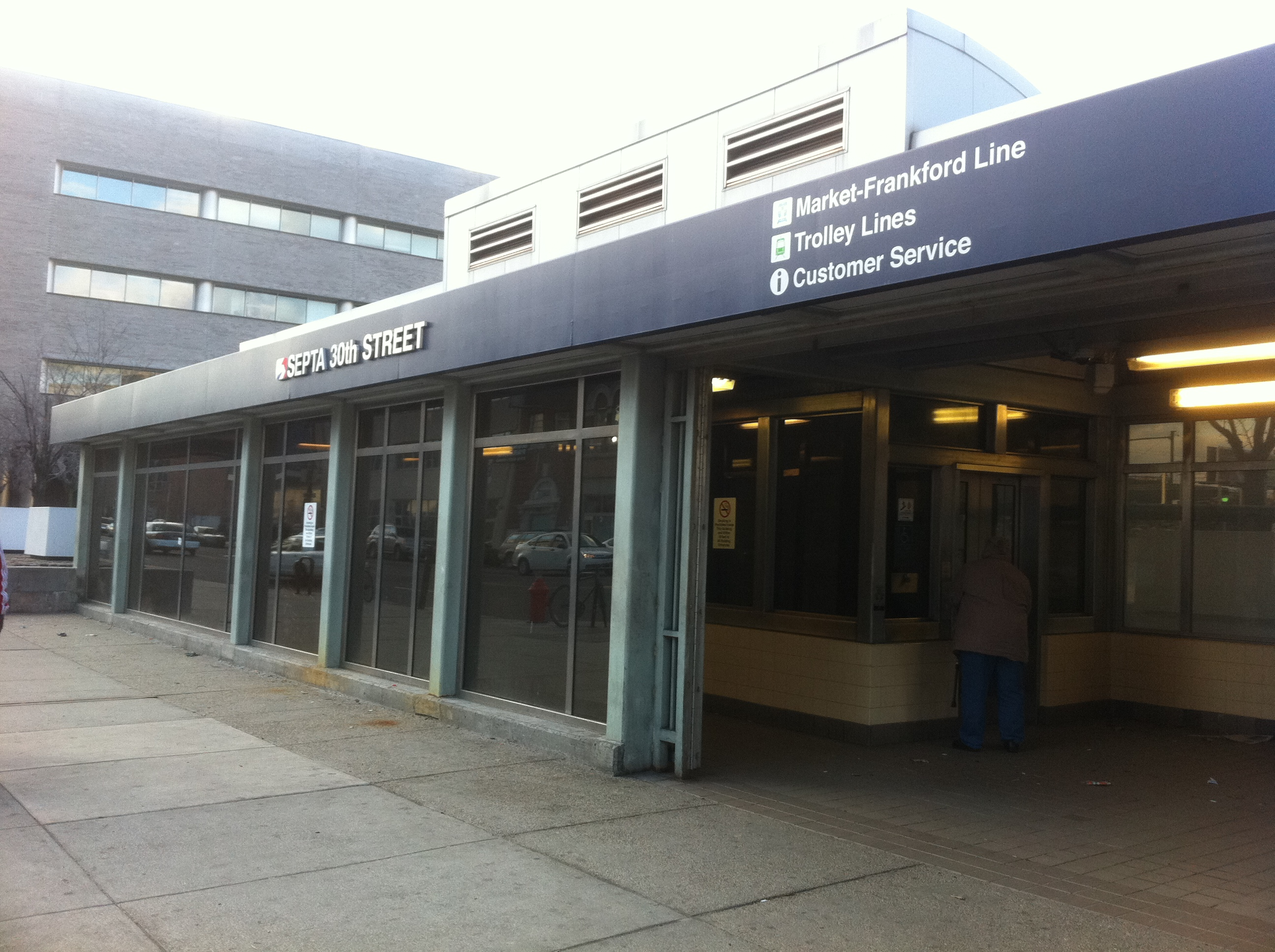
Former 30th Street station entrance

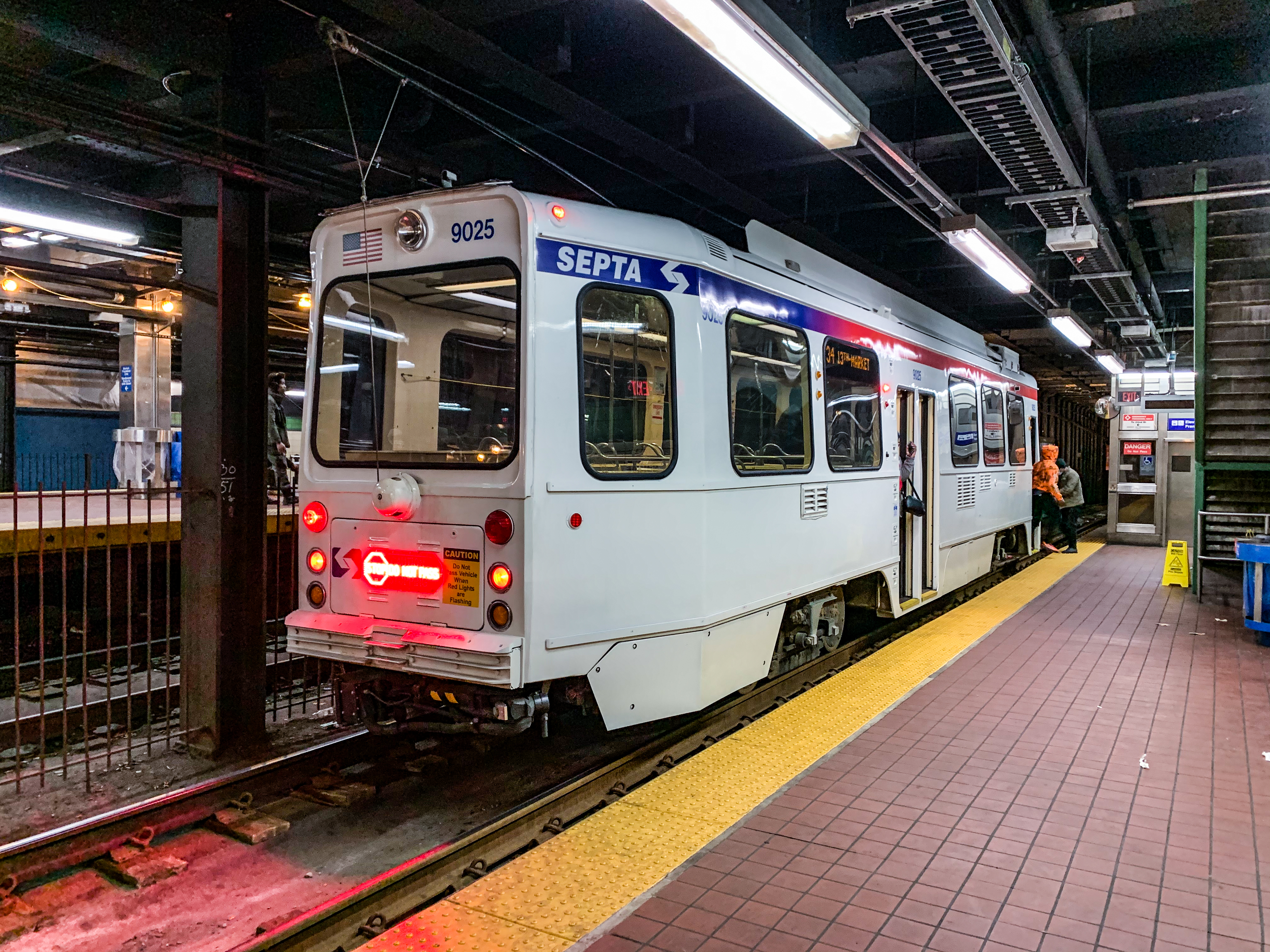
Trolley car at eastbound platform
