= T3 (SEPTA) =

Light rail line in Philadelphia, Pennsylvania

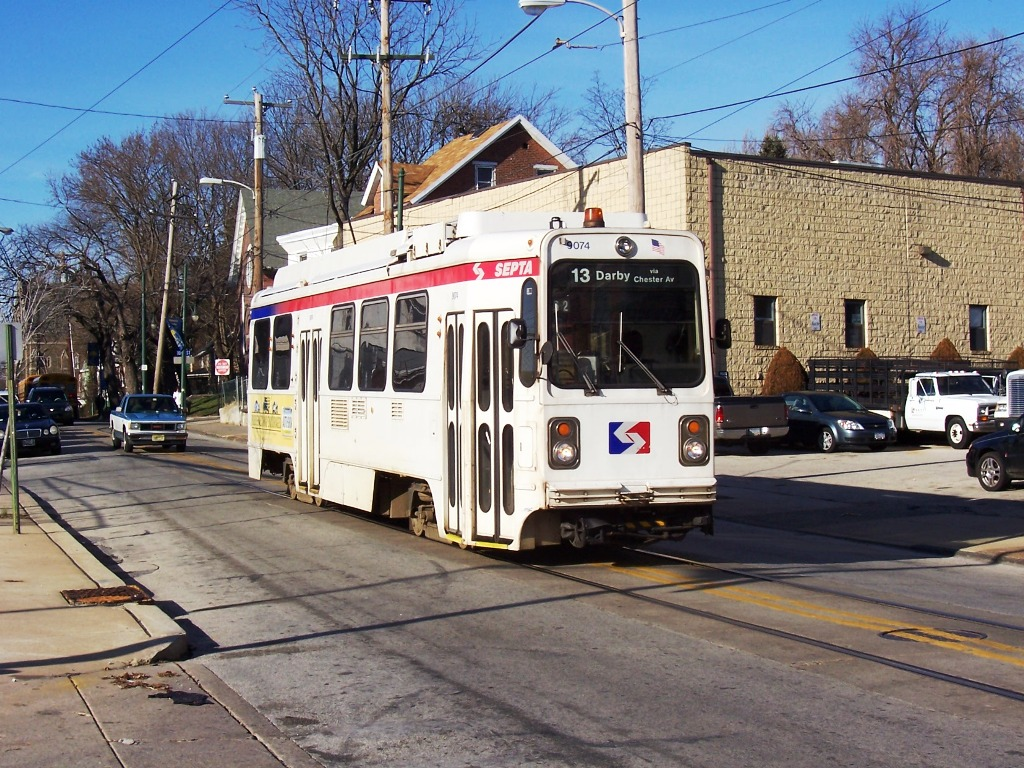
- A trolley on Main Street in Darby in 2006

Overview
- Termini: 13th Street; Yeadon or Darby Transit Center
- Stations: 8 underground stations, 1 surface level station, and 44 street-level stops

Service
- Type: Trolley
- System: SEPTA Metro
- Depot: Elmwood Carhouse
- Daily ridership: 13,364 (2019 average weekday)

Technical
- Line length: 11.4 mi (18.3 km)
- Track gauge: 5 ft 2 1/4 in (1,581 mm) Pennsylvania trolley gauge
- Electrification: Overhead line, 600 V DC
Route map
Template:T3 (SEPTA)

The T3, formerly Route 13, is a trolley line that connects 13th Street station in Center City, Philadelphia, with Yeadon and Darby, Pennsylvania. It is one of the five T services of the SEPTA Metro.

== Route description ==
Starting from its eastern end at the 13th Street, the T3 runs in a tunnel under Market Street. It makes stops at underground stations at 15th Street/City Hall, 19th Street, 22nd Street, Drexel Station at 30th Street, and 33rd Street. From 15th to 30th Streets, it runs on the outer tracks of the Market Street subway, beside the L.

Passengers may transfer free of charge to the L at 13th Street, 15th Street/City Hall, and Drexel Station at 30th Street and to the B at 15th Street. Connections to the SEPTA Regional Rail are also available. Underground passageways connect the 13th Street and 15th Street/City Hall Stations to Jefferson Station and Suburban Station.

The T3 surfaces at the 40th Street Portal near 40th Street and Baltimore Avenue (US 13), and then runs southwest along Woodland Avenue shortly before moving to Chester Avenue. An alternate line existing along 42nd Street itself joins the T3 for several blocks. This line is used when tunnels are closed for maintenance or other unforeseen shutdowns. The line runs on a bridge over the Media/Wawa Line at 49th Street, however, it does not serve as an official stop as it is located at the intersection of 49th Street and Chester Avenue just east of the station. A track along 49th Street allows for T3 service cutbacks, and is the pull-in/pull-out route for the T4 to access Baltimore Avenue a few blocks north.

Mount Moriah Cemetery cuts off Chester Avenue at 61st Street, so the line makes a left turn at 60th Street then returns to the southwest at Kingsessing Avenue. At the southwest corner of the cemetery, the line stops at the Mount Moriah station, and some LRVs use the loop since they do not go to either Yeadon or Darby. For those that do, they continue west on Kingsessing Avenue until it reaches 65th Street where it turns northwest. At Chester Avenue, 65th Street is staggered and the line navigates a left hand S-turn to rejoin 65th Street north of Chester Avenue. The line continues northwest along 65th Street and crosses over the Cobbs Creek Parkway, as well as Cobbs Creek which separates Philadelphia and Delaware Counties. It then immediately turns onto another section of Chester Avenue, on its way to Yeadon station. Fernwood–Yeadon station is further north of this terminus and has no connection. However the SEPTA Suburban Bus Routes 68 and 108, which do lead to Fernwood-Yeadon cross the line east of Yeadon Loop at the Church Lane intersection.

West of Yeadon Loop, some LRVs continue along Chester Avenue until it reaches its terminus at Cedar Avenue, where westbound and eastbound tracks split along 10th Street and 9th Street respectively. The tracks on 10th Street run straight, while those on 9th Street briefly run along Summit Street. At Main Street, where 10th Street ends, the westbound tracks turn left and proceed south to the next block at Darby Transit Center, which is primarily served by the T4, as well as numerous Suburban Division buses. Although service ends at Darby Transit Center, the tracks continue east along Main Street to access Elmwood District along the tracks of the T4.

== History ==
Trolley service on the T3, then Route 13, originally operated from Yeadon to Front & Chestnut Streets via Chestnut and Walnut Streets. Service was rerouted into the Subway-Surface Tunnel on September 9, 1956.

Service to was extended to Darby following the discontinuation of the Route 62 Darby–Yeadon shuttle trolley on January 24, 1971.

Route 13 was renamed as the T3 on February 24, 2025.

== Stations and stops ==
All are in the City of Philadelphia or the boroughs of Yeadon or Darby.

Neighborhood/ location	Station or stop	Connections	Notes
Market East	13th Street	SEPTA Metro: SEPTA City Bus: 27, 31, 32	Closed between 12:30–5:00am
Penn Center	15th Street/City Hall	SEPTA Regional Rail: all lines (at Suburban); SEPTA Metro: SEPTA City Bus: 4, 16, 17, 27, 31, 32, 33, 38, 44, 48; SEPTA Suburban Bus: 124, 125	Late night terminus
Penn Center	19th Street	SEPTA Metro: SEPTA City Bus: 17, 31, 38, 44, 48; SEPTA Suburban Bus: 124	
Center City; West	22nd Street	SEPTA Metro: SEPTA City Bus: 7, 31, 44; SEPTA Suburban Bus: 124, 125	Replaced 24th Street station
University City	Drexel Station at 30th Street	Amtrak (at 30th Street); NJ Transit: ACL Atlantic City Line (at 30th Street); SEPTA Regional Rail: all lines (at 30th Street); SEPTA Metro: SEPTA City Bus: 31, 49, LUCY	No direct passage to 30th Street Station
University City	33rd Street	SEPTA Metro: SEPTA City Bus: 30, 31, 49, LUCY	Serves Drexel University
University City	36th–Sansom	SEPTA Metro: SEPTA City Bus: 21	Serves University of Pennsylvania
University City	37th–Spruce	SEPTA Metro: SEPTA City Bus: 40, 42, LUCY	Serves University of Pennsylvania, Children's Hospital of Philadelphia
Spruce Hill	40th Street Portal	SEPTA Metro: SEPTA City Bus: 30, 40, 42, LUCY	End of T2 concurrency
Spruce Hill	Chester–Woodland		Discontinued; end of T4–T5 concurrency
Spruce Hill	41st–Chester (EB)		Discontinued
Spruce Hill	42nd–Chester	SEPTA City Bus: 30	
Spruce Hill	43rd–Chester		
Spruce Hill	45th–Chester		
Spruce Hill	46th–Chester		
Squirrel Hill	47th–Chester		
Squirrel Hill	48th–Chester		
Squirrel Hill	49th–Chester	SEPTA Regional Rail: (at 49th Street); SEPTA City Bus: 64	
Kingsessing	51st–Chester		
Kingsessing	52nd–Chester		
Kingsessing	53rd–Chester		
Kingsessing	54th–Chester	SEPTA City Bus: 52	
Kingsessing	55th–Chester		
Kingsessing	56th–Chester		
Kingsessing	57th–Chester		
Kingsessing	58th–Chester	SEPTA City Bus: 63	
Mount Moriah	59th–Chester		
Mount Moriah	Chester–60th		
Mount Moriah	60th–Kingsessing		
Mount Moriah	61st–Kingsessing		
Mount Moriah	62nd–Kingsessing		
Mount Moriah	Mount Moriah		
Elmwood	65th–Kingsessing		
Elmwood	Chester–65th		
Elmwood	Belmar–65th		
Elmwood	Windsor–65th		
Elmwood	Cobbs Creek–65th		
Yeadon	65th–Chester		
Yeadon	Church–Chester	SEPTA City Bus: 68; SEPTA Suburban Bus: 108	
Yeadon	Yeadon–Chester		
Yeadon	Duncan–Chester		
Yeadon	Stetser–Chester		
Yeadon	Yeadon		
Yeadon	Alfred–Chester		Limited service
Yeadon	Cedar–Chester		Limited service
Darby	Cedar–9th (EB); Mulberry–10th (WB)		Limited service
Darby	Summit–9th (EB); Wycombe–10th (WB)		Limited service
Darby	Summit–10th (WB); Summit–9th (EB)		Limited service
Darby	Ridge–10th (WB); Ridge–9th (EB)		Limited service
Darby	Main–10th (WB)		Limited service
Darby	Darby Transit Center	SEPTA Metro: SEPTA Suburban Bus: 113, 114, 115	Limited service
