= 49th Street station (SEPTA Regional Rail) =

SEPTA Regional Rail station in Philadelphia

49th Street
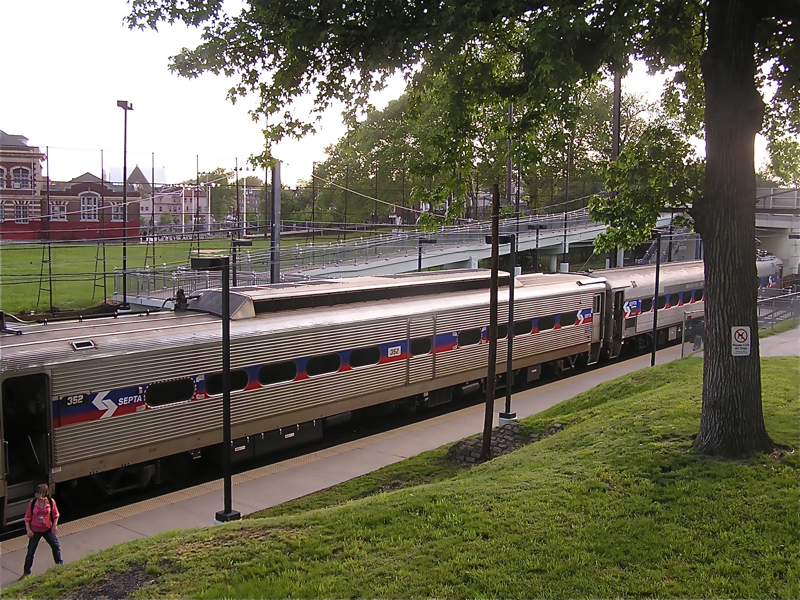
- SEPTA regional rail train at 49th Street station on the Media/Wawa line.

General information
- Location: 49th Street & Chester Avenue; Southwest Philadelphia, Pennsylvania
- Coordinates: 39.94363°N 75.21651°W
- Owner: SEPTA
- Platforms: 2 side platforms
- Tracks: 2
- Connections: SEPTA Metro: at 49th–Chester; SEPTA City Bus: 64

Construction
- Accessible: Yes

Other information
- Fare zone: 1

History
- Electrified: December 2, 1928

Services
Preceding station	SEPTA	Following station
Angora toward Wawa Station	Media/Wawa Line	Penn Medicine Station toward Temple University
Preceding station	SEPTA Metro	Following station
Yeadon Terminus	major stops	40th Street Portal toward 13th Street
Yeadon limited service toward Darby T.C.	major stops	40th Street Portal toward 13th Street
Former services
Preceding station	Pennsylvania Railroad	Following station
Angora toward West Chester	West Chester Line	Philadelphia toward Suburban Station
Location

49th Street station is a SEPTA Regional Rail station in Philadelphia. It is located at 1104 South 49th Street in the Kingsessing section of Southwest Philadelphia, and serves the Media/Wawa Line. In 2013, this station saw 62 boardings and 52 alightings on an average weekday. The station is a sheltered shed that sits on one platform; the other platform has a ramp to the Chester Avenue bridge. The station is handicapped-accessible.

The Media/Wawa line was originally the main line of the West Chester and Philadelphia Railroad, laid in 1852–53. There has been a station at this location since at least 1886, when the line was owned by the Philadelphia, Wilmington and Baltimore Railroad.

== Station layout ==
49th Street has two low-level side platforms.
