= T2 (SEPTA) =

Light rail line in Philadelphia, Pennsylvania

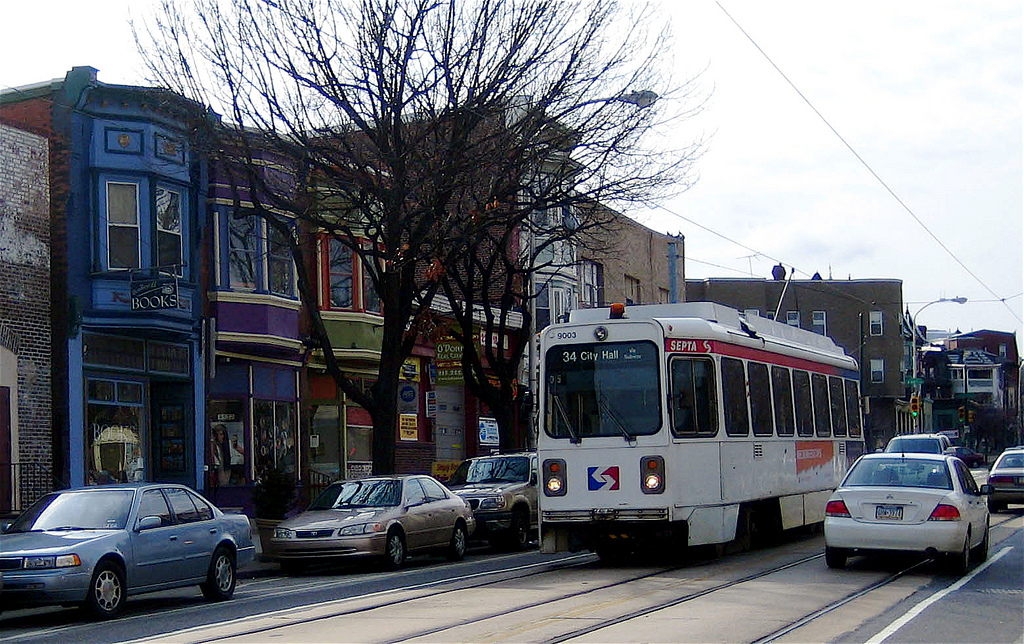
- A trolley in the 4500 block of Baltimore Avenue in 2008

Overview
- Termini: 13th Street; 61st–Baltimore/Angora
- Stations: 8 underground stations, 1 surface level station, and 22 street-level stops

Service
- Type: Trolley
- System: SEPTA Metro
- Depot: Elmwood Carhouse
- Daily ridership: 12,413 (2019)

Technical
- Line length: 10.1 mi (16.3 km)
- Track gauge: 5 ft 2 1/4 in (1,581 mm) Pennsylvania trolley gauge
- Electrification: Overhead line, 600 V DC
Route map
Template:T2 (SEPTA)

The T2, formerly Route 34, is a trolley line operated by the Southeastern Pennsylvania Transportation Authority (SEPTA) that connects the 13th Street station in Center City, Philadelphia, to 61st Street in the Angora neighborhood of West Philadelphia.

At 10.1 miles (16.3 km), it is the shortest of the SEPTA Metro's five T services, which operate on street-level tracks in West Philadelphia and Delaware County, Pennsylvania, and in a shared subway with rapid transit trains in Center City.

== Route description ==
Starting from its eastern end at the 13th Street station, the T2 runs in a tunnel under Market Street. It stops at underground stations at 15th Street/City Hall, 19th Street, 22nd Street, Drexel Station at 30th Street, and 33rd Street. From 15th to 30th Streets, it runs on the outer tracks of the Market Street subway, running beside the L.

Passengers may transfer free of charge to the L at 13th, 15th Street/City Hall, and Drexel Station at 30th Street and to the B at 15th Street. Connections to SEPTA Regional Rail are also available. Underground passageways connect the 13th and 15th Street/City Hall stations to Jefferson Station and Suburban Station.

The T2 surfaces at the 40th Street Portal near 40th Street and Baltimore Avenue (US 13), then heads west on Baltimore until it ends at a loop at 61st Street.

== History ==
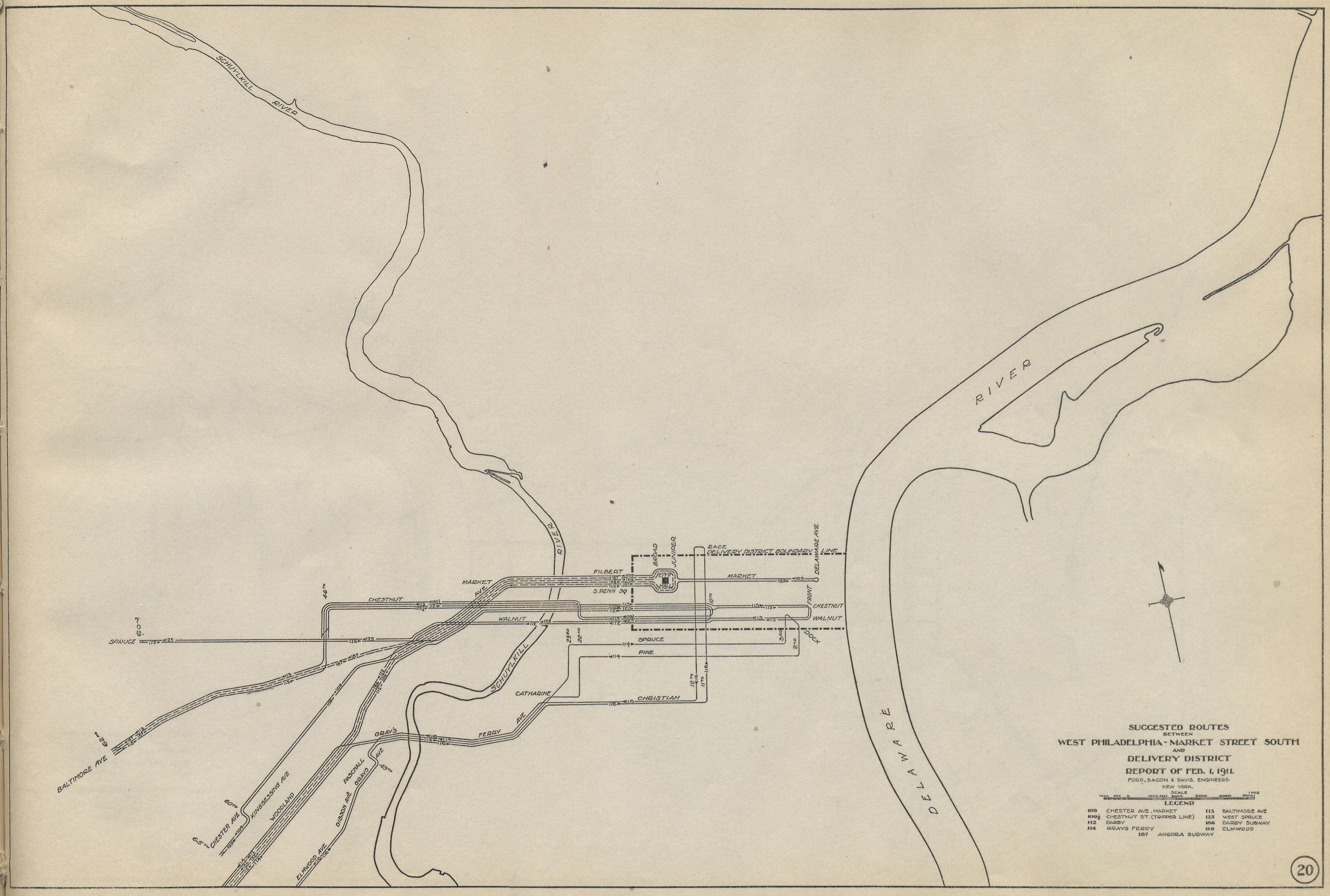
A 1911 map showing the proposed streetcar Routes 113 and 187, whose tracks would decades later be used by SEPTA's Route 34.

The Delaware County and Philadelphia Electric Railway Company installed transit tracks for horsecars running along Baltimore Avenue as early as 1890, but it was the arrival of the electrified trolley two years later that allowed the extension of the line westward to the new community of Angora.

The line was routed into the subway–surface tunnel on December 15, 1906. The route was called the Angora Line until it was given the number 34 in 1911.

In April 2020, the line's operations were suspended due to the COVID-19 pandemic. Service resumed on May 17, 2020.

Route 34 was renamed as the T2 on February 24, 2025.

== Stations and stops ==
All are in the city of Philadelphia.

Neighborhood/ location	Station or stop	Connections	Notes
Market East	13th Street	SEPTA Metro: SEPTA City Bus: 27, 31, 32	Closed between 12:30–5:00am
Penn Center	15th Street/City Hall	SEPTA Regional Rail: all lines (at Suburban); SEPTA Metro: SEPTA City Bus: 4, 16, 17, 27, 31, 32, 33, 38, 44, 48; SEPTA Suburban Bus: 124, 125	Late night terminus
Penn Center	19th Street	SEPTA Metro: SEPTA City Bus: 17, 31, 38, 44, 48; SEPTA Suburban Bus: 124	
Center City; West	22nd Street	SEPTA Metro: SEPTA City Bus: 7, 31, 44; SEPTA Suburban Bus: 124, 125	Replaced 24th Street station
University City	Drexel Station at 30th Street	Amtrak (at 30th Street); NJ Transit: ACL Atlantic City Line (at 30th Street); SEPTA Regional Rail: all lines (at 30th Street); SEPTA Metro: SEPTA City Bus: 31, 49, LUCY	No direct passage to 30th Street Station
University City	33rd Street	SEPTA Metro: SEPTA City Bus: 30, 31, 49, LUCY	Serves Drexel University
University City	36th–Sansom	SEPTA Metro: SEPTA City Bus: 21	Serves University of Pennsylvania
University City	37th–Spruce	SEPTA Metro: SEPTA City Bus: 40, 42, LUCY	Serves University of Pennsylvania, Children's Hospital of Philadelphia
Spruce Hill	40th Street Portal	SEPTA Metro: SEPTA City Bus: 30, 40, 42, LUCY	End of T3, T4, and T5 concurrency
Spruce Hill	41st–Baltimore		
Spruce Hill	42nd–Baltimore	SEPTA City Bus: 30	
Spruce Hill	43rd–Baltimore		Serves Clark Park
Spruce Hill	44th–Baltimore		Serves Clark Park
Spruce Hill	45th–Baltimore		
Spruce Hill	46th–Baltimore		
Cedar Park	47th–Baltimore		
Cedar Park	48th–Baltimore (WB)	SEPTA City Bus: 64	
Cedar Park	Florence–Baltimore (EB)	SEPTA City Bus: 64	
Cedar Park	49th–Baltimore	SEPTA City Bus: 64	
Cedar Park	50th–Baltimore		
Cedar Park	51st–Baltimore		
Cedar Park	52nd–Baltimore (WB)	SEPTA City Bus: 52	
Angora	Broomall–Baltimore (EB)	SEPTA City Bus: 52	
Angora	53rd–Baltimore		
Angora	54th–Baltimore		
Angora	55th–Baltimore		
Angora	56th–Baltimore		
Angora	57th–Baltimore		
Angora	58th–Baltimore	SEPTA Regional Rail: (at Angora); SEPTA City Bus: 46, 63	
Angora	59th–Baltimore		
Angora	60th–Baltimore	SEPTA City Bus: 46	
Angora	61st–Baltimore/Angora		Also called Angora Loop
