= T5 (SEPTA) =

Light rail line in Philadelphia, Pennsylvania

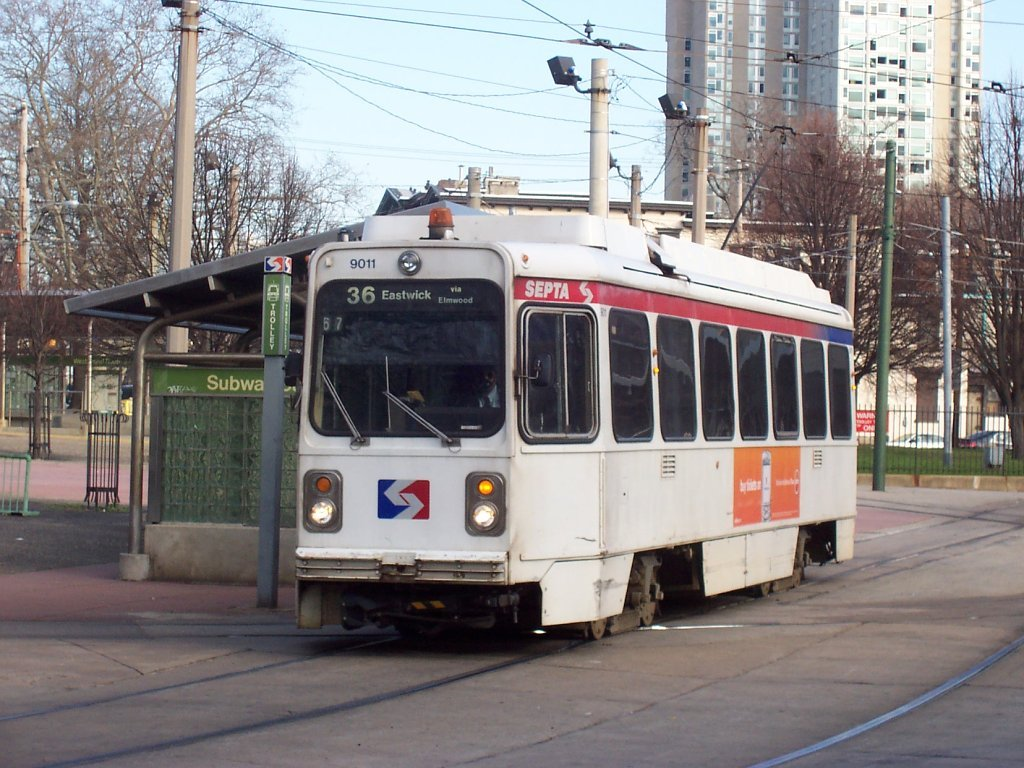
- A trolley at 40th Street Portal in 2006

Overview
- Termini: 13th Street; 80th Street/Eastwick
- Stations: 8 underground stations, 1 surface level station, and 40 street-level stops

Service
- Type: Trolley
- System: SEPTA Metro
- Depot: Elmwood Carhouse
- Daily ridership: 12,737 (2019)

History
- Opened: 1904

Technical
- Line length: 15.3 mi (24.6 km)
- Track gauge: 5 ft 2 1/4 in (1,581 mm) Pennsylvania trolley gauge
- Electrification: Overhead line, 600 V DC
Route map
Template:T5 (SEPTA)

The T5, formerly Route 36, is a trolley line operated by the Southeastern Pennsylvania Transportation Authority (SEPTA) that connects the 13th Street station in Center City, Philadelphia, to the 80th Street/Eastwick station in Eastwick section of Southwest Philadelphia. It is the longest of the five T services, and was even longer between 1956 and 1962 when the western terminus was at 94th Street and Eastwick Avenue. From 1962 through the 1970s, it was at 88th Street and Eastwick Avenue, making the route 16.2 miles (26.1 km) long. Since 1975, it only goes as far as what was once 80th Street at the southern edge of the Penrose Plaza shopping center parking lot.

== Route description ==
Starting from its eastern end at the 13th Street, the T5 runs in a tunnel under Market Street. It stops at underground stations at 15th Street/City Hall, 19th Street, 22nd Street, Drexel Station at 30th Street, and 33rd Street. From 15th to 30th Streets, it runs on the outer tracks of the Market Street subway, beside the L.

Passengers may transfer free of charge to the L at 13th Street, 15th Street/City Hall, and Drexel Station at 30th Street and to the B at 15th Street/City Hall. Connections to SEPTA Regional Rail are also available. Underground passageways connect the 13th Street and 15th Street/City Hall Stations to Jefferson Station and Suburban Station.

The T5 surfaces at the 40th Street Portal near 40th Street and Baltimore Avenue (US 13), runs southwest along Woodland Avenue along with the T4, then turns down 49th Street where the Woodland Carhouse is. After 49th Street crosses over the Wilmington/Newark Line, it takes a sharp right curve as the road becomes Grays Avenue. The T5 runs along Grays Avenue south of the Wilmington/Newark Line until it makes a diagonal move southwest onto Lindbergh Boulevard. Shortly after leaving Grays, the line intersects with 54th Street and crosses over a bridge for the Philadelphia Subdivision freight line, and immediately intersects with a road running along the line leading to Bartram's Botanical Garden, the oldest surviving botanical garden in North America.

Just before Lindbergh Boulevard becomes a divided highway east of 56th Street, the line moves onto Elmwood Avenue. From there it crosses over the Airport Line, continuing westward until it enters a residential area and makes a left turn at a five-way intersection that includes Elmwood Avenue, Island Avenue and Passyunk Avenue on the southeast corner. The northeast corner is the location of the Elmwood Depot on Island Avenue. Tracks runs northward along Island Avenue as far north as Woodland Avenue, which handles pull-ins/pull-outs for the T3 and T4 LRVs.

Island Avenue is a wide boulevard with the T5 tracks down the middle, until the road divides at Buist Avenue, where the tracks run down the median, and a stop exists. Another stop exists at Tanager Street. South of Tanager Street, the southbound Island Avenue lane crosses over the tracks, and they now run between the main road and southbound frontage road. The next stop is South 76th Street, which intersects with the frontage road. The Route T5 line crosses Lindbergh Boulevard again, where it has its own stop in the median on the far sides of Lindbergh Boulevard in each direction. The southwest corner also includes the Penrose Plaza Shopping Center, which spans the west side of Island Avenue as far down as the terminus of the T5. The T5 swings away from the main road of Island Avenue a short time later and the line ends at 80th Street/Eastwick station next to the southwest corner of the shopping center parking lot (separated by a fence), which is accessible from a U-Turn beneath the Island Avenue bridge over the SEPTA Airport Line, and is four blocks east of Eastwick station. As part of its Trolley Modernization Project, SEPTA is considering extending the T5 to an adjacent station.

== History ==
What is now designated as T5 was established as the Elmwood Avenue Line in 1904 by the Philadelphia Rapid Transit Company. Original streetcar service operated between Island Road and Elmwood Avenue via Center City on Market Street to Front & Market Streets. Service rerouted into the Subway-Surface Tunnel and extended to the Westinghouse Plant in Essington on November 5, 1955, replacing Route 37 trolley service. OWL (24-hour) service transferred from Route 37 to Route 36 (T5) at the same time. At the western terminus, service was cut back to 94th Street & Eastwick Avenue on September 9, 1956. Service was cut back again to 88th Street on August 15, 1962, Service was cut back a third time to 84th Street on January 5, 1966, but extended back to 88th Street on December 11, 1972. Service was cut back to 80th Street & Eastwick Avenue on April 26, 1975. In 1985, Island Avenue was converted into a new bridge over the SEPTA Airport Line near the station, and the intersection of 80th Street and Eastwick Avenue was replaced by a frontage road loop on the north side of the tracks. Despite the elimination of the 80th Street intersection, trolleys still sign their destination as 80th Street – Eastwick. Originally, the trolley sign showed the previous name Eastwick. Following the renaming to T5, the trolley LED signs went from 80th & Eastwick back to Eastwick to accommodate the fact 80th Street isn't there anymore.

Route 36 was renamed as the T5 on February 24, 2025.

Under SEPTA's trolley modernization plan, roughly half of the existing T5 stops will be discontinued, and the remaining stops will be upgraded to have ADA compliant station platforms.

== Stations and stops ==
All are in the City of Philadelphia.

| Neighborhood | Station or stop | Connections | Notes |
|---|---|---|---|
| Market East | 13th Street | SEPTA Metro: SEPTA City Bus: 27, 31, 32 | Closed between 12:30–5:00am |
| Penn Center | 15th Street/City Hall | SEPTA Regional Rail: all lines (at Suburban); SEPTA Metro: SEPTA City Bus: 4, 16, 17, 27, 31, 32, 33, 38, 44, 48; SEPTA Suburban Bus: 124, 125 | Late night terminus |
| Penn Center | 19th Street | SEPTA Metro: SEPTA City Bus: 17, 31, 38, 44, 48; SEPTA Suburban Bus: 124 | |
| Center City; West | 22nd Street | SEPTA Metro: SEPTA City Bus: 7, 31, 44; SEPTA Suburban Bus: 124, 125 | Replaced 24th Street station |
| University City | Drexel Station at 30th Street | Amtrak (at 30th Street); NJ Transit: ACL Atlantic City Line (at 30th Street); SEPTA Regional Rail: all lines (at 30th Street); SEPTA Metro: SEPTA City Bus: 31, 49, LUCY | No direct passage to 30th Street Station |
| University City | 33rd Street | SEPTA Metro: SEPTA City Bus: 30, 31, 49, LUCY | Serves Drexel University |
| University City | 36th–Sansom | SEPTA Metro: SEPTA City Bus: 21 | Serves University of Pennsylvania |
| University City | 37th–Spruce | SEPTA Metro: SEPTA City Bus: 40, 42, LUCY | Serves University of Pennsylvania, Children's Hospital of Philadelphia |
| Spruce Hill | 40th Street Portal | SEPTA Metro: SEPTA City Bus: 30, 40, 42, LUCY | End of T2 concurrency |
| Spruce Hill | Chester–Woodland | SEPTA Metro: SEPTA City Bus: 30 | End of T3 concurrency |
| Spruce Hill | 41st–Woodland (EB) | SEPTA Metro: SEPTA City Bus: 30 | |
| Spruce Hill | 42nd–Woodland | SEPTA Metro: | Station platforms planned |
| Spruce Hill | 43rd–Woodland (WB); 45th–Woodland (EB) | SEPTA Metro: | |
| Squirrel Hill | 46th–Woodland | SEPTA Metro: | Station platforms planned |
| Squirrel Hill | 47th–Woodland (EB) | SEPTA Metro: | |
| Kingsessing | 48th–Woodland | SEPTA Metro: | |
| Kingsessing | 49th–Woodland | SEPTA Metro: SEPTA City Bus: 12, 52, 64 | End of T4 concurrency; Station platforms planned |
| Kingsessing | Paschall–49th | SEPTA City Bus: 12, 64 | |
| Kingsessing | 49th–Grays (EB) | | |
| Kingsessing | 51st–Grays | | Station platforms planned |
| Kingsessing | 52nd–Grays (EB); Grays–Lindbergh (WB) | | |
| Kingsessing | Lindbergh–Grays (WB); 53rd–Lindbergh (EB) | | |
| Kingsessing | 54th–Lindbergh | | Station platforms planned |
| Kingsessing | Wheeler–Lindbergh | | |
| Kingsessing | 56th–Elmwood | | Station platforms planned |
| Kingsessing | 57th–Elmwood | | |
| Elmwood | 58th–Elmwood | | Station platforms planned |
| Elmwood | 59th–Elmwood | | |
| Elmwood | Edgewood–Elmwood | | |
| Elmwood | 61st–Elmwood | | Station platforms planned |
| Elmwood | 62nd–Elmwood | SEPTA City Bus: 63 | |
| Elmwood | 63rd–Elmwood | | Station platforms planned |
| Elmwood | 64th–Elmwood | | |
| Elmwood | 65th–Elmwood | SEPTA Suburban Bus: 108 | Station platforms planned |
| Elmwood | 66th–Elmwood | SEPTA Suburban Bus: 108 | |
| Elmwood | 67th–Elmwood | | Station platforms planned |
| Elmwood | 68th–Elmwood | | |
| Elmwood | 69th–Elmwood | | |
| Elmwood | 70th–Elmwood | | Station platforms planned |
| Elmwood | 71st–Elmwood | | |
| Elmwood | 72nd–Elmwood | | |
| Elmwood | 73rd–Elmwood | | Located near Elmwood Depot & overnight terminus; Station platforms planned |
| Eastwick | Island–Elmwood | SEPTA City Bus: 68; SEPTA Suburban Bus: 108 | |
| Eastwick | Buist–Island | SEPTA City Bus: 68 | |
| Eastwick | Tanager–Island | | Station platforms planned |
| Eastwick | 76th–Island | | |
| Eastwick | Lindbergh–Island | SEPTA City Bus: 37, 68 | |
| Eastwick | Island–Suffolk | | |
| Eastwick | 80th Street/Eastwick | SEPTA Regional Rail: (at Eastwick) | Proposed: 80th–Island station |
