= 40th Street Portal =

SEPTA Subway-Surface Lines trolley station

40th St Portal
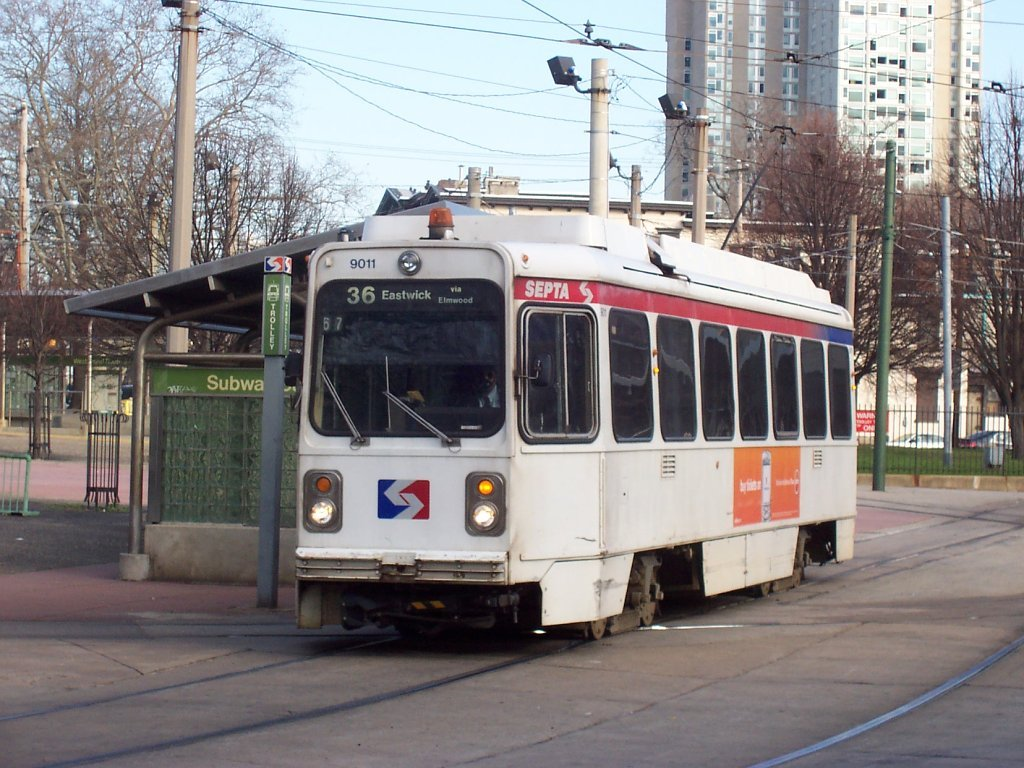
- Outbound trolley at the station

General information
- Location: 40th Street, Woodland Avenue and Baltimore Avenue; Philadelphia, Pennsylvania
- Coordinates: 39.9495°N 75.2033°W
- Owner: SEPTA
- Platforms: 3 side platforms
- Tracks: 3
- Connections: SEPTA City Bus: 30, 49

Construction
- Structure type: At grade
- Accessible: No

History
- Opened: 1955

Services
Preceding station	SEPTA Metro	Following station
58th–Baltimore major stops toward 61st–Baltimore/Angora	T2 (SEPTA Metro)	37th–Spruce toward 13th Street
49th–Chester major stops toward Yeadon or Darby T.C.	T3 (SEPTA Metro)	37th–Spruce toward 13th Street
Darby T.C. major stops Terminus	T4 (SEPTA Metro)	37th–Spruce toward 13th Street
80th Street/Eastwick major stops Terminus	T5 (SEPTA Metro)	37th–Spruce toward 13th Street
Location

40th Street Portal is a SEPTA Metro T station in Philadelphia. At this station's portal, four trolley routes enter the Woodland Avenue subway portal after running on the street in Southwest Philadelphia and nearby suburbs. Eastbound trolleys run in the tunnel under the nearby campuses of the University of Pennsylvania and Drexel University to Center City Philadelphia. Westbound trolleys travel to the Philadelphia neighborhoods of Eastwick and Angora and the Delaware County suburbs of Yeadon and Darby.

The station is located above ground at the entrance to the tunnel in a plaza between Woodland Avenue and Baltimore Avenue at 40th Street, adjacent to The Woodlands. When the tunnel is closed, trolleys are re-routed along 42nd Street to terminate at the 40th Street station of the L and do not serve this station. To get to the trolleys, passengers can catch SEPTA's Route 30 just outside of the station on Woodland Avenue to catch the trolleys along 42nd Street where the trolley diversion route begins, or at 40th and Market Streets. Alternately, when Route 30 buses are not serving this station (as some trips terminate at 40th and Market Street), passengers can also walk north on 40th Street 2 blocks to Spruce Street and catch trolleys for either direction there (outbound trolleys stop on 40th Street at Spruce Street before turning west onto Spruce Street and then south on 42nd Street before rejoining their respective normal routings; eastbound trolleys board on Spruce Street at 40th Street in front of the Copabanana restaurant before continuing east on Spruce Street, north on 38th Street, and west on Filbert Street to 40th Street where connections to the L trains can be made). On August 23rd 2026, due to the New Bus Network, Route 49 was rerouted to terminate here. This allows passengers to catch trolleys here when they are in operation at the portal. When Route 30 is discontinued in 2027, Route 49 will still be at 40th Street Portal near Baltimore Avenue.

== History ==
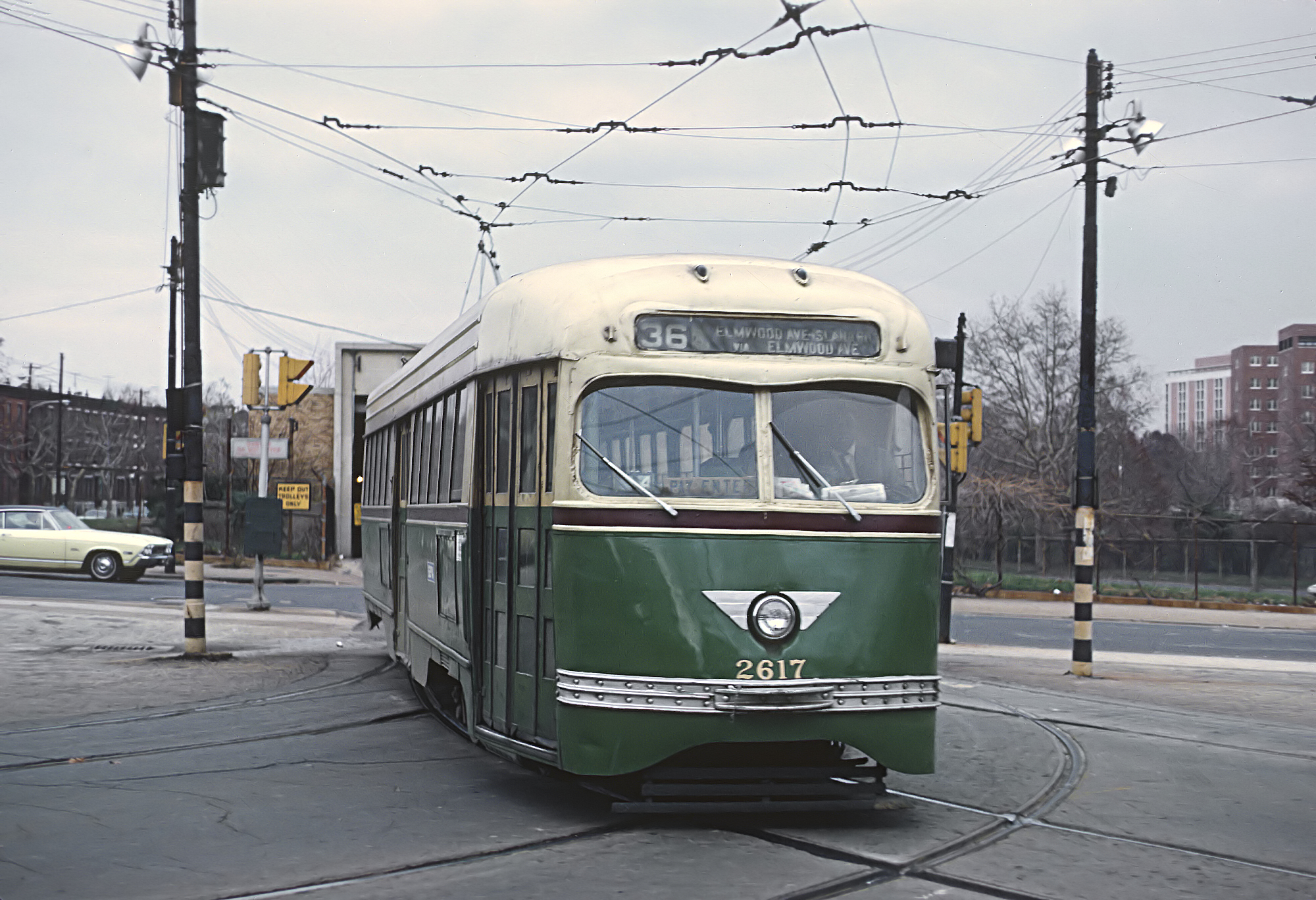
A Route 36 PCC streetcar at the station in 1968

The portal station was opened October 15, 1955 eastbound and westbound opened November 6, 1955 by the Philadelphia Transportation Company (PTC) as part of a larger project to move portions of the elevated Market Street Line and surface trolleys underground.

The original project to bury the elevated tracks between 23rd to 46th streets was announced by the PTC's predecessor, the Philadelphia Rapid Transit Company (PRT), in the 1920s, but was delayed due to the Great Depression and World War II. The PTC's revised project also included a new tunnel for trolleys underneath the campus of the University of Pennsylvania, continuing from the original western portal at 23rd and Market streets to two new portals, the other being at 36th and Ludlow streets for Route 10.

When constructed, the 40th Street Portal layout formed a “T” shape (seen in the picture above) with 40th Street crossing directly in front of the mouth of the portal. This configuration lacked the ability to turn trolleys around for emergencies and schedule adjustments and is dangerous for motorists, as they would often mistake the traffic light at the trolley portal mouth as Woodland Avenue and would sometimes turn into the subway tunnel causing delays, or suspend service. So in 1983, to solve this problem, the configuration was revised and a turnaround loop was constructed and 40th Street was removed from crossing directly in front. This is what made the portal, though, some cars, go through the portal and to the tunnel.

However, service to the vicinity of 40th Street, Woodland Avenue, and Baltimore Avenue has existed long before then. Routes 11, 13, and 36 operated from their current outer termini of Darby and Eastwick to Front Street in Center City beginning December 15, 1906.

=== Trolley Portal Gardens ===
In 2012, the University City District began a plan to overhaul the 40th street portal. The plan included replacing asphalt with green space and landscaping, benches, bike racks, new lighting, and a cafe fronting Baltimore Avenue. The University City District raised $2.1 million for the project. Groundbreaking was in December 2016, but construction did not start until June 2017. The 40th Street Trolley Portal Gardens officially opened to the public on September 27, 2018. In August 2021, the garden was cleared by University City District due to overgrowth obstructing visibility for trolley operators and attracting pests. The organization began replanting the garden in September 2021 with a new layout.

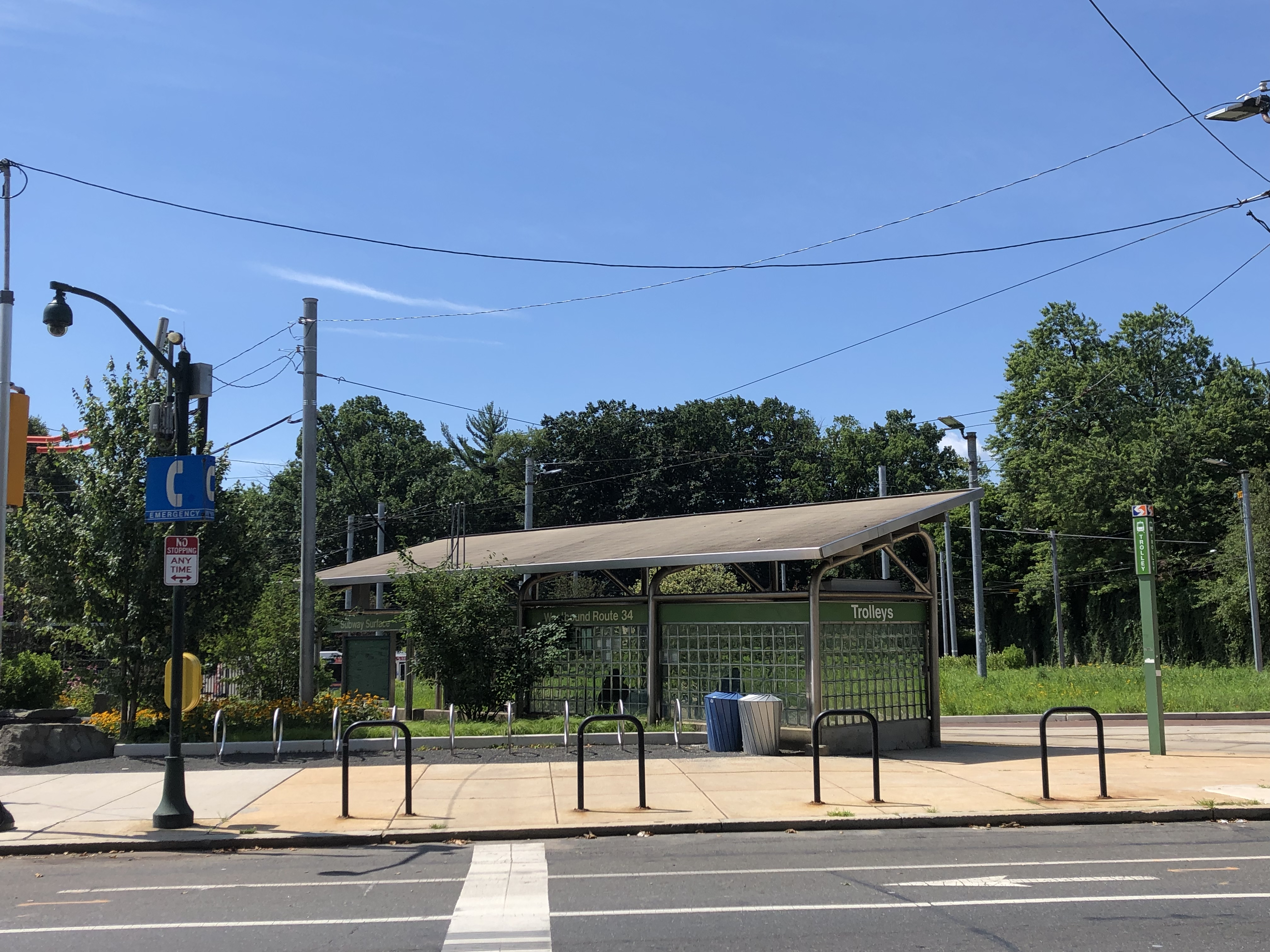
New landscaping at the station in 2019

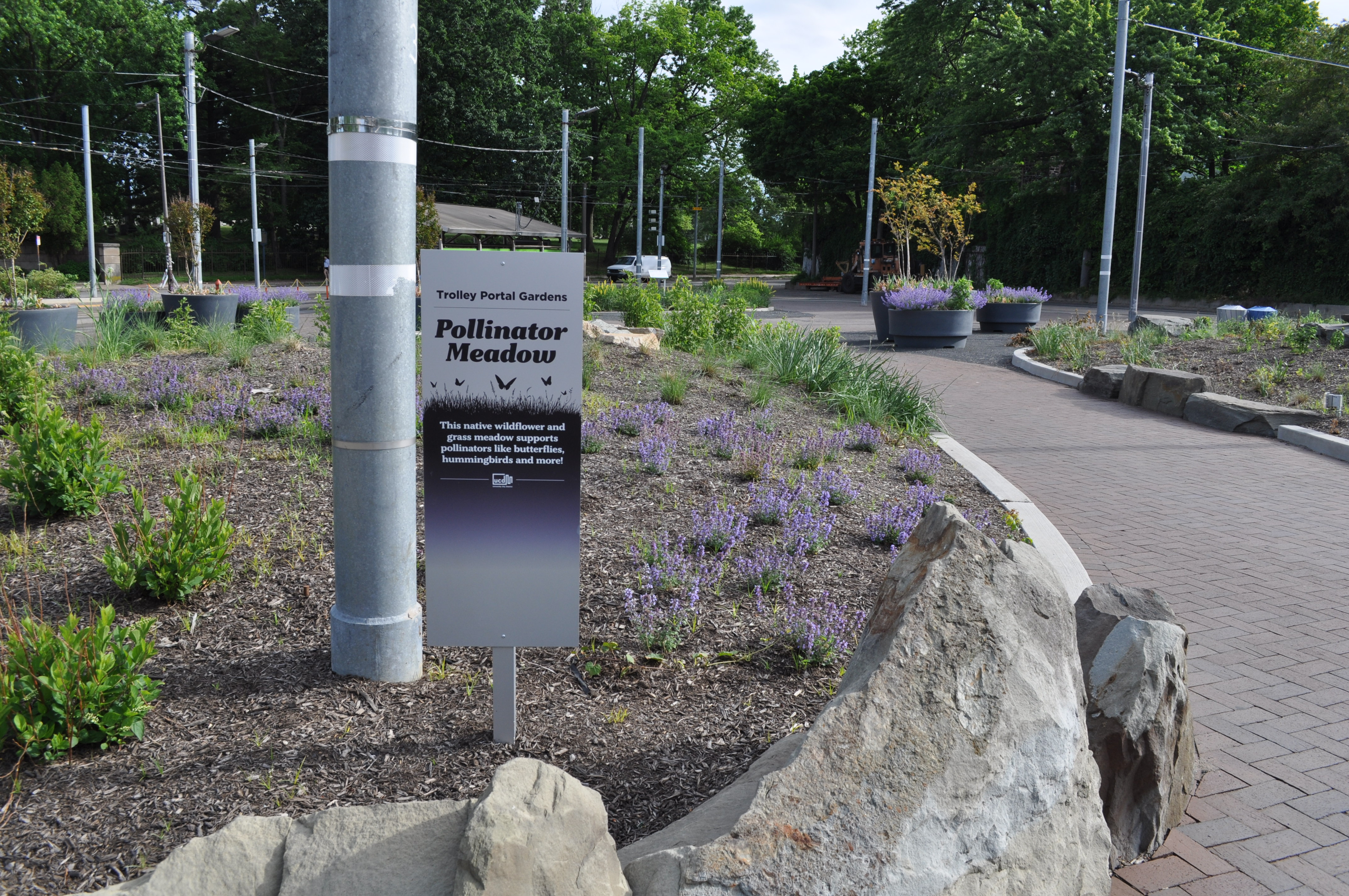
Walkway and pollinator garden in 2022
