= 36th Street Portal =

Subway station in Philadelphia, Pennsylvania

36th St Portal
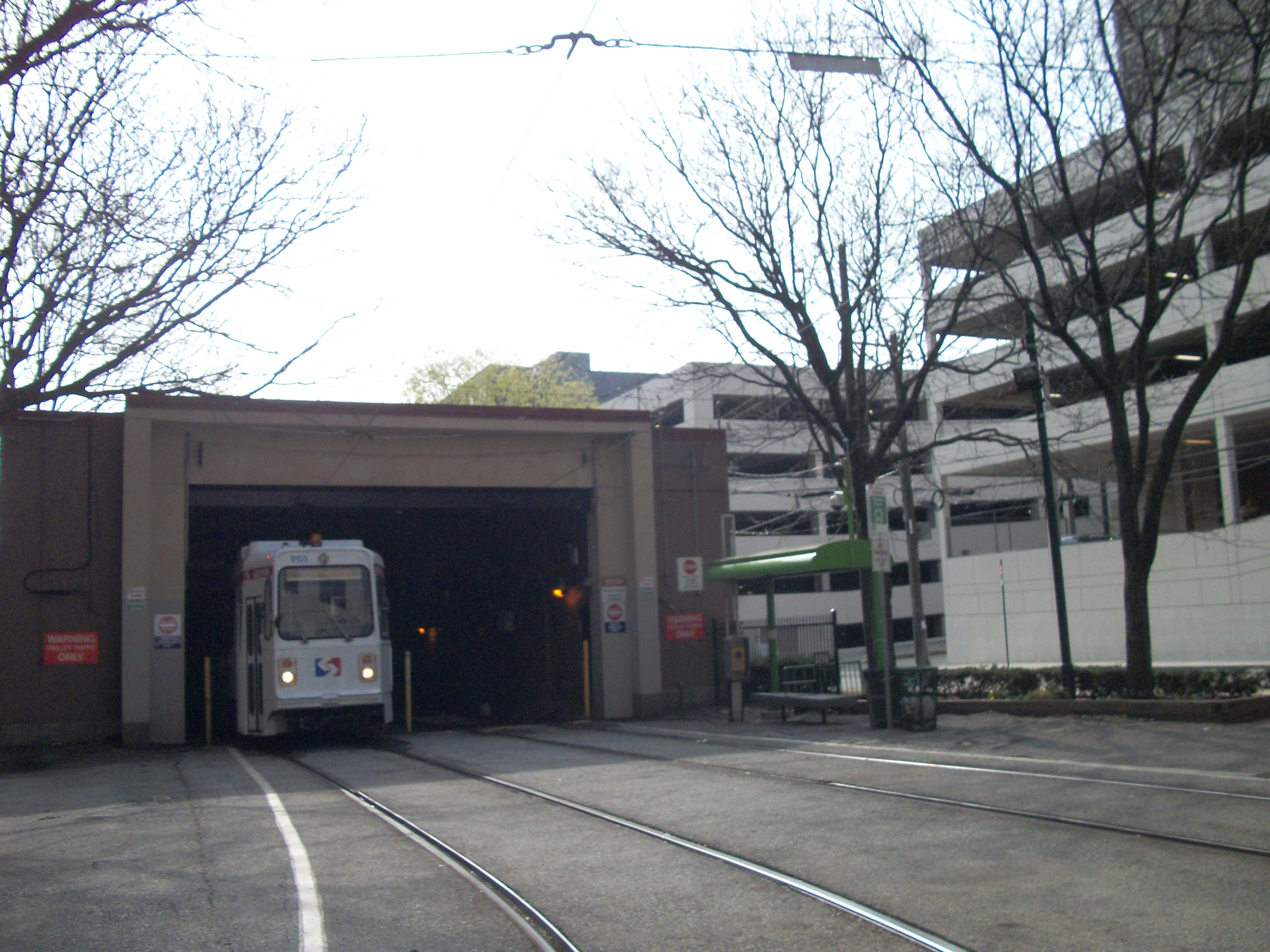
- Outbound trolley

General information
- Location: 36th and Ludlow Streets; Philadelphia, Pennsylvania
- Coordinates: 39°57′22″N 75°11′38″W
- Owner: SEPTA
- Platforms: 2 side platforms
- Tracks: 2

Construction
- Structure type: At-grade
- Accessible: No

History
- Opened: October 17, 1955

Services
| Preceding station | SEPTA Metro | Following station |
|---|---|---|
| 63rd–Malvern/Overbrook major stops Terminus | T1 (SEPTA Metro) | 33rd Street toward 13th Street |
Location

36th Street Portal is a SEPTA Metro T station in Philadelphia serving the T1 trolley. The station is located at the corner of 36th and Ludlow streets, one block from Market Street. The station is located at a tunnel portal that connects with trackage for the other subway–surface lines.

The station is two blocks north of 36th–Sansom station, an underground station serving the remaining subway–surface routes.

== History ==
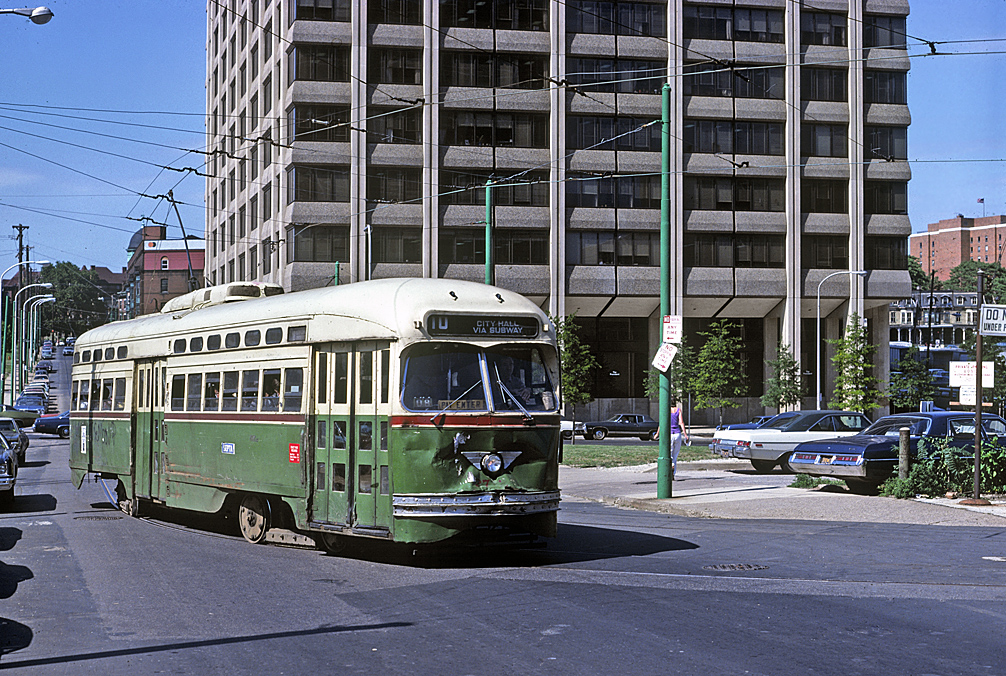
A PCC streetcar turning off 36th Street towards the portal in 1976.

The portal station was opened on October 17, 1955 by the Philadelphia Transportation Company (PTC) as part of a larger project to move portions of the elevated Market Street Line and surface trolleys underground. The original project to bury the elevated tracks between 23rd to 46th streets was announced by the PTC's predecessor, the Philadelphia Rapid Transit Company (PRT), in the 1920s, but was delayed due to the Great Depression and World War II. The PTC's revised project also included a new tunnel for subway–surface trolleys underneath the campus of the University of Pennsylvania, continuing from the original western portal at 23rd and Market streets to the 36th Street Portal, as well as to 40th Street and Baltimore Avenue for other trolley routes besides the 10.

However, service to the vicinity of 36th and Market streets has existed long before then, as the Route 10 was established in its original form by the PRT in 1906.

== Station layout ==
West of the station, the T1 runs on surface streets through West Philadelphia to the Overbrook section of the city. East of the station, trolleys enter the tunnel and continue to Center City Philadelphia.
