= Eastwick, Philadelphia =

Neighborhood of Philadelphia, Pennsylvania, United States

Eastwick
- Neighborhood of Philadelphia
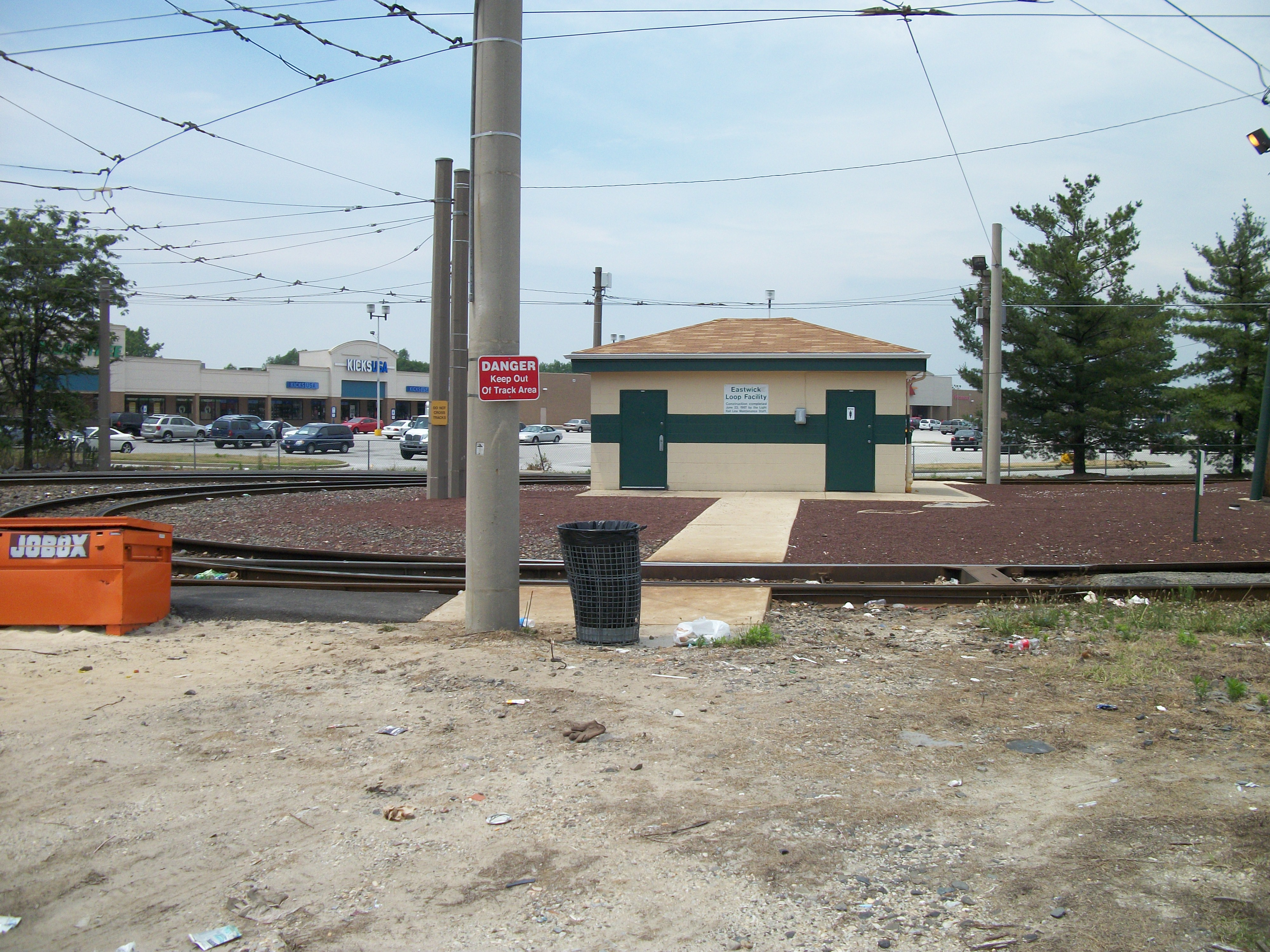
- The SEPTA employee bathroom at the center of the Eastwick Loop station

- Location within Philadelphia
- Country: United States
- State: Pennsylvania
- County: Philadelphia
- City: Philadelphia
- Area codes: 215, 267, and 445

Eastwick is a neighborhood in the Southwest section of Philadelphia, Pennsylvania, United States. It is the southwesternmost neighborhood in the city, bordering Philadelphia International Airport and the city line with Delaware County at Cobbs Creek and Darby Creek. The Elmwood Park neighborhood borders it to the northeast. It includes the Clearview neighborhood.

== History ==
The neighborhood is named for Andrew M. Eastwick, an engineer and patron of Bartram's Garden. It was largely rural until the 1920s when swampy land was dredged to create room for an airport and other large-scale uses within the city limits. Much of the original housing built before the 1950s lacked sewer service and other urban conveniences. Residents referred to the neighborhood as "The Meadows."

Residents enjoyed the ability to have a rural lifestyle within city limits; nearby creeks provided recreation in the form of swimming, bathing, and fishing. An extensive crabbing home industry was based in The Meadows.

Homes ranged from traditional single-family residences with lawns and gardens to traditional Philadelphia-style row houses; sometimes, these two housing styles appeared on the same block. Brick was the predominant material used in construction. Homes were built from the early 19th century until the Second World War caused a shortage of material for new construction.

The city of Philadelphia, which had been under Republican control in the 1940s, shifted in the 1950s toward reform Democrats, whose policies included community redevelopment. At the same time, city planners began to eye Eastwick as a place to relocate low-income black populations being displaced by development projects in North and West Philadelphia. Yet although planners described Eastwick as "open land," it actually constituted an integrated community of some 19,000, the majority of whom owned their homes. Unsurprisingly, the plan faced opposition.

But it nevertheless went forward. In 1958, Eastwick was declared the largest urban renewal project in the country, with the Korman Company making plans to replace the allegedly "poorly maintained and blighted homes" with newer, suburban-style construction in the 1960s and 70s. As Guian A. McKee writes in his study of Eastwick, the new development came at the expense of the existing community. It thus produced a "tragic irony," seeing as its realization required "the destruction of the area's unique existing community," which was one of the few integrated neighborhoods in Philadelphia at the time.

Designing the project was the Greek urban planner Constantinos Apostolou Doxiadis, mastermind of Islamabad, Riyadh, and Baghdad's Revolution City. In these cities, he had made a name for himself by integrating city and countryside in a way that he, and state officials, hoped would ease the transition of rural migrants to urban space. Put differently, Doxiadis's designs were seen as anti-communist. In Eastwick, Doxiadis's work took the form of row houses on cul-de-sac streets, with traffic funneled toward peripheral roads. The neighborhood was one of only three in Philadelphia that grew in population between 1970 and 1990.

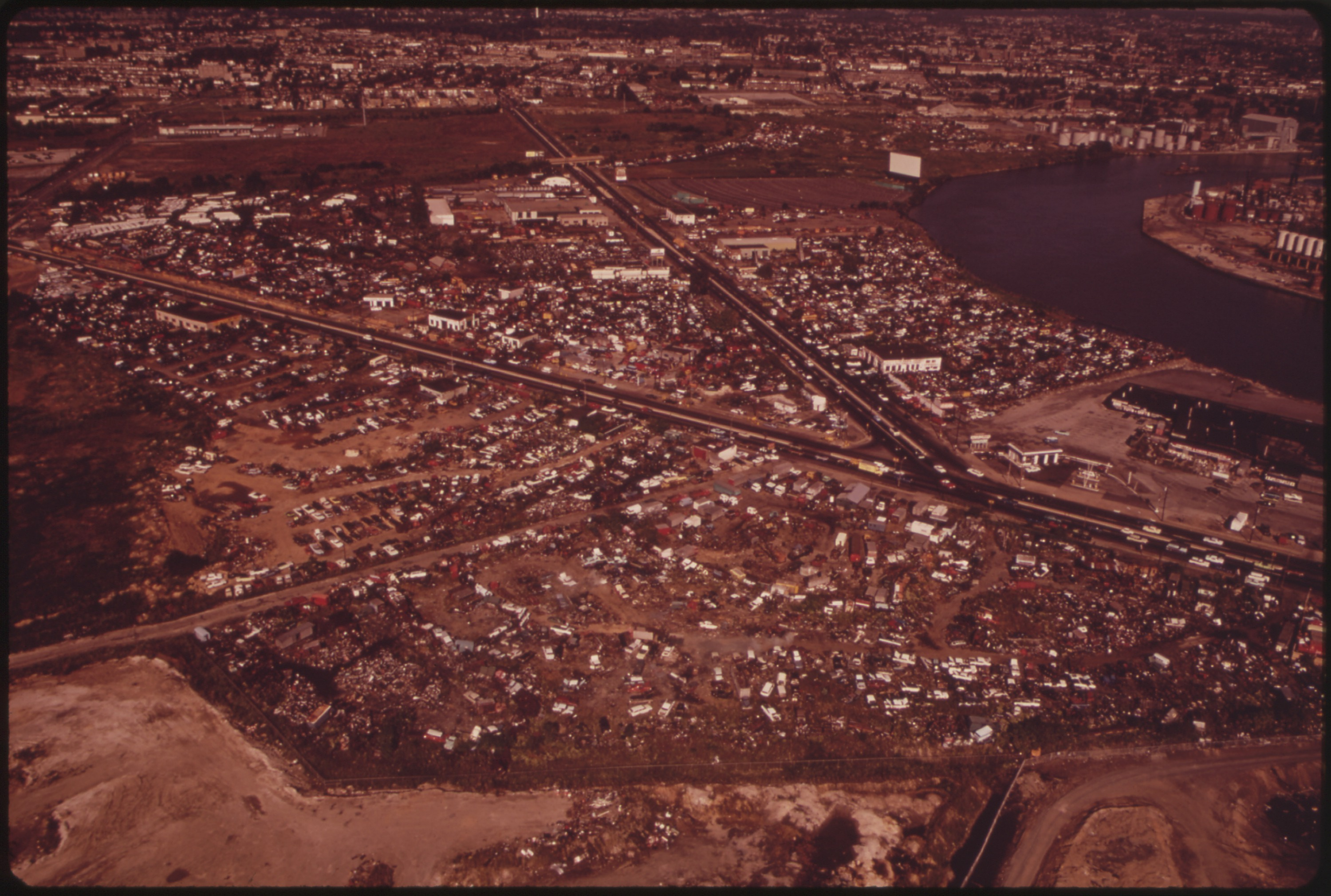
Auto junkyards in Eastwick during the 1970s

The John Heinz National Wildlife Refuge at Tinicum extends from Eastwick to Tinicum Township, Pennsylvania. Eastwick contains a large industrial area where manufacturing and distributing uses take advantage of proximity to the Airport, Interstate 95, and Center City Philadelphia. There are many gas tank farms, oil refineries, and a sewage treatment plant. The area offers affordable land for industrial uses at reportedly "one-third the cost of outlying suburbs," while enabling companies to remain in the city where employees can utilize public transit.

The neighborhood has been the site of controversy for a number of issues. Some blocks are located in a flood plain, leading to flooded, abandoned homes and vacant lots that are often used for illegal dumping. Issues of environmental regulation and brownfields cleanup have also figured into the history of Eastwick. The Philadelphia metropolitan area's main post office, formerly housed next to 30th Street Station, moved to a larger, auto-oriented facility in Eastwick in 2006. This move was long criticized by neighborhood groups.

=== 1946 Eastwick General Electric plant strike ===
From January 15 until March 18, 1946, a surging crowd of more than 3,000 electrical strikers protested around Eastwick and the area's former General Electric plant in connection with a court injunction prohibiting mass picketing at the plant by Judge Thomas D. Finletter, which led with a total of 25,000 demonstrators. The protests later turned into a "siege of violence" three days after the protests started. There were reports of 20 injuries, 17 protestors detained by officers, and reports of protestors giving hateful speeches, including the Nazi salute, forcing nearly 300 officers to break up the violence.

The strike came to a conclusion on March 18, 1946, when employees returned back to the plant.

== Demographics ==
As of the census of 2000, there were 14,424 people living in the neighborhood. The racial makeup was 36.70% White, 57.47% African American, 2.68% Asian, and 0.69% from other races. Hispanic or Latino of any race were 1.91% of the population. The median income for a household in the neighborhood was $33,320.

== Transportation ==
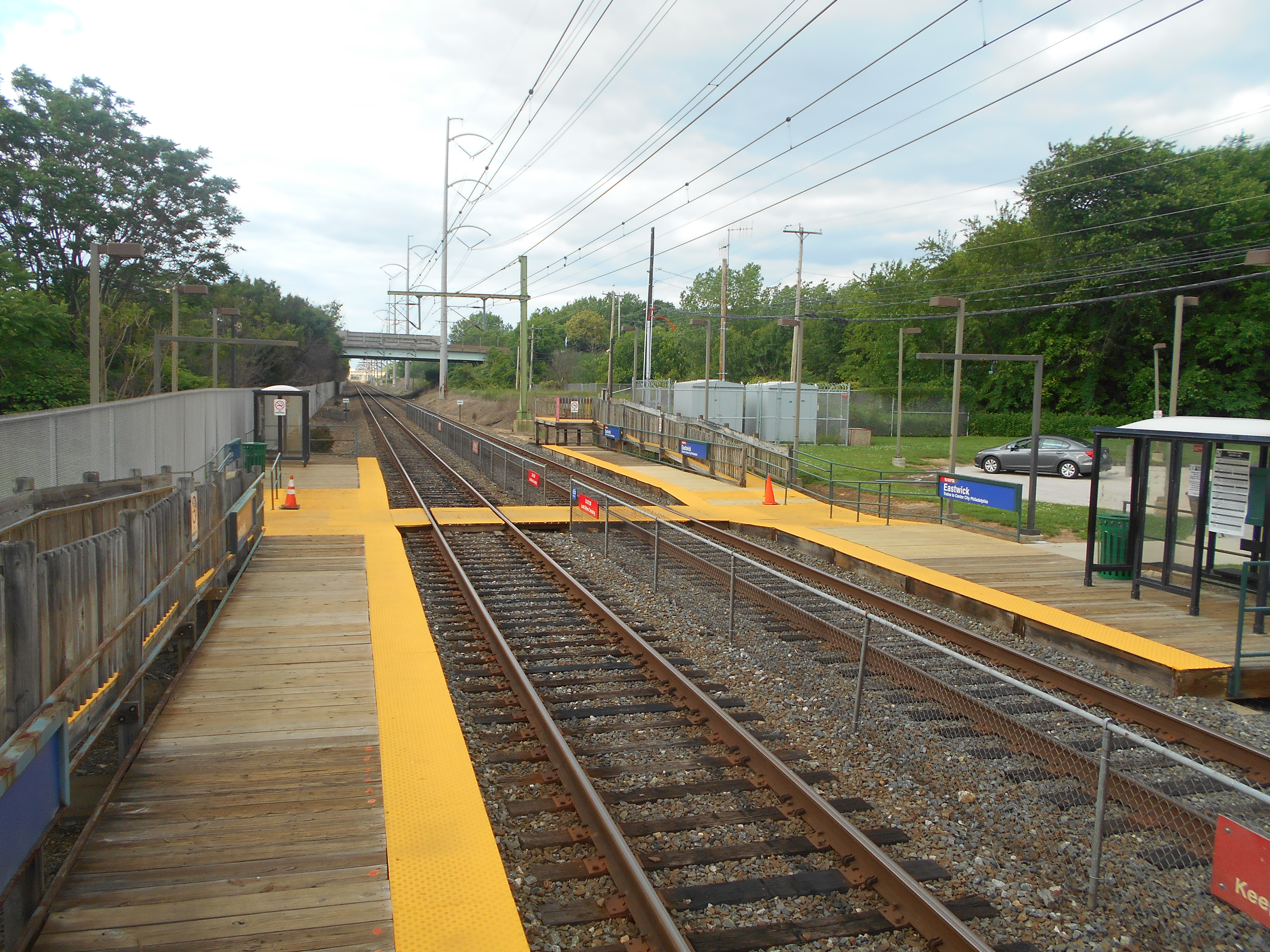
Eastwick station along SEPTA Regional Rail's Airport Line

Eastwick is served by SEPTA Subway-Surface Route T5 (formerly Route 36), which runs through the neighborhood and terminates at 80th Street–Eastwick station. This station is within walking distance of the Eastwick station on SEPTA Regional Rail's Airport Line; it is the only station on the line between the airport stations and Penn Medicine Station.

== Education ==
Free Library of Philadelphia operates the Eastwick Branch, which serves Eastwick and other subdivisions, at 2851 Island Avenue.
