= L (SEPTA) =

Rapid transit line in Philadelphia, Pennsylvania

Market–Frankford Line

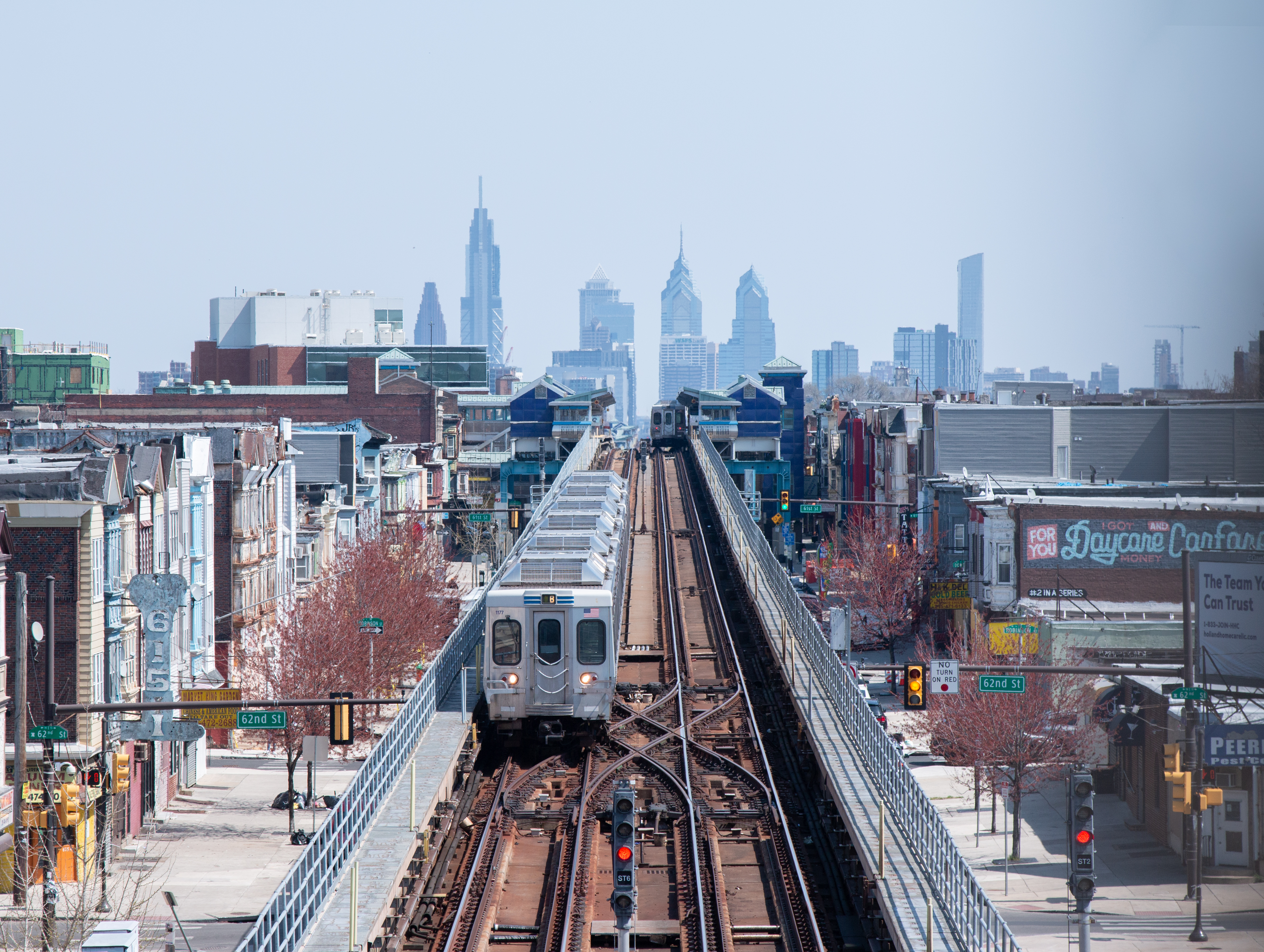
- L train arriving at 63rd Street station in 2021

Overview
- Status: Operating
- Owner: City of Philadelphia (Frankford to 15th St); SEPTA (15th St to 69th St)
- Locale: Upper Darby, Millbourne and Philadelphia, Pennsylvania, U.S.
- Termini: Frankford Transit Center; 69th Street Transit Center
- Stations: 28 (1 temporarily closed)
- Website: septa.org/schedules/L1

Service
- Type: Rapid transit
- System: SEPTA Metro
- Services: All Stops
- Operator(s): 1907–39: Philadelphia Rapid Transit Company; 1940–68: Philadelphia Transportation Company; 1968–present: SEPTA
- Daily ridership: 125,192 (FY 2025)

History
- Opened: March 4, 1907; 119 years ago
- Last extension: 1922

Technical
- Line length: 12.9 miles (20.76 km)
- Num of tracks: 2
- Character: Elevated and underground
- Track gauge: 5 ft 2 1/4 in (1,581 mm) Pennsylvania trolley gauge
- Electrification: Third rail, 700 V DC (formerly 600 V DC)
- Operating speed: 19 mph (31 km/h) (avg.); 55 mph (89 km/h) (top)

The L, (Note: Conventions for line names state they are to be referred to by letter only (i.e. "the L", not "the L line")) also known as the Market–Frankford Line, previously abbreviated as the MFL, (Note: Also known as the Blue Line or the El (/ɛl/; short for elevated train)) is a rapid transit line in the SEPTA Metro network in Philadelphia, Pennsylvania, United States. The L runs from the 69th Street Transit Center in Upper Darby, just outside of West Philadelphia, through Center City Philadelphia to the Frankford Transit Center in Near Northeast Philadelphia.

The L is the busiest route in the SEPTA system; it had more than 125,000 passengers on an average weekday in fiscal year 2025. The line has elevated, on-grade, and underground subway portions.

== Route ==
The L begins at 69th Street Transit Center in Upper Darby. The L then heads east at ground level and passes north of the borough of Millbourne. From there, it enters West Philadelphia and is elevated over Market Street until 46th Street, where it curves north and east and then descends underground via a portal at 44th Street. At 42nd Street, the tunnel returns to the alignment of Market Street.

At 32nd Street, the tunnel carrying the T routes join the L tunnel. The L tracks are in the center and the trolley tracks are on the outside. Drexel consists of an island platform between the two innermost tracks for L trains, and outboard "wall" platforms for T trolleys. After passing beneath the Schuylkill River, L trains run express to 15th Street/City Hall, skipping the intermediate trolley stations at 22nd Street and 19th Street. 15th Street/City Hall is the central interchange station for the L, T, and B. The T tracks end in a loop beneath Juniper Street at Market just after crossing above the B.

Though it now tunnels in a straight line directly beneath Philadelphia City Hall, prior to 1936, the original MFL trackage between 15th and 13th Street stations separated and looped around the foundation of City Hall (eastbound trains passed around the south side and westbound trains passed around the north side). Parts of that original alignment are now used by T cars as they pass south of City Hall en route to 13th Street station (as well as the bridgework in the ceiling of the southbound platform of the City Hall stop on the Broad Street line). The Market Street tunnel continues east to Front Street and then turns north, where it rises in the median of I-95. The rail line and freeway share an elevated embankment for about 1/2 mile (0.8 km), including Spring Garden station, which replaced Fairmount station on the Frankford Elevated in 1977. The line then heads under the southbound lanes and over Front Street for about a mile on an elevated structure. The elevated structure then turns northeast onto Kensington Avenue, which after about 2 miles (3.2 km), merges with Frankford Avenue (which the line follows to its end). Just north of Pratt Street, a curve to the north brings the line to its terminus at the Frankford Transit Center, which replaced the original Bridge & Pratt Street terminal.

== History ==
=== 20th century ===
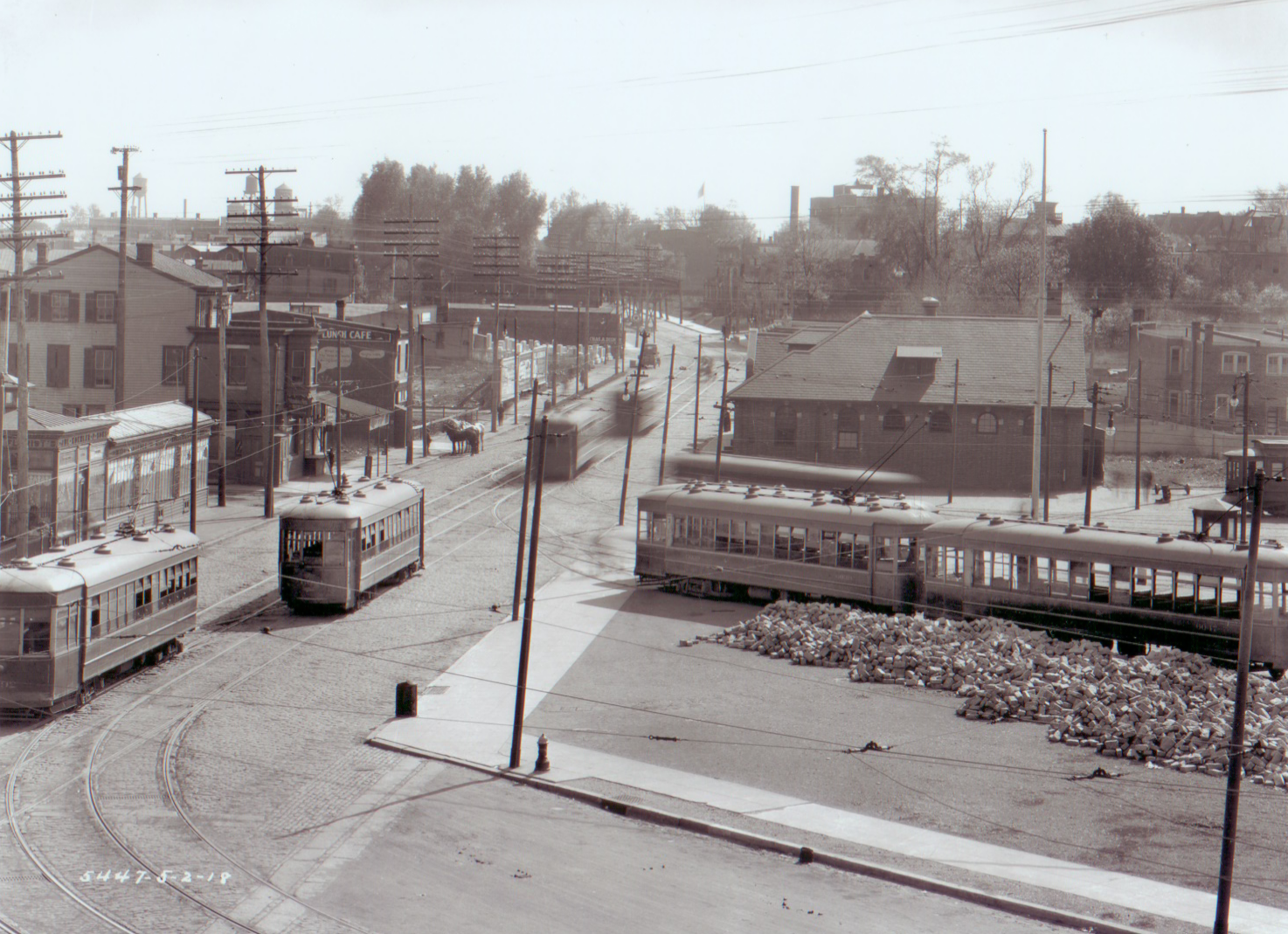
Frankford Terminal in 1918 prior to the construction of Frankford Elevated

The original subway tunnel from Philadelphia City Hall to the portal at 23rd Street, as well as the bridge to carry the line across the Schuylkill River, just north of Market Street, were built from April 1903 to August 1905. Construction on the Market Street Elevated west from this point began In April 1904, and the line opened on March 4, 1907, from 69th Street Terminal to a loop around Philadelphia City Hall at 15th Street. The line was elevated west of the river and underground east of the river. The tunnel was also used by streetcar lines, now SEPTA's T lines, that entered the line just east of the river and turned around at the City Hall loop. Philadelphia was unusual in that the construction of its initial downtown subway was undertaken using Philadelphia Rapid Transit Co. (PRT) private capital with no contribution from public funds.

Extensions took the subway east to 2nd Street on August 3, 1908, and via a portal at Front and Market Streets and several elevated curves near Front and Arch Streets, it reached the Delaware River between Market Street and Chestnut Street on September 7, 1908. The Delaware Avenue Elevated (also called the Ferry Line, because of the multiple ferries across the river) opened on October 4, 1908, as a further extension south along the river to South Street. The only two stations on this extension were Market–Chestnut and South Street.

The total cost, including road and equipment expenditures, of the Market Street subway and elevated was $23,072,114 (equivalent to about $826,750,800 in 2025).

The first operating section of the Frankford Elevated was planned to extend from Arch Street, connecting with PTC Market Street line to Bridge Street, 6.4 miles (10.3 km). Construction, financed by the City of Philadelphia and managed by the Department of City Transit, was started in September 1915. At that time, construction was anticipated to require about three years. However, construction was slowed because of World War I.

By February 1920, 65 percent of the construction work had been completed and 15 percent was under contract. Of the remainder, plans had been completed for ten percent, leaving approximately ten percent of construction "yet to be arranged for". The superstructure had been completed between Dyre Street (south of Pratt Street) to a point just north of Arch Street. However, only two stations had been completed, and six had not been started. Signals, substations and cars had "yet to be arranged for". In 1919, the Public Service Commission of Pennsylvania approved a connection between the Frankford and Market Street lines in 1919, with signals and signal tower to be built by PRT. However, the Philadelphia City Solicitor determined that the connection could not be built until a contract for operation had been signed and approved by the PSC. This did not take place until 1922. The line was dedicated on November 4, 1922, and opened for service on November 5. Trains from 69th Street alternated between the Frankford and Ferry Line terminals.

Total expenditures by the city for the Frankford El "with its track, substations, equipment and certain rolling stock" was $15,604,000 to December 31, 1929.

The planned and authorized second section of the Frankford El, Bridge Street to Rhawn Street with intermediate stations at Comly Street, Levick Street, Tyson Avenue, and Cottman Avenue, 3.0 miles (4.8 km) was not built.

Following the opening of the Delaware River Bridge (now the Benjamin Franklin Bridge) in 1926, traffic on the Delaware Ave branch declined sharply. Evening, Sunday and holiday service was discontinued on January 24, 1937. Sunday and holiday service was restored from May 30 to September 13, 1937, and again from July 3 to September 12, 1938. The last day of service was May 6, 1939, with the last train departing South Street at 7:00 p.m. Thereafter, the line was closed and dismantled. A replacement bus service was started in 1943 to serve wartime traffic, and continued in operation until 1953. The old interlocking tower and stub of the junction with the Ferry Line survived until the realignment into the median of I-95 in 1977.

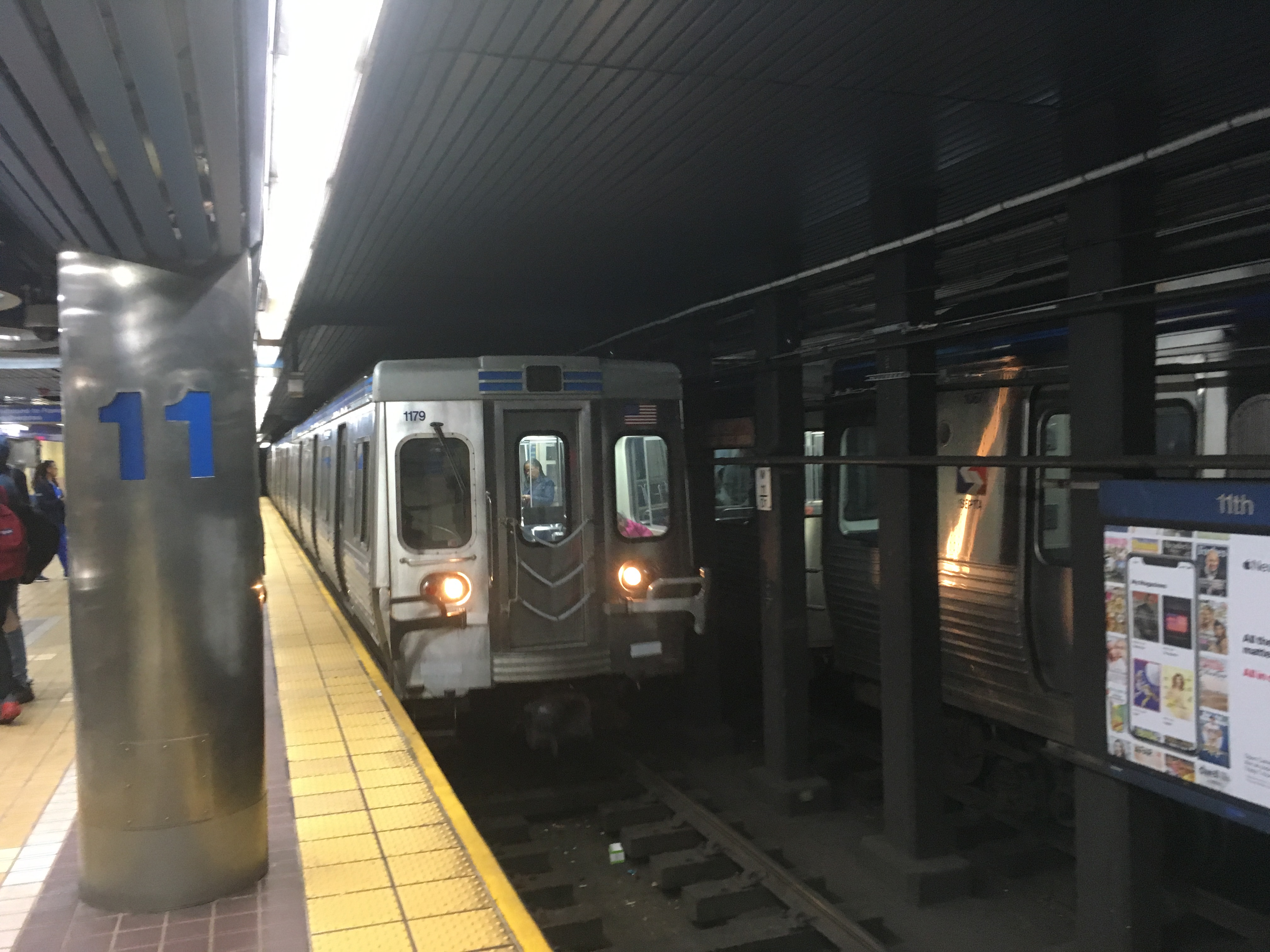
L train at 11th Street station in 2019

As part of a program of railroad improvements undertaken by the City of Philadelphia and the Pennsylvania Railroad, a new section of tunnel from 22nd Street to 46th Street was started in 1930, which would allow for removal of the elevated structure east of 46th Street and the old Schuylkill River Bridge. Coinciding with this project, a new bridge was also to be built across the river for automobile traffic; this raised the level of the street to permit the roadway to pass over the underground tracks of the Pennsylvania Railroad near their new 30th Street Station. This resulted in a reduction of vertical clearance under the old elevated structure from 20 feet (6.1 m) to only 8 feet (2.4 m), which was expected to be only a temporary problem until the new subway tunnel was complete. Funding ran out before the subway extension could be finished. Although streetcar tracks were installed in the new Market Street Bridge, there was insufficient clearance to pass any cars under the elevated, and no service would ever be provided over the new tracks. Subway construction resumed in 1947, and the current configuration opened on November 6, 1955. The old elevated structure was removed by June 20, 1956. While the track was redirected into the new subway, a short stub of the old elevated structure remained at 45th Street until the reconstruction of the Market Street Elevated in 2008.

In addition to extending the Market Street subway tunnel west to 46th Street, with new stations at 30th, 34th and 40th streets, a new trolley tunnel was built under Market, Ludlow and 36th streets and the former Woodland Avenue, leading to a new western portal at 40th Street for routes 11, 13, 34 and 36 (route 10 trolleys use a separate portal at 36th and Ludlow). New stations for the trolleys were constructed at 22nd, 30th, 33rd (between Market and Ludlow), 36th (at Sansom), and 37th (at Spruce) streets. The 24th Street trolley station and tunnel portal was abandoned. The tunnel mouth was visible from Market Street until the Philadelphia Electric Company (now PECO) built the PECO Building on the site in 1969.

Skip-stop operation began on January 30, 1956. In the original skip-stop configuration, in addition to the A and B stops shown on the map above, 2nd and 34th Street were "A" stations, and Fairmount (replaced by Spring Garden) was a "B" station; the A and B designations at these stations were changed to "All-Stop" because of increased patronage in the 1990s. As I-95 was built through Center City Philadelphia in the late 1970s, part of the Frankford El was relocated to I-95's median, and the Fairmount station was replaced by Spring Garden, on May 16, 1977. Skip-stop operation, which was only available during rush hours on weekdays, was discontinued on February 21, 2020.

=== 21st century ===
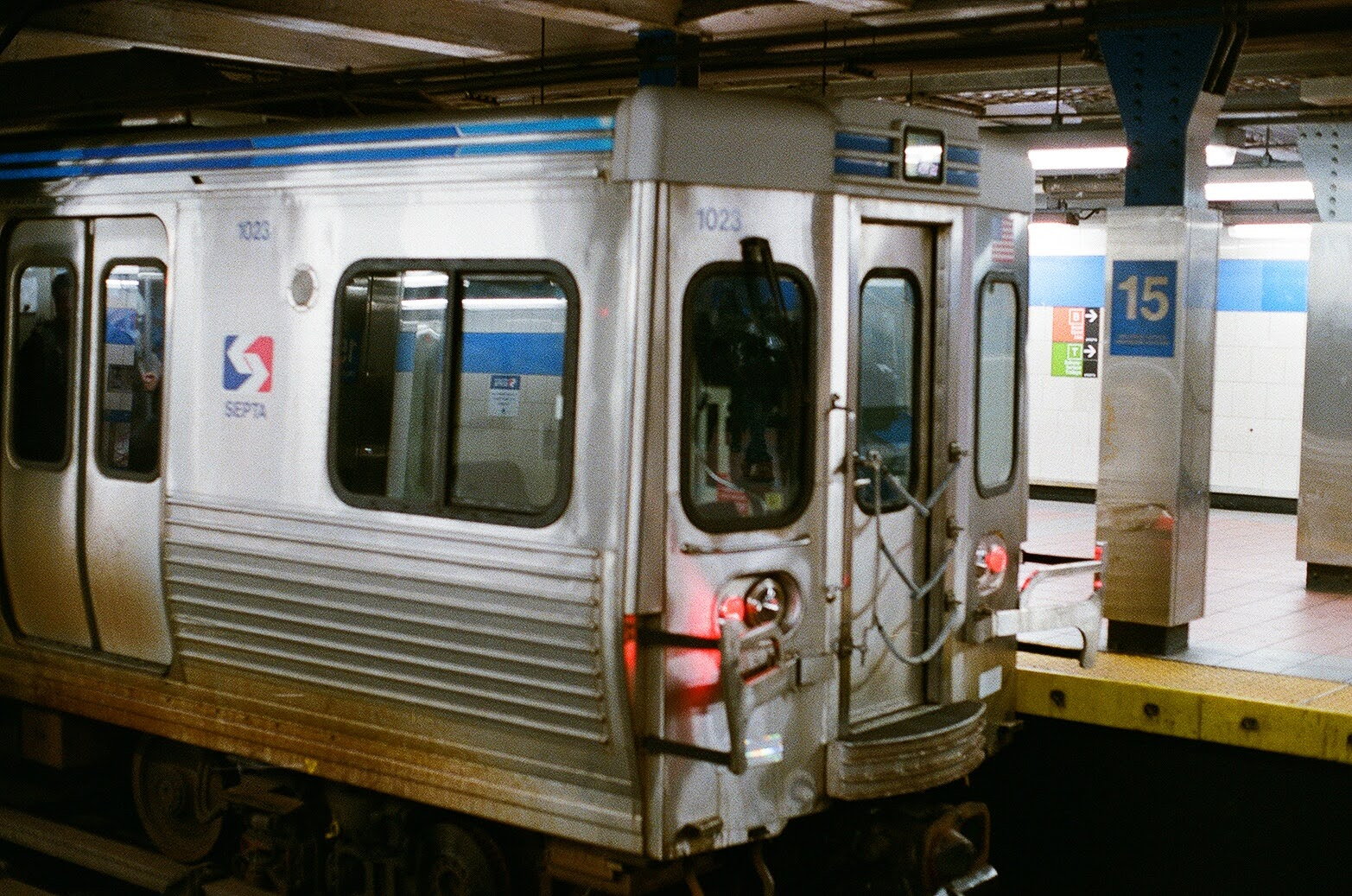
L train at 15th Street station in 2025

Between 1988 and 2003, SEPTA undertook a $493.3 million complete reconstruction of the Frankford side of the Market–Frankford Line between Frankford Transit Center and the 2nd Street portal. The new Frankford Elevated was built with new stringers and deck installed on the original columns, thus giving not only a reduction in cost, but also reducing the street-level impact on adjoining neighborhoods. The old ballasted trackage was replaced with a direct fixation system. In addition to the new Elevated structure, all of the stations were replaced with new stations with higher boarding platforms and elevators, allowing customers with disabilities to easily board and depart from Market-Frankford trains. The reconstruction of the Frankford Elevated structure was mostly complete by 2000, with the exception of the elevated section from Dyre Street, just south of the Bridge-Pratt terminal, to the Frankford Yard entrance. The basic design of the bearings of the reconstructed Frankford Elevated, however, was not appropriate for the repetitive loading from the train traffic. The bearing design did not take into consideration the interaction of the concrete haunches with the steel stringers when loaded by the passing train; and the concrete has started to fracture and drop onto the street below. The problem was first discovered in 1997, but at that time was simply attributed to faulty construction, without evaluation of the root cause. As a temporary fix, SEPTA has installed 10,000 metal mesh belts on the underside of the structure. Estimates for a permanent fix placed the cost at about $20 million, and SEPTA has filed suit against the engineering companies that contributed to the design flaw to recover part of the repair cost. Work on the permanent fix is currently underway.

SEPTA then undertook a $567 million complete reconstruction of the Market Street Elevated between 69th Street Transportation Center and the 44th Street portal between 1999 and 2009. The New Market Street Elevated was an entirely new structure, utilizing single-pillar supports in place of the old-style dual pillar design, allowing the Pennsylvania Department of Transportation (PennDOT) to undertake a planned widening project on Market Street to four lanes between 63rd Street and 44th Street. In addition to the new Elevated structure, all of the stations (including Millbourne) were again replaced with new stations having higher boarding platforms and elevators, allowing customers with disabilities to easily board and depart from trains. The reconstruction of the Market St. Elevated superstructure was completed in 2008, and the last station, 63rd Street, was completed and reopened on May 4, 2009. The Market St. Elevated is not of the same design as the Frankford Elevated, so it does not share any of the Frankford design flaws.

In 2003, the Bridge-Pratt terminal was closed and replaced with the new Frankford Transit Center. After Bridge-Pratt closed, the station platforms and the remaining unrebuilt elevated structure above Frankford Avenue and Bridge Street were demolished. The new $160 million Frankford terminal facility was built on a tract of land off Frankford Avenue formerly part of the adjacent bus and trackless trolley service depot.

In November 2011, the Federal Transit Administration (FTA), through its competitive Fiscal Year 2011 Sustainability Initiative, awarded $1.4 million to SEPTA to install a "wayside energy storage system" on the Market–Frankford Line. The system stores energy from braking trains in a battery that may be used later.

=== Extension proposal ===
An extension of the then-Market–Frankford Line from Frankford to Roosevelt Boulevard and Bustleton Avenue had been proposed in 2011, but no plans or extension construction has taken place.

=== Proposed infill station ===
In the City of Philadelphia's 2021 Transit Plan, one proposal in their list of possible high-capacity transit expansion plans was an infill station located between the L's 15th Street/City Hall and Drexel stations. The 9-block area between the two stations was cited as being a major part of Philadelphia's Central business district since the 1960s. The plan stated that an infill station on the Market—Frankford Line in this part of the city would not only provide better access for major developments, but it would also create transfer opportunities with frequent north–south bus routes on 19th and 20th Streets. However, the 2021 Transit Plan said that while initial studies showed such a station would be feasible and highly beneficial, it would be very difficult and expensive to build.

=== Recent developments ===
The line operated "Lifeline Service" due to the COVID-19 pandemic, with trains bypassing Millbourne, 63rd Street, 13th Street, 5th Street/Independence Hall, 2nd Street, York–Dauphin, Somerset, Tioga, and Church stations as of April 2020. All stations except 5th Street were reopened in June 2020. In 2021, SEPTA proposed rebranding their rail transit service as SEPTA Metro, in order to make the system easier to navigate. Under this proposal, services along the Market–Frankford Line were rebranded as the "L" line with a blue color. Starting in 2024, the line was rebranded as the "L" as part of the implementation of SEPTA Metro, wherein line names are simplified to a single letter.

== Operation ==
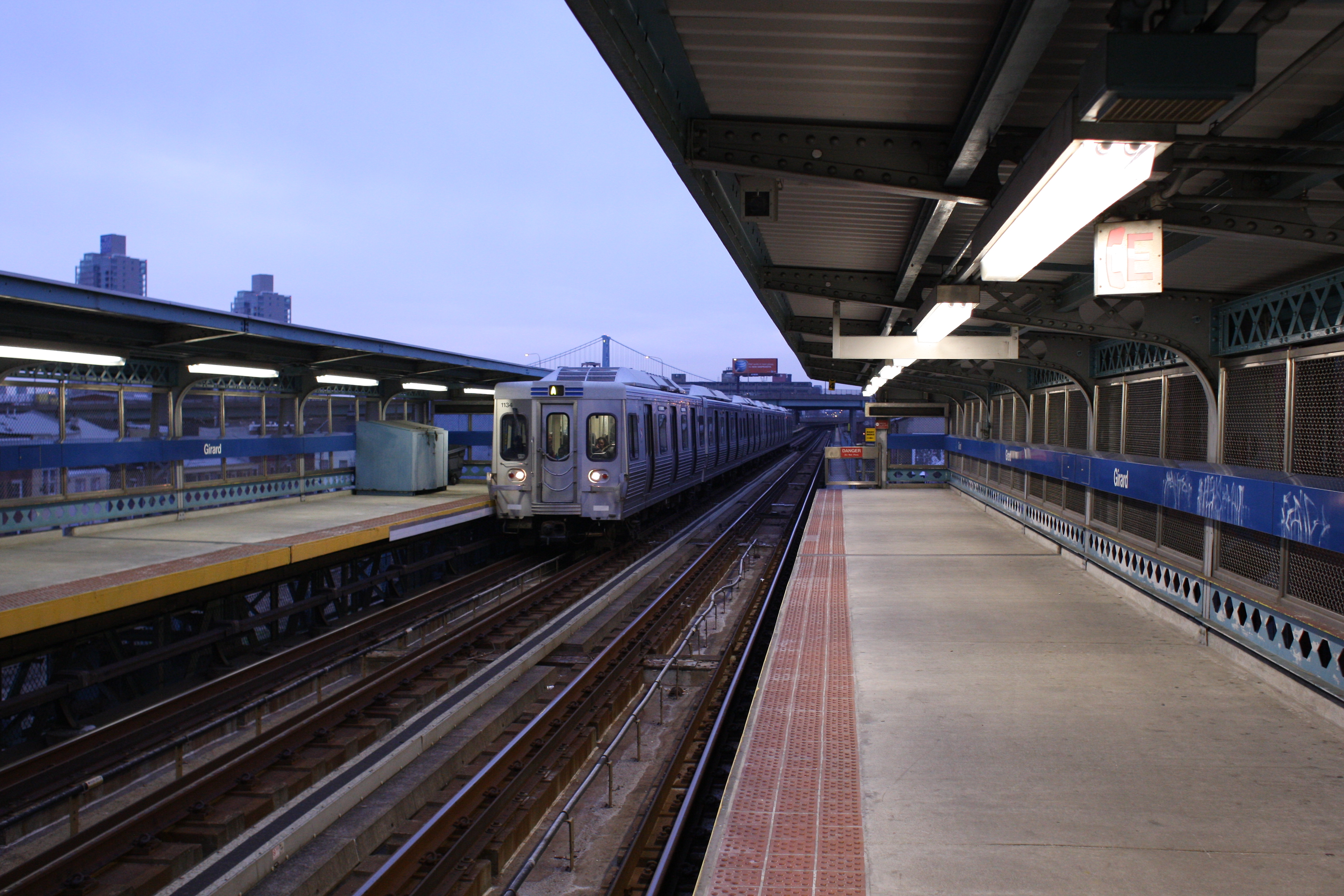
An L Skip-stop A train arriving at Front-Girard

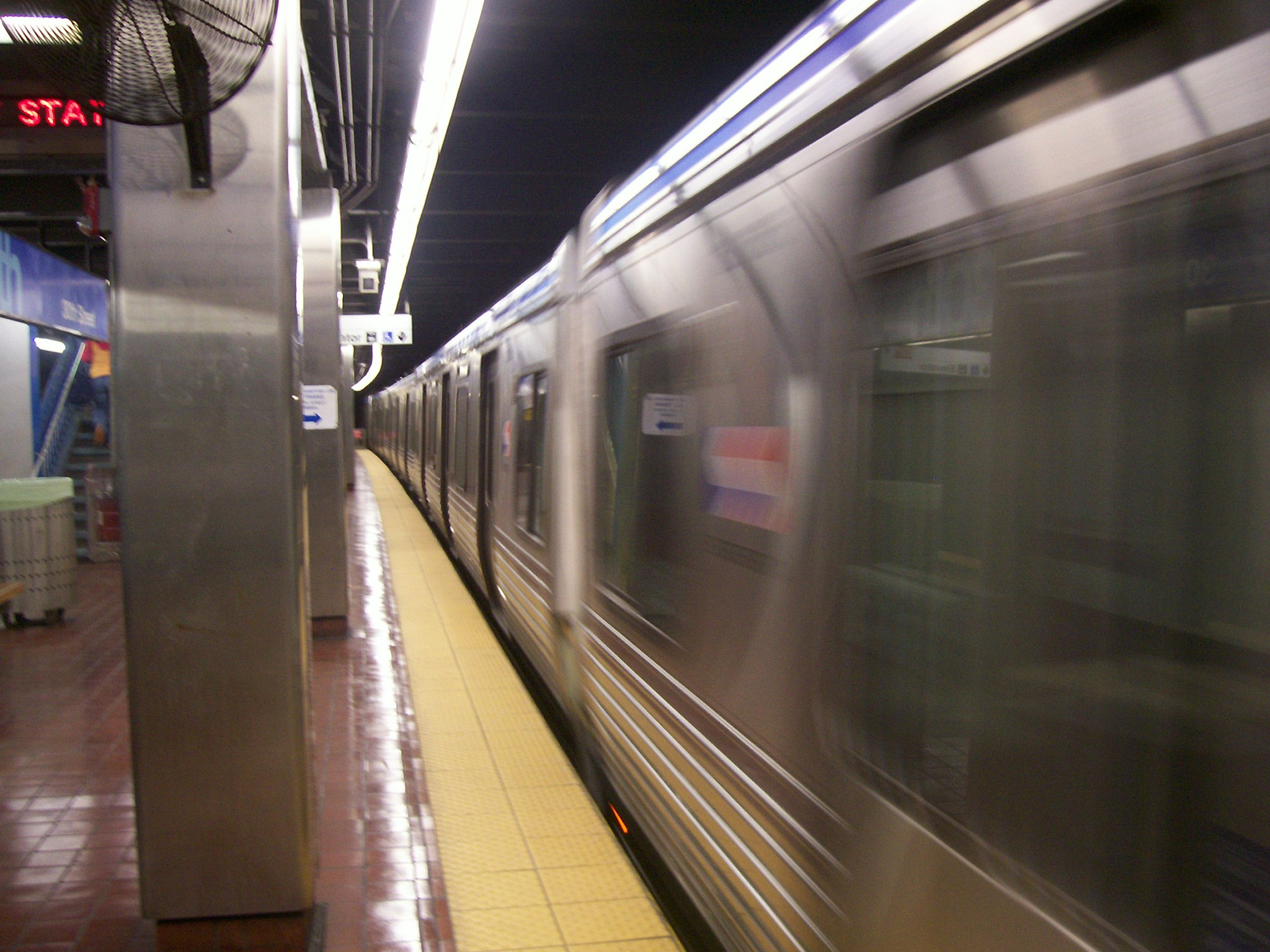
Market–Frankford Line train at what was then known as 30th Street Station (June 2006)

As with many other rail lines, the signal system on the L has progressed from the original lineside block signals using semaphores, to three-aspect Type D color light (green, over yellow, over red) signals, to cab signaling, eliminating the lineside block signals except at interlockings.

The L is unusual as subway–elevated systems go. Its gauge is Pennsylvania trolley gauge of 5 ft 2 1/4 in (1,581 mm). As such, any possible future physical connection to other rapid-transit lines in Philadelphia is limited to cross-platform transfer only, as both the B and the M are standard gauge (4 ft 8 1/2 in (1,435 mm)).

The Market–Frankford Elevated's original construction also had some marked differences from that of other US elevated systems (such as Chicago or New York City). While those systems' elevated lines were built with rails laid on ties (sleepers) that were bolted directly to large steel girders, the L's structure consisted of steel girders supporting a concrete trough deck, which then supported the more conventional railroad construction of rails laid on floating ties with loose rock ballast. This was done in an attempt to reduce noise and vibration, as well as protect the streets below from rain and "operational fluids."

Before February 2020, during rush hours SEPTA operated trains in a skip-stop pattern. Stations were designated as "A" stations, "B" stations, or "All Trains" stations; trains designated as "A" trains skipped "B" stops and vice versa. Skip-stop service ended on February 21, 2020, and was replaced by expanded all-stations service three days later.

The base fare for riding the line is $2.90. The fare can be paid using either the Travel Wallet on a SEPTA Key card, a Quick Trip, or through contactless payments. Until December 1, 2024, Key users or those who utilized contactless payments received a $0.50 discount on the base fare. This discount was eliminated as part of a system-wide fare restructuring. Payment of base fare includes free transfer to the subway–surface lines at Drexel (30th), 15th (15th Street/City Hall), and 13th Street stations, and to the B1 Local and B2 Express (Broad Street Line) at 15th Street. While the B3 (Broad-Ridge Spur) connects at 8th-Market Station, there is no longer a free-transfer passageway between the lines. Transfers are available with contactless payments including SEPTA Key; two free transfers are included.

SEPTA's "TransPass" and "TrailPass" weekly/monthly zone-based passcards loaded on a SEPTA Key card are also accepted as fares.

In FY 2005, 25,220,523 passengers rode the then-Market–Frankford Line. Weekday average ridership of 178,715 made it the busiest line in the entire SEPTA system. The MFL required 142 vehicles at peak hours, cost $86,644,614 in fully allocated expenses, and collected $54,309,344 in passenger revenues, for an impressive farebox recovery ratio of 63 percent.

On February 11, 2008, SEPTA expanded morning and afternoon weekday service with off-peak trains running every six minutes instead of eight. This represents a 12% increase in MFL Service throughout the day.

=== Operating times and headways ===
Trains run from about 5 a.m. to 1 a.m., with a timed transfer at 12:30 a.m. at City Hall station to connect with the Broad Street Line based on final trains. The L Owl bus service replaces the subway throughout the night Monday through Friday mornings, stopping at the same locations as the subway trains. The L runs every six minutes on weekdays (off-peak), every 10 minutes on weekends, every 12 minutes at night, and every 15 minutes during night-owl bus service.

The line ran 24 hours a day until 1991. Weekend late-night hours—5 a.m. on Friday to 1 a.m. on Monday morning—were reinstated on June 20, 2014, a change made permanent on October 8, 2014. During the COVID-19 pandemic, overnight service was replaced by the Owl bus.

A local trip along the entire line takes about 40 minutes. When problems occur, trains can run Express service or skip stations.

== Rolling stock ==
The original cars for the Market Street subway, numbered 1–135 and later designated as Class A-8 by SEPTA's predecessor, the Philadelphia Transportation Company (PTC), were built by the Pressed Steel Car Co. of Pittsburgh, Pa., between 1906 and 1911. An additional set of cars, numbered 136–215, were built by the J.G. Brill Co. of Philadelphia, Pa., between 1911 and 1913. The Frankford Elevated portion opened in 1922 along with another set of cars, numbered 501–600, also built by Brill that year, later receiving the designation Class A-15. The two rail lines were soon merged, resulting in a combined fleet of 315 cars (215 Market Street cars, 100 Frankford cars). By 1960, when the PTC began replacing the cars, the Market Street cars had been in operation for 56 years, thus having the longest lifespan of any Philadelphia subway cars, surpassing that of the original Broad Street subway fleet, which had 54 years of operation. The Frankford cars phased out at 38 years of operation. After retirement, two of the "Market" cars (cars 69 and 163) and six of the "Frankford" cars – cars 532, 551, 559, 583, 585, and 589 – were retained as work train cars for some time. It is currently unknown when these cars were withdrawn, but all had been removed from SEPTA property by the 1970s, with none reported to have been saved for museums.

The "Market" and "Frankford" cars were replaced by a fleet of 270 new stainless steel cars built in 1960 by the Budd Company. The PTC had designated Class A-49 cars numbered 601–646 as Class A-49, and numbers 701–924 as A-50 and A-51. All cars were re-designated as Class M-3 when SEPTA assumed operation of the line. The cars had been nicknamed "Almond Joys" by many riders as their distinctive ventilation fan housings resembled the almonds atop the Peter Paul (now Hershey's) Almond Joy bar. These cars, while mostly an improvement in quality compared to their predecessors, had been plagued with faulty wheel frame assemblies, causing the body to shake, sometimes violently, as the car moved. The cars' fan housings had provisions for air conditioning units, however, only one car, number 614, had ever been air conditioned, which the transit authority had found to be uneconomical at the time. The Budd Company subsequently licensed their stainless steel car designs to Tokyu Car Corporation of Japan, who built the Tokyu 7000 series (1st generation) based on the Class M-3 design, and it also formed the basis of a never-built R39 lightweight subway car order intended for the oldest elevated lines of the New York City Subway.

Early in their service lives, some M-3 cars had fareboxes by their center side doors; these were necessary for collecting fares during the hours after midnight, when SEPTA closed cashier's booths at many stations during the era of 24-hour rapid transit service. "Night Owl" service (midnight–5:00 AM) trains operated on a twenty-minute headway (interval between trains) at that time. SEPTA now operates (along with the Broad Street subway) all "Owl" service using buses, but similar to the old "Owl" trains, they run between 69th Street and Frankford Transit Center on a slightly more frequent 15-minute interval.

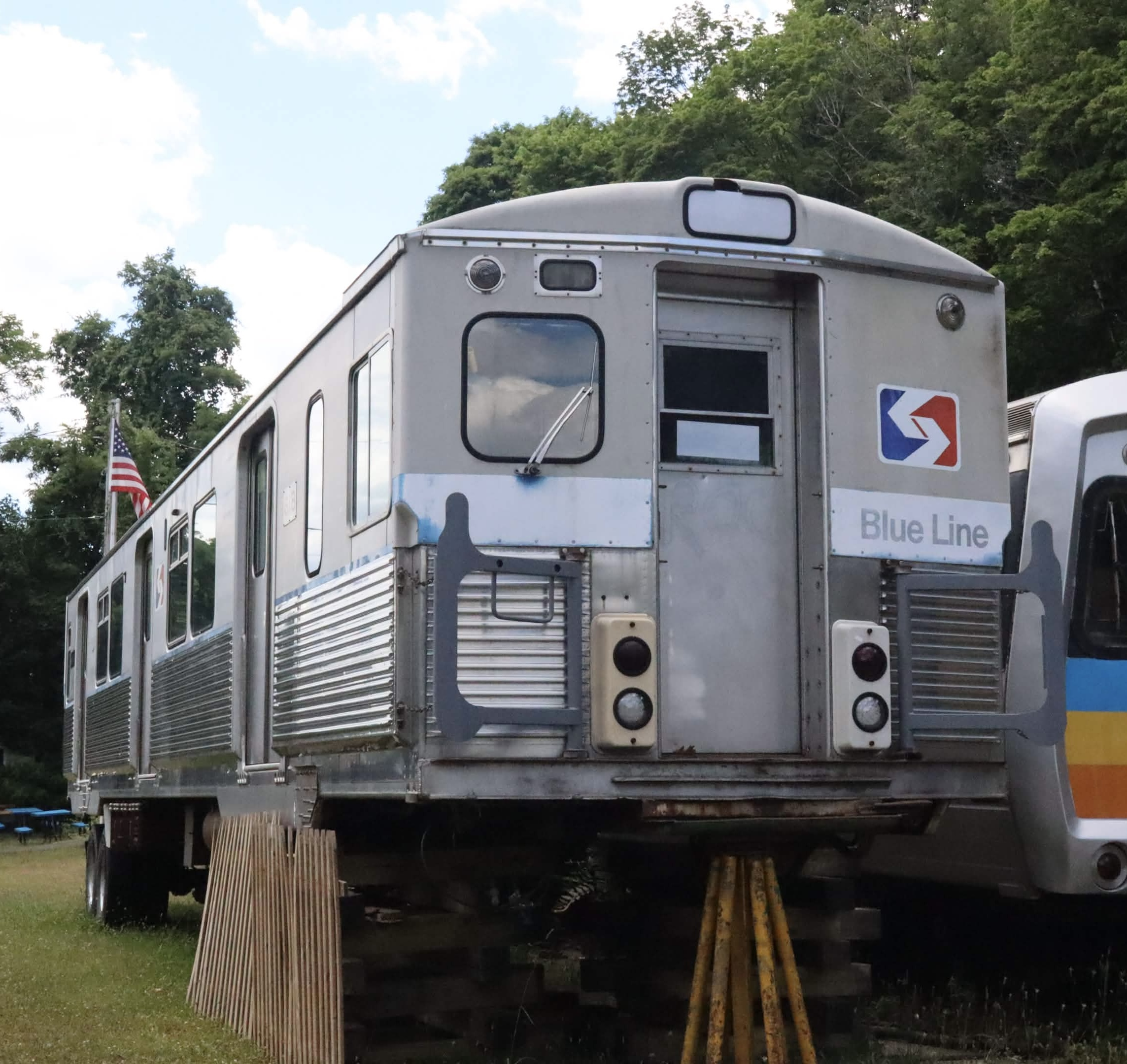
Preserved Budd M-3 railcar at the Trolley Museum of New York

During the late 1980s and early 1990s, some M-3s were re-gauged to work on the Norristown High Speed Line during the delivery of the N-5 cars.

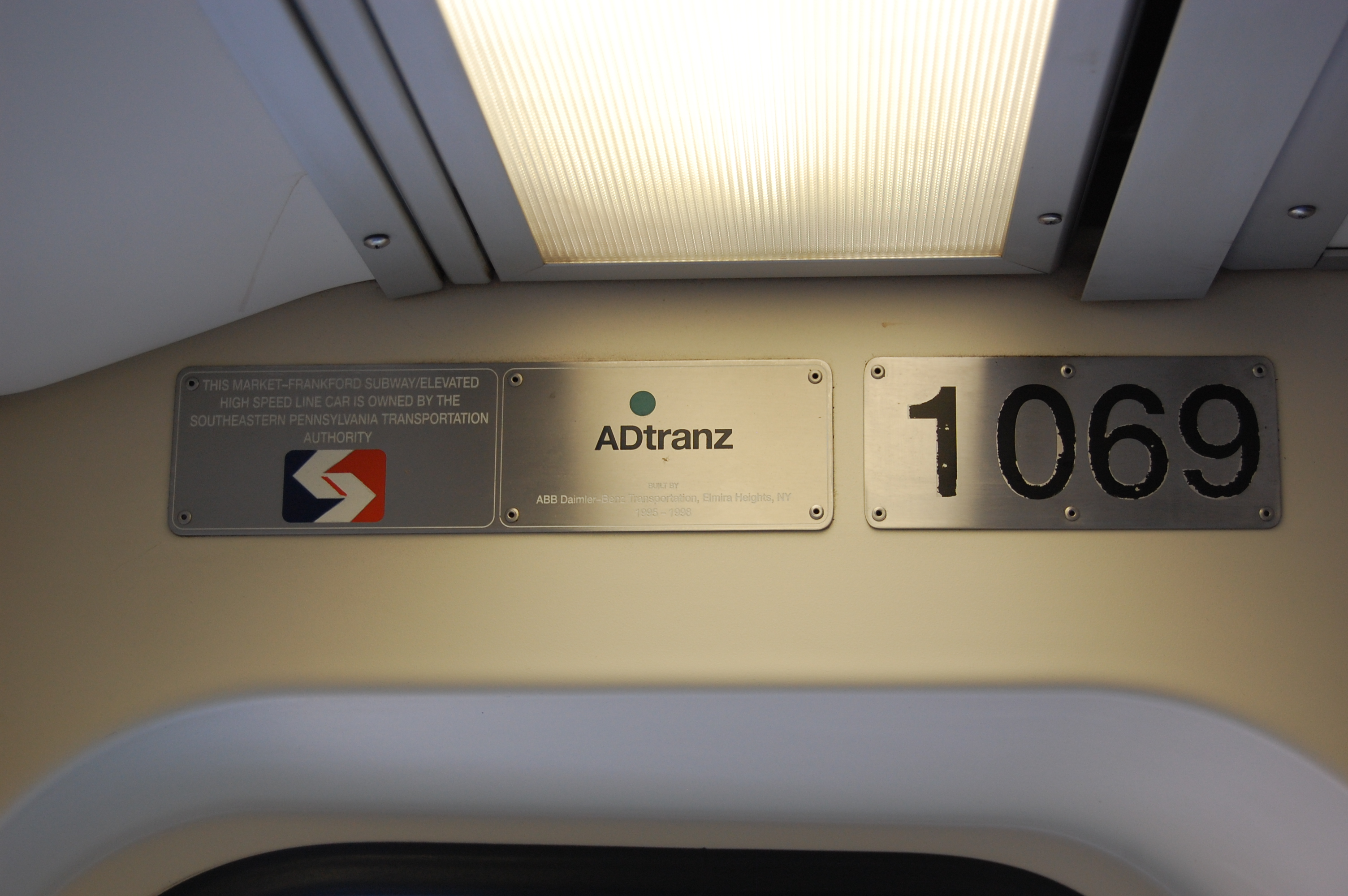
M-4 car placard

In the early 1990s, the then-Market–Frankford Line was in need of new rolling stock. The M-3 cars were approaching the end of their expected useful lifespan, as well as being increasingly scrutinized for their shaky ride quality and lack of air conditioning. SEPTA placed an order for 220 new rail cars, each costing $1.29 million.

These cars, designated Class M-4, were manufactured by Adtranz (later Bombardier, now Alstom) at the Dandenong rolling stock factory in Australia and shipped to Elmira, New York for their final assembly. Delivered between 1997 and 1999, these cars are equipped with AC traction motors, air conditioning, LED signage, and automated announcements. All of the M-3 cars were retired after the last of the M-4's entered service, with five of the former being converted to work cars. The five remaining M-3's were later retired, with M-4 cars 1033 and 1034 replacing them for work service, and the last of the remaining M-3's had been scrapped by 2005. Two of the M-3's have been preserved, cars 606 and 618 at the Pennsylvania Trolley Museum and the Trolley Museum of New York (previously Seashore Trolley Museum until 2024), respectively. These cars represent the only preserved examples of Market—Frankford Line rolling stock.

In February 2017, SEPTA temporarily removed about 90 M-4 cars from service after inspections revealed cracks and signs of fatigue in load-bearing bolsters and associated components.

On July 4, 2022, SEPTA began the process to obtain a new M-5 fleet to replace the M-4 cars. The Federal Transit Administration gave SEPTA $317 million in February 2024 to fund the purchase of the new rolling stock. As per the SEPTA Board Meeting documents for July 25, 2024, SEPTA will order 200 M-5 cars from Hitachi Rail STS, with two option orders of 20 cars each. The pilot cars are expected to arrive in fall 2028, with the first production cars arriving spring 2029 and the final production cars arriving by spring 2031.

Electric Multiple Units
Year	Make	Model	Numbers	Length	Width	Height	Status	Notes
1906–1911	Pressed Steel Company	M-1	1–135				Retired	
1911–1913	J. G. Brill Company	M-1	136–215				Retired	
1922	J. G. Brill Company	M-2	501–600				Retired	
1960	Budd Company	M-3 (A-49)	601–646				Retired	Single Units
1960	Budd Company	M-3 (A-50/A-51)	701–924	55 ft	9 ft 1in	12 ft 1in	Retired	Married Pairs
1997–	Adtranz	M-4	1001–1220	55 ft 2in		13 ft	In service	Married Pairs, 20 cars decommissioned as of December 2024
2028–	Hitachi Rail STS	M-5					Proposed, contract awarded	First sets of trains to have open-gangways

== Accidents ==
On December 26, 1961, one man died and 38 others were injured when four cars of a train derailed while rounding the curve just north of York-Dauphin Station. The deceased was identified as Earl Giberson, a 64-year-old man.

On March 7, 1990, four people died and another 162 injured when the rear three cars of six-car train #61 derailed after leaving what was then 30th Street station westbound at 8:20 a.m. It is believed that one of the traction motors dropped out of the rear truck on the third car (M3) somewhere between 15th and 30th Street stations, and it became entangled in a switch immediately upon leaving 30th Street station. The front truck of the fourth car (M3 #818) followed the third car, while the rear truck of the fourth car took the diverging track, causing the car to shear halfway upon striking the steel pillars separating the tracks beyond the switch.

On February 21, 2017, a train derailed at the 69th Street Station loop after it crashed into a stopped train and caused a third train on an adjacent track to derail, seriously injuring one of the operators and injuring three others.

On September 16, 2017, the front car derailed at Spring Garden Station heading to Frankford TC. Nobody was severely injured, but one person was treated for heat exhaustion during the evacuation.

== Stations ==
All connections, unless otherwise noted, are operated by SEPTA.

Station	Miles (km)	Connections	Weekday Ridership (2018)	Notes
69th Street T.C.	0.0 (0)	SEPTA Metro: SEPTA City Bus: 21, 30, 65, 68; SEPTA Suburban Bus: 103, 104, 105, 107, 108, 109, 110, 111, 112, 113, 120, 123, 126	17,680	Western terminus, in Upper Darby
Millbourne	0.4 (0.6)		489	Originally named 66th Street
63rd Street	0.8 (1.3)	SEPTA City Bus: 21, 31	2,236	
60th Street	1.1 (1.8)	SEPTA City Bus: 31, 46	5,432	Rebuilt station opened June 18, 2007
56th Street	1.5 (2.4)	SEPTA City Bus: 31, 63	6,238	Rebuilt station opened February 27, 2006
52nd Street	1.9 (3.1)	SEPTA City Bus: 31, 52	7,498	
46th Street	2.5 (4.0)	SEPTA City Bus: 31, 64	5,011	Rebuilt station opened April 14, 2008
40th Street	3.2 (5.1)	SEPTA Metro: (diverted/nighttime routes only); SEPTA City Bus: 30, 40, 79, LUCY	6,624	Original station was elevated
34th Street	3.7 (6.0)	SEPTA City Bus: 30, 31, 49, LUCY	7,076	Original station at 36th Street was elevated
Drexel Station at 30th Street	4.1 (6.6)	Amtrak (at 30th Street Station); SEPTA Regional Rail: all lines (at 30th Street Station); NJ Transit Rail: ACL Atlantic City Line (at 30th Street Station); SEPTA Metro: SEPTA City Bus: 9, 30, 31, 44, 49, LUCY; SEPTA Suburban Bus: 124, 125; NJ Transit Bus: 313, 315, 316, 414, 417, 555	7,704	Original station at 32nd Street was elevated
15th Street/City Hall	5.1 (8.2)	SEPTA Regional Rail: all lines (at Suburban Station); SEPTA Metro: SEPTA City Bus: 4, 16, 17, 27, 31, 32, 33, 38, 44, 48; SEPTA Suburban Bus: 124, 125; NJ Transit Bus: 313, 315, 316, 414, 417, 555 (at Market St & 16th St Exit)	34,384+	Access to City Hall
13th Street	5.4 (8.7)	SEPTA Metro: SEPTA City Bus: 17, 33, 38, 44, 48; SEPTA Suburban Bus: 124, 125; NJ Transit Bus: 313, 315, 316, 317, 400, 401, 402, 404, 406, 408, 409, 410, 412, 551	8,146	Eastern terminal for trolley lines Access to Wanamaker Building
~~11th Street~~	5.6 (9.0)	SEPTA Regional Rail: all lines (at Jefferson Station); SEPTA City Bus: 17, 23, 33, 38, 44, 45, 48; NJ Transit Bus: 313, 315, 316, 317, 400, 401, 402, 404, 406, 408, 409, 410, 412, 414, 417, 551, 555; Intercity Buses: Greyhound, Megabus, FlixBus, Peter Pan(at Philadelphia Parking Authority Transportation Center)	8,629	Access to Fashion District Philadelphia; Temporarily closed until 2027
8th–Market	5.8 (9.3)	DRPA: PATCO Lindenwold Line; SEPTA Metro: SEPTA City Bus: 17, 33, 38, 44, 47, 61; NJ Transit Bus: 313, 315, 316, 317, 400, 401, 402, 404, 406, 408, 409, 410, 412, 414, 417, 551, 555	11,019	
5th Street/Independence Hall	6.0 (9.7)	SEPTA City Bus: 17, 33, 38, 44, 48	3,986	Access to Independence NHP.
2nd Street	6.3 (10.1)	SEPTA City Bus: 5, 17, 44 (west), 48	3,928	Access to Old City District and Penn's Landing
Spring Garden	7.1 (11.4)	SEPTA City Bus: 5, 25, 43, 76	3,275	Replaced Fairmount station in 1977 due to the construction of I-95
Front–Girard	7.8 (12.6)	SEPTA Metro: SEPTA City Bus: 5, 25	5,154	
Berks	8.5 (13.7)	SEPTA City Bus: 3	2,653	
York–Dauphin	8.9 (14.3)	SEPTA City Bus: 3, 39	1,738	Original name was Dauphin-York
Huntingdon	9.3 (15.0)	SEPTA City Bus: 3, 39, 54	2,956	
Somerset	9.6 (15.4)	SEPTA City Bus: 3, 54, 76	2,246	
Kensington–Allegheny	10.2 (16.4)	SEPTA City Bus: 3, 60	6,109	
Tioga	10.6 (17.1)	SEPTA City Bus: 3	1,881	Original northbound station building is preserved.
Erie–Torresdale	11.3 (18.2)	SEPTA City Bus: 3, 53, 56	4,544	Originally named Torresdale
Church	11.8 (19.0)	SEPTA City Bus: 3, 5	1,291	Originally named Ruan–Church
Arrott Transit Center	12.3 (19.8)	SEPTA City Bus: 3, 5, 41, K SEPTA Trackless Trolley: 59, 75	4,737	Named Margaret–Orthodox until 2014. Originally named Margaret–Orthodox–Arrott.
Frankford T.C.	12.9 (20.8)	SEPTA City Bus: 3, 5, 8, 14, 19, 20, 24, 25, 26, 50, 58, 67, 72, 73, 82, 84, 88, Boulevard Direct; SEPTA Trackless Trolley: 66	19,052	Eastern terminus, station replaced Bridge–Pratt
