= Somerset (disambiguation) =

Somerset is a county in England.

Somerset may also refer to:

== Places ==
=== Australia ===
- Somerset College (Australia), a Christian school in Mudgeeraba, Gold Coast
- Somerset Region, local government area in South East Queensland
- Lake Somerset, in Queensland
- Somerset, Queensland
- Somerset, Tasmania

=== Bermuda ===
- Somerset Island, Bermuda
- Somerset Village, Bermuda

=== Canada ===
- Somerset, Calgary, a neighborhood in Alberta
- Somerset, Kings County, Nova Scotia
- Somerset, Lunenburg County, Nova Scotia
- Somerset, Manitoba, an unincorporated community
  - Somerset Aerodrome, located southwest of Somerset, Manitoba
- Somerset, Quebec, the original name of Plessisville, Quebec
- Somerset Island (Nunavut), a large, uninhabited island
- Somerset Ward, in the city of Ottawa, Ontario

=== Singapore ===
- Somerset MRT station, an underground station

=== South Africa ===
- Somerset East, a town in the Eastern Cape
- Somerset West, a town in the Western Cape
- Somerset, Mpumalanga, a rural settlement also known by its local name Mahlobyanini

=== United Kingdom ===
- Somerset (villa), a villa in Kinnoull, Scotland

=== United States ===
- Somerset, El Dorado County, California
- Somerset, Siskiyou County, California
- Somerset, Colorado
- Somerset, Illinois
- Somerset, Indiana
- Somerset, Kansas
- Somerset, Kentucky
- Somerset County, Maine
- Somerset, Maryland
- Somerset County, Maryland
- Somerset, Massachusetts
- Somerset Township, Michigan
  - Somerset, Michigan
  - Somerset Center, Michigan
- Somerset Collection, a mall in Troy, Michigan
- Somerset Township, Minnesota
- Somerset, Nebraska
- Somerset, Mercer County, New Jersey
- Somerset, New Jersey, in Somerset County
  - Somerset Airport (New Jersey), a public-use airport in Somerset County
- Somerset County, New Jersey
- Somerset, New York
- Somerset, Ohio
- Somerset, Pennsylvania
- Somerset County, Pennsylvania
- Somerset Township, Somerset County, Pennsylvania
- Somerset Township, Washington County, Pennsylvania
- Somerset (SEPTA station), a rapid transit station in Philadelphia, Pennsylvania
- Somerset, Texas
- Somerset, Vermont
- Somerset, Virginia
- Somerset (Powhatan, Virginia)
- Somerset, Washington
- Somerset (town), Wisconsin
- Somerset, Wisconsin, a village
- Somerset Villa, a demolished mansion in Durham, North Carolina

== Ships ==
- SAS Somerset, a 1941 ship of the South African Navy
- HMS Somerset (1698), a three-decker 80-gun third rate ship
- HMS Somerset (1731), an 80-gun third rate ship of the line of the Royal Navy
- HMS Somerset (1748), a 70-gun third-rate ship of the line of the Royal Navy
- HMS Somerset (F82), launched in 1994
- USS Somerset (1862), a side wheel ferryboat
- USS Somerset (AK-212), an Alamosa-class cargo ship launched in January 1945
- USS Somerset (LPD-25), a 2012 San Antonio-class amphibious transport dock
- USS Somerset (1917), a wooden motorboat of the US Navy

== People with the surname ==
- Somerset (surname)

== People with the given name ==
- Somerset Davies (1754–1817), English politician
- Plantagenet Somerset Fry (1931–1996), British historian and author
- W. Somerset Maugham (1874–1965), English author
- Somerset Maxwell, 8th Baron Farnham (1803–1884), MP for Cavan
- Somerset Maxwell, 10th Baron Farnham (1849–1900), Irish Representative peer
- Somerset Arthur Maxwell (1905–1942), MP for King's Lynn
- Somerset R. Waters (1829–1919), American politician from Maryland
- Samoset (1590–1653), or Somerset, Native American subordinate chief

== Other uses ==
- Somerset (TV series), a 1970s spinoff of Another World
- Somerset (In Death), a character in the novel series
- Somerset (UK Parliament constituency)
- Somerset (European Parliament constituency)
- Somerset Council, a unitary authority in the South West of England
- Buick Somerset, automobile produced by General Motors from 1985 to 1987
- Somerset Books, UK family-owned publisher of the Blue Guides series of travel books
- Austin A40 Somerset, a British motor car produced 1952–54

== See also ==
- Somersault, an acrobatic feat
- Somerset Hospital (disambiguation)
- Somerset Mall (disambiguation)
- Duchess of Somerset (disambiguation)
- Duke of Somerset, a title in the English peerage
- Lord Somerset (disambiguation)
- Summerset (disambiguation)
