= Somerset, Nova Scotia =

Somerset, Nova Scotia could mean the following:

- Somerset in Kings County
- Somerset in Lunenburg County
