= SEPTA Route 60 =

Bus route in Philadelphia

Route 60
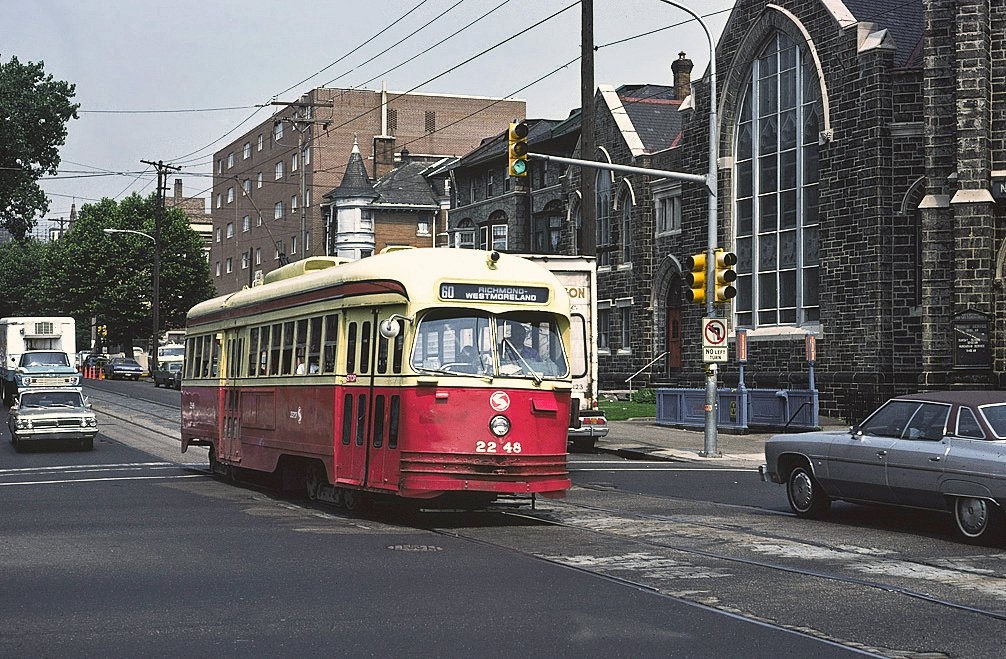
- The Route 60 trolley at the intersection of Allegheny Avenue and North Broad Street during May 1976.

Overview
- Operator: Southeastern Pennsylvania Transportation Authority
- Garage: Luzerne Depot
- Began service: 1906
- Ended service: 1977 (as a streetcar line)

Route
- Locale: Philadelphia
- Communities served: East Falls, Swampoodle, Tioga, Harrowgate, Port Richmond
- Start: East Falls Loop
- Via: Allegheny Avenue
- End: Richmond-Westmoreland Streets Loop
- Length: 5.6 miles (9.0 km)

Service
- Journey time: 29 minute
- Ridership: 2,968,097 (FY2019)

Route 60 is a former streetcar line and current bus route, operated by the Southeastern Pennsylvania Transportation Authority (SEPTA) in Northwest and Northeast Philadelphia, Pennsylvania, United States. It connects to the East Falls to the Port Richmond, and runs primarily along Allegheny Avenue.

== Route description ==
The route starts at a loop in the vicinity of 35th Street and Allegheny Avenue. It is a route shared with the SEPTA Route 1 and Route R bus lines until it reaches the five-way intersection between US 13 (West Hunting Park Avenue) and Henry Avenue, where the two bus lines move away from Allegheny Avenue and go northeast on US 13. Also near the intersection are Mercy Vocational High School as well as SEPTA Route 32 and the northern terminus of SEPTA Route 48.

Continuing eastbound, Route 60 encounters the intersection of 22nd Street which leads to Allegheny Regional Railroad Station on the Manayunk/Norristown Line. It is one of three stations named after the street that carries most of Route 60. Both the Manayunk/Norristown and the Chestnut Hill West Line cross over Allegheny Avenue and Route 60 at the northeast corner of 21st Street. After the two bridges, it enters the Allegheny West neighborhood, skipping past 20th and 19th Streets, before passing under the Lansdale/Doylestown Line between North Broad and Wayne Junction stations. Route 60 provides no access to this line, but at the intersection with Broad Street it does allow access to Allegheny station on the Broad Street Subway Line, which is the second SEPTA station to be named after the street.

Immediately after the intersection with Germantown Avenue and the SEPTA Route 23 line, the Trenton Line interrupts Allegheny Avenue, forcing Route 60 northeast onto Sedgley Avenue. Sedgley runs along the north side of the Trenton Line until it reaches Erie Avenue, which carries the SEPTA Route 56 line. Allegheny Avenue resumes at the eastern terminus of Westmoreland Avenue and southern terminus of 9th Street, then goes south under the Trenton Line until it reaches Glenwood Avenue, which runs along the South Side of the Trenton Line. After Glenwood, Allegheny Avenue and Route 60 resume their previous alignment.

When Route 60 meets Kensington Avenue beneath Allegheny station along the Market-Frankford Line in Harrowgate, Allegheny Avenue ends its run as an east-west road, and turns southeast-to-northwest. This is the third and last station to be named after the street. The next major intersection along the route is Frankford Avenue, which the Market-Frankford Line runs above northeast of this intersection. In between Frankford and Aramingo Avenues, Route 60 passes by Northeastern Hospital.

Most Route 60 buses make a left turn onto Richmond Street and terminate at the Richmond-Westmoreland Loop, which is also the eastern terminus for SEPTA Route 15. Limited service south of Richmond Street exists across I-95 to Delaware Avenue and the Tioga Marine Terminal, then north to Lewis Street across I-95 again, and back west on Richmond Street to Richmond-Westmoreland Loop. This Limited Service was removed, but Service to Wissahickon Transit Center was added on August 23rd 2026. For buses that head to Wissahickon Transit Center, they continue past 35th & Allegheny, then go via Ridge Avenue, then reach the terminal.

== History ==
The Allegheny Avenue trolley was established in 1906 and ran between Richmond Street and 17th Street. In 1910 the line was extended west to Ridge Avenue, partially on Lehigh Avenue between 17th and 21st Streets (past the site of Shibe Park, the 1909 home of the Philadelphia Athletics). Between 1923 and 1939, Philadelphia Rapid Transit (PRT) Route 60 was split with an extension from 21st Street and Ridge Avenue known as Route 60A, while Route 60 itself ran between 21st Street and Richmond Avenue.

This discontinuity of Route 60 between 17th and 21st Streets existed in order to avoid crossing three different railroad lines at grade between those streets that were present when the trolley line was first established in 1906: the Reading Railroad's Ninth Street Branch (now part of SEPTA's Main Line), the Chestnut Hill Branch of the Pennsylvania Railroad, and the Reading's Norristown Branch, in westward succession, all featuring extremely heavy passenger traffic. The crossings of the first two lines were eliminated in 1911 and 1916, but the latter one, which crossed at a hazardous acute angle (and was electrified in 1933) remained until 1939. In that year, trolley tracks were finally installed between 17th and 21st as the Reading completed a project grade-separating the branch (now SEPTA's Manayunk/Norristown Line) over Allegheny, 21st and 22nd Streets through the neighborhood.

Unlike the vast majority of trolley routes in Philadelphia, Route 60 never utilized either the 1,500 single-ended Nearside cars or the 535 8000-series Peter Witt cars, and was operated with double-ended cars by PRT and successor Philadelphia Transportation Company until 1956. On February 24 of that year, a loop was constructed at 35th and Allegheny, and the line's eastern terminus was soon changed from the Richmond & Allegheny crossover to the adjacent Richmond & Westmoreland loop used by Route 15, thus allowing Route 60 to be assigned PCC cars cascaded from Callowhill Depot. These cars, idle during the summer when schools were out, would no longer be needed at Callowhill due to the impending bus conversion of Route 42 and the rerouting of Route 13 into the subway, events which occurred simultaneously over the weekend of September 8–9. Richmond Depot, which had housed the cars that served Route 60 up until this point in time, was closed, and the PCC cars used on the line operated out of Luzerne Depot for the remainder of its existence as a trolley route.

SEPTA replaced the trolleys on Route 60 with buses on September 4, 1977, the first trolley line abandoned in the city since Route 47 in 1969. A shortage of operable trolley cars had plagued SEPTA since a disastrous fire at the Woodland Depot in fall 1975; although 30 used PCCs from Toronto, Ontario were subsequently purchased (and used on routes such as the 60), some of these cars had major end-of-life issues, while SEPTA's maintenance of its existing trolley fleet remained abysmal. Route 60 remained physically intact until a 1983 water main replacement near the intersection of Kensington and Allegheny Avenues required the removal of track; the Philadelphia Water Department was told by SEPTA management that the trackage would not be used again, and thus did not replace it. The overhead was soon removed as well, and the rest of the tracks were paved over by the end of the decade.

Currently, there are no indications that SEPTA has any plans to restore the trolleys along Route 60. The route (along with all SEPTA fixed bus routes) is ADA-compliant, and the buses contain bicycle racks. The line is one of SEPTA's "Night Owl" routes.

On March 23, 2023, SEPTA released their new draft plan for Bus Revolution, a bus network redesign. As part of the plan, Route 60's limited service to Delaware Avenue would be discontinued, and the route would be extended westward to Wissahickon Transportation Center to enable additional transfers. These changes were included in the final plan, approved on May 23, 2024.
