= Somerset micropolitan area =

The Somerset micropolitan area may refer to:

- The Somerset, Pennsylvania micropolitan area, United States
- The Somerset, Kentucky micropolitan area, United States

== See also ==
- Somerset (disambiguation)
