= SEPTA Route 23 =

Philadelphia SEPTA Bus Line

Route 23
- Center City to Chestnut Hill

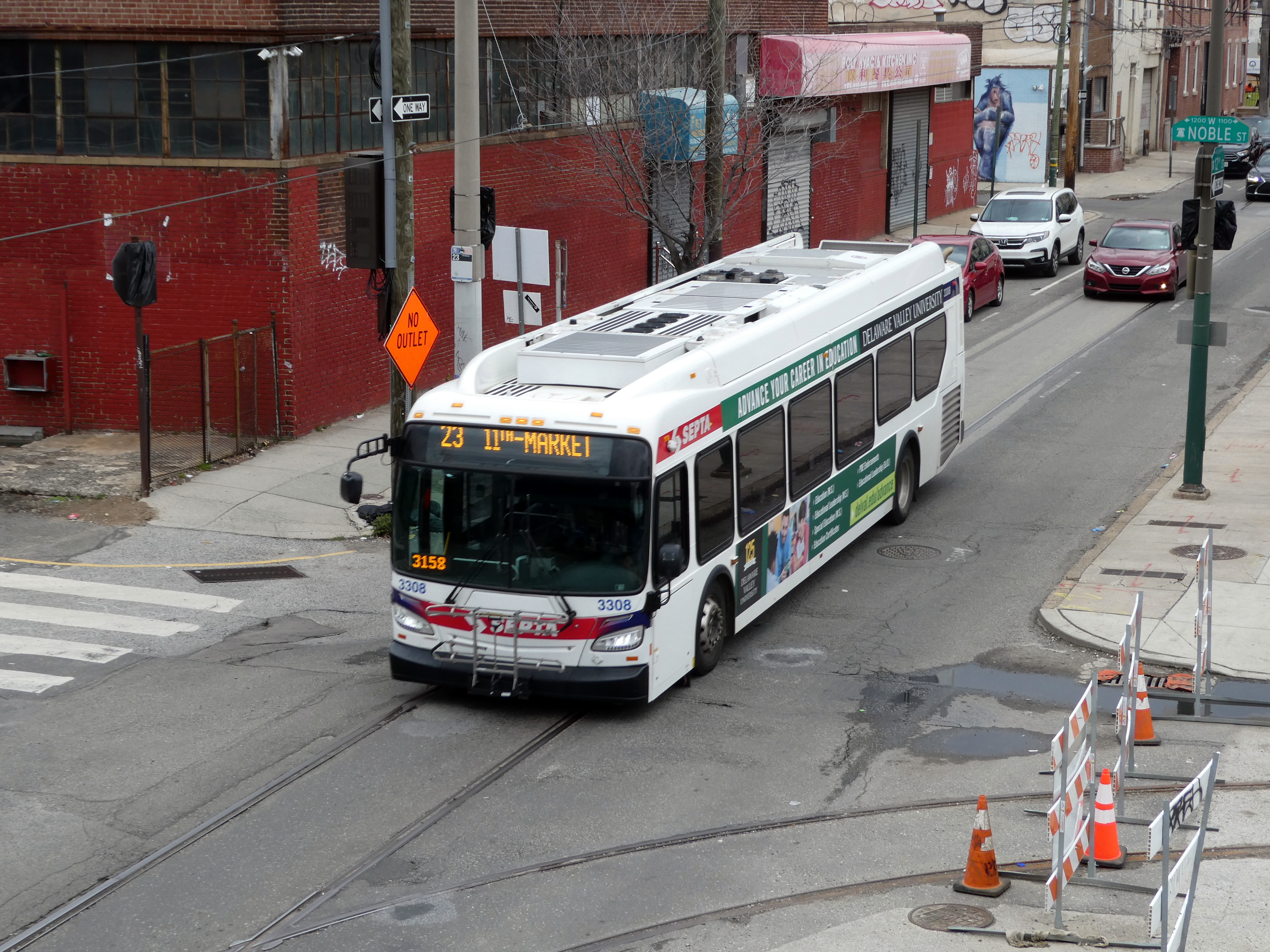
- A southbound route 23 bus in 2022

Overview
- System: Midvale District
- Operator: SEPTA City Transit Division
- Began service: 1859 (horsecar); 1894 (electric trolley); 1992 (bus service)
- Former operator: Philadelphia Transportation Company

Route
- Locale: Philadelphia
- Communities served: North Philadelphia, Northwest Philadelphia, Chinatown
- Start: 11th and Market Streets
- Via: Germantown Avenue; 11th Street (northbound); 12th Street (southbound)
- End: Germantown Avenue and Bethlehem Pike (Chestnut Hill Loop)
- Length: 10.7 mi (17.2 km)

Service
- Frequency: 8-15 minutes (6am-9pm)
- Weekend frequency: 15-40 minutes
- Ridership: 13,117 (2019 weekday average)
- Timetable: Route 23 schedule

Route 23 is a former streetcar line and current bus route. It is operated by the Southeastern Pennsylvania Transportation Authority (SEPTA) in Philadelphia, Pennsylvania, United States. The line runs between the Chestnut Hill and Center City neighborhoods via Germantown Avenue, 11th, and 12th Streets.

Route 23 was once Philadelphia's longest streetcar route, extending south to 11th St. and Pattison Avenue in South Philadelphia, and was one of three suspended by SEPTA in 1992. Route 23 was also believed to be the longest trolley route within a city in the world. A restoration of trolley service was proposed in recent years, with a feasibility study planned between 2021 and 2027.

The route is consistently one of SEPTA's most heavily-traveled bus lines, coming in as the fourth-busiest for daily ridership in 2018, as well as an average weekday ridership of 14,322.

== Route description ==
Route 23 begins in Center City Philadelphia. The southern terminal is the intersection of 11th and Market streets, adjacent to the Market–Frankford Line's 11th Street station, although southbound buses continue as far south as Locust Street before turning northbound. From Center City, the line runs northbound on 11th Street and southbound on 12th Street.

In North Philadelphia, northbound Route 23 turns east to Huntingdon Street and then north again to Germantown Avenue, while southbound Route 23 moves from 10th Street west to Susquehanna Avenue and south again to 12th Street. Route 23 then continues northwest on Germantown Avenue through North Philadelphia, which includes a six-way intersection with Erie Avenue and Broad Street, providing transfers to Routes 53 and 56 on Erie as well as the Broad Street Line at Erie station. Routes 53 and 56 are actually also other former streetcar lines that were converted into bus routes. Another major connection along the route is the Wayne Junction station, which serves six SEPTA Regional Rail commuter lines.

As Route 23 enters Northwest Philadelphia, it runs through the Germantown and Mount Airy neighborhoods before entering Chestnut Hill. The route's northern terminus is the Chestnut Hill bus loop at the intersection of Germantown Avenue and Bethlehem Pike, located adjacent to the Chestnut Hill West regional rail station and a short distance from the Chestnut Hill East station.

Overnight service short-turns at Ontario Street near Temple University Hospital, only serving the Germantown Avenue portion of the route.

== History ==
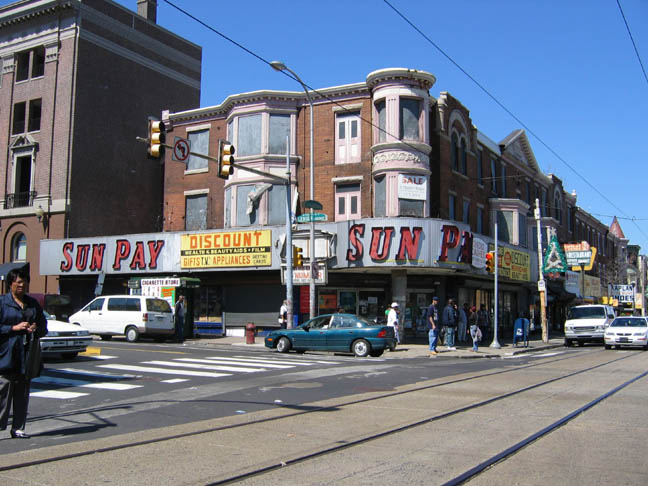
Surviving streetcar tracks at Germantown and Lehigh avenues

=== Streetcar service ===
Route 23 was established sometime prior to 1877 as the Germantown Avenue Line, and ran from Germantown Depot to 8th and Dauphin streets. In 1890 the line was extended to the 4th and 8th Street trolleys and renamed the Pelham Line. It was combined with the Mermaid and Chestnut Hill Line in 1913, and renamed the Germantown, 10th and 11th Streets Line. The northern terminus was extended to the Bethlehem Pike Loop in 1920, while the southern terminus was extended to 11th Street and Pattison Avenue in 1926, and to 10th Street and Bigler Avenue in 1957.

On December 29, 1957, the Route 20 trolley on 12th and 13th Streets was abandoned and combined with the 23, which thereafter operated on 11th and 12th Streets just as it does today. Route 20 service on 13th Street and to Olney Terminal was eliminated with this merge.

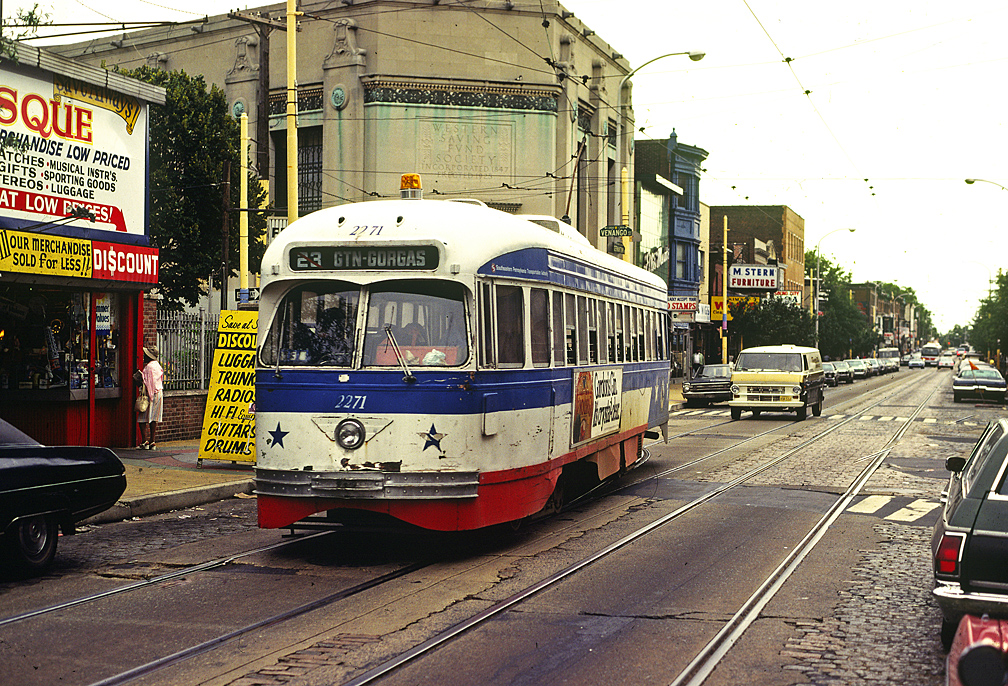
A Route 23 PCC Streetcar on Germantown Avenue at Venango Street in 1980.

PCC cars were introduced to the line in 1947 and 1948, replacing Nearside cars which had operated the route since the teens. The Philadelphia Transportation Company (PTC) attempted to introduce a fleet of 100 PCCs to the line in 1942, but an insufficient power supply for climbing Chestnut Hill caused these cars to be sent to Luzerne Depot to serve other routes instead. After World War II and its materials shortages and restrictions ended, a substation was built at Germantown Avenue and Mermaid Lane, and PTC assigned 85 new PCCs to the line; the difference in number of cars was due to postwar ridership declines.

On September 5, 1976, the Route 23 trolleys were moved from Germantown Depot to Luzerne Depot, making Luzerne the operating depot for the six remaining North Philadelphia streetcar routes: 6, 23, 50, 53, 56, and 60. A pamphlet was issued by SEPTA informing the Route 23 operators of this change. After the move, the route's PCC all-electric cars were replaced with pre-war PCC "air cars", which incorporated the use of pressurized air to power certain aspects of the car (such as sanders for traction) in order to provide greater reliability on Germantown Avenue's hills.

By this time, only two trolley lines operated from Luzerne Depot: routes 23 and 56. Along these last two routes, diesels buses were often substituted for months at a time, whenever utility construction occurred along those routes. Gone were the days when contractors were instructed to work around the streetcars. It was simply easier to suspend trolley service.

In a 1974 pamphlet, SEPTA presented route 23 as the world's longest trolley car route known to them.

=== Bus service ===
Trolley service had been bused off and on due to street and trolley track construction, but buses permanently replaced trolleys on February 27, 1992.

However, weekend streetcar service was restored on the Chestnut Hill portion of the route under the Chestnut Hill Trolley name. Service ran on Germantown Avenue from Westview Avenue to Bethlehem Pike from September 13, 1992 until June 15, 1996. In Center City, the Welcome Line trolley operated on 11th and 12th streets between Girard Avenue and Bainbridge Street in 1995, as well as the 1996 and 1997 holiday seasons. Since then, trolley service along the Route 23 has been non-existent.

In 2015, to make scheduling more manageable, the shorter and more densely-traveled southern segment of the route from Oregon Avenue to Market Street was separated and re-designated Route 45. Routes 23 and 45 make shared stops along 11th and 12th streets between Walnut and Callowhill streets, and SEPTA Key users can make a free transfer between the two routes for same-direction travel.

Route 23 utilizes several short-turn loops or cross-street cutbacks to allow for operational flexibility. Historically, those have been Germantown & Mermaid, Germantown & Gorgas (a large universal loop serving Germantown Depot), Germantown & Venango (later moved to Germantown & Ontario; both were the cutback to get to Luzerne Depot), 10th & Susquehanna, 12th & Bainbridge, and 12th & Snyder. The only currently-scheduled short-turn is Germantown Avenue and Ontario Street, which is the southern terminal for all late-night service.

== Future ==
All trackage on Germantown Avenue was replaced with new rail since 2008, while trackage on 11th and 12th streets remains with large portions paved over.

SEPTA announced plans in its 2010 Capital Budget to purchase new trolley cars and restore the rails between 2011 and 2018, allowing for the future return of streetcar service on the line. However, in 2011 it was pushed back to 2015–2022 and the proposed 2012 budget pushed it back even further to 2016–2023. The budgets do not include allocated funds to build a new trolley depot and maintenance facility.

In 2015, SEPTA proposed allocating $2 million on feasibility study to reinstate trolley service on Routes 23 and 56 in the latter part of its twelve-year capital program, between 2021 and 2027.
