= Summerset (disambiguation) =

Summerset may refer to:

== Places ==
- Summerset, South Dakota, a city in South Dakota
- Summerset at Frick Park, a residential development in Pittsburgh, Pennsylvania
- Lake Summerset, Illinois, a census-designated place in Illinois
- Summerset Township, Adair County, Iowa, a township in Iowa
- Summerset Trail, a rail trail in Iowa
- Winterset, Iowa, a city in Iowa which was originally to be named Summerset

== Other uses ==
- Summerset, an expansion pack for the video game The Elder Scrolls Online

== See also ==
- Somerset (disambiguation)
- Summerseat, a village in Greater Manchester, England
