= Lord Somerset =

"Lord Somerset" may refer to:

- Any of the Dukes of Somerset including the Earls of Somerset, notably:
  - Edward Seymour, 1st Duke of Somerset (c. 1500–1552), Lord Protector
- Viscount Somerset of the Irish peerage
- Male members of the families of the Dukes of Beaufort and the Earls and Marquesses of Worcester, notably:
  - Field Marshal FitzRoy Somerset, 1st Baron Raglan (1788–1855), soldier
  - General Lord Charles Somerset (1767–1831), soldier, politician and colonial administrator
  - General Lord Edward Somerset (1776–1842), soldier
  - Rt Hon Lord Arthur John Henry Somerset (1780–1816), politician
  - Lord Henry Somerset (1849–1932), politician and composer
  - Lord Arthur Somerset (1851–1926), soldier, linked with scandal
  - Lord Edward Somerset (1958–2024), and Lord John (Johnson) Somerset (born 1964), music producer, sons of David Somerset, 11th Duke of Beaufort
- Reginald Birchall, who used the name "Lord Somerset" in Canada
