= Tioga station =

Rapid transit station in Philadelphia

Tioga
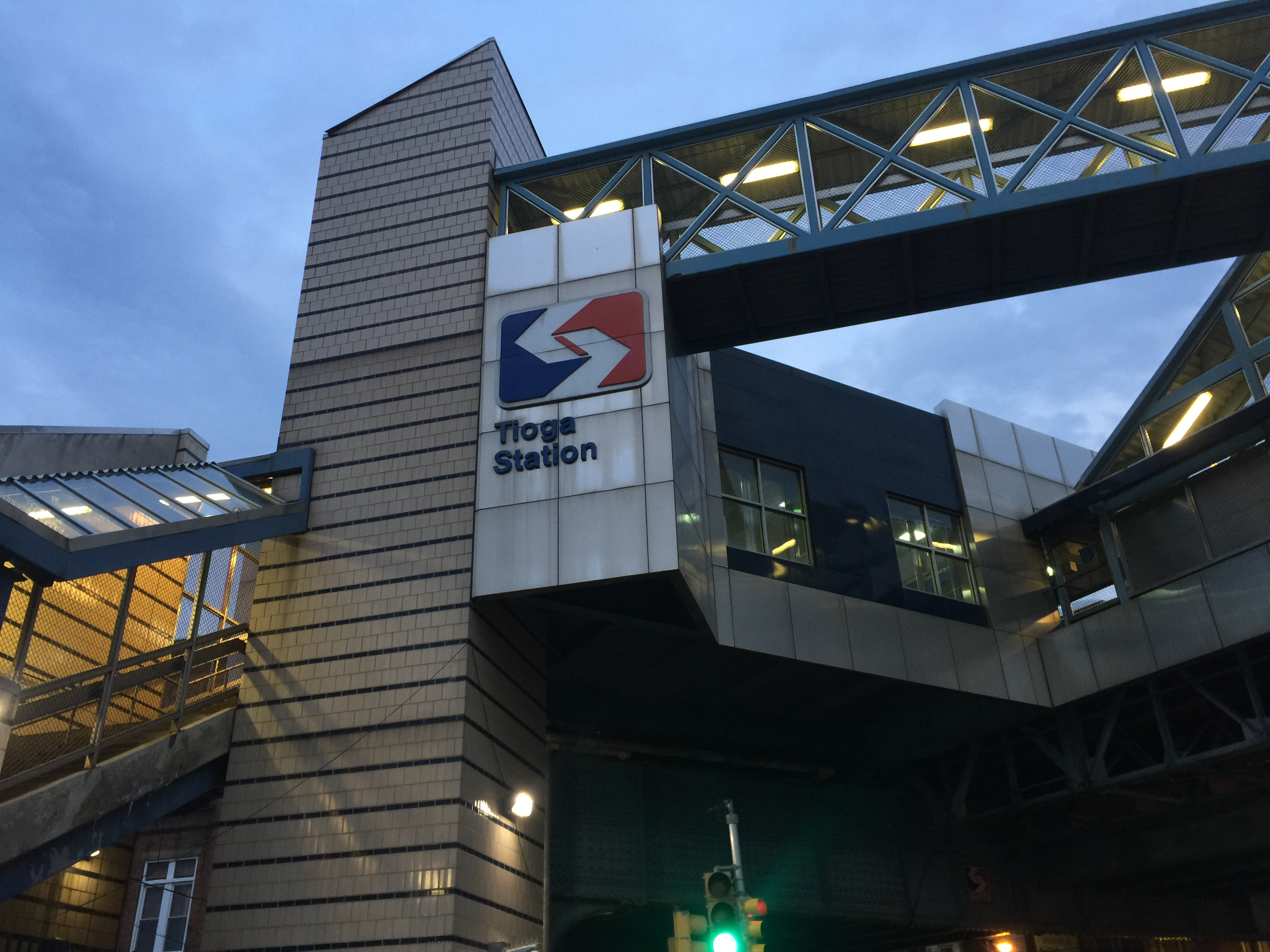
- Station exterior as viewed from Tioga Street

General information
- Location: 3500 Kensington Avenue; Philadelphia, Pennsylvania
- Coordinates: 40°00′01″N 75°06′23″W
- Owner: City of Philadelphia
- Operator: SEPTA
- Platforms: 2 side platforms
- Tracks: 2
- Connections: SEPTA City Bus: 3

Construction
- Structure type: Elevated
- Accessible: Yes

History
- Opened: November 5, 1922
- Rebuilt: 1997

Services
Preceding station	SEPTA Metro	Following station
Kensington–Allegheny toward 69th Street T.C.	L (SEPTA Metro)	Erie–Torresdale toward Frankford T.C.
Location

Tioga station is an elevated rapid transit station served by SEPTA Metro L trains in Philadelphia, Pennsylvania. It is located at the intersection of Kensington Avenue, Tioga Street, and K Street in the Harrowgate neighborhood of the city. The station is also served by SEPTA City Bus route 3.

== History ==
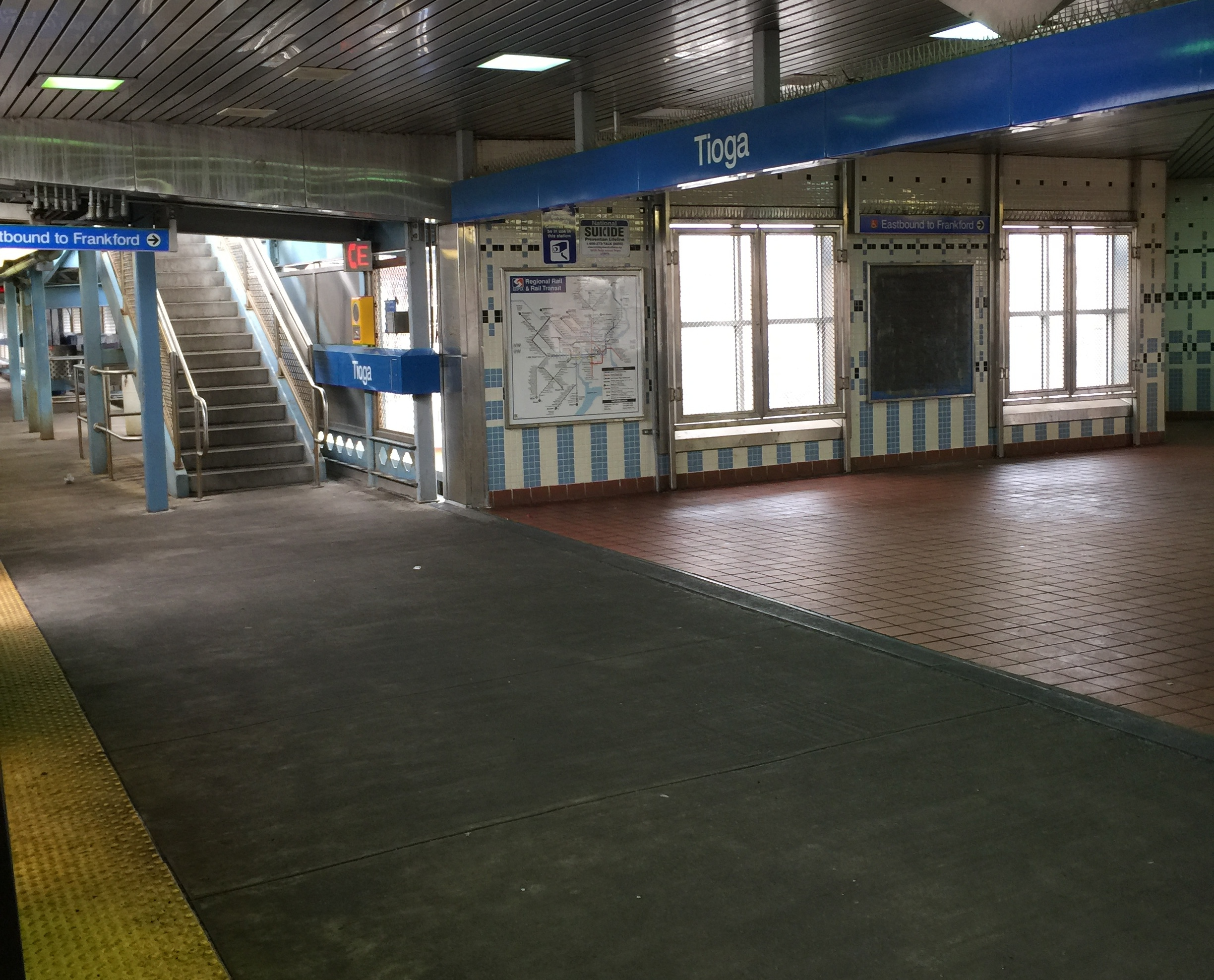
The station house is connected to the westbound platform

Tioga is part of the Frankford Elevated section of the line, which began service on November 5, 1922.

Between 1988 and 2003, SEPTA undertook a $493.3 million reconstruction of the 5.5-mile (8.9 km) Frankford Elevated. Most of Tioga station was completely rebuilt on the site of the original station, though the eastbound platform exit uses a component of the original station. The reconstruction project included new platforms, elevators, windscreens, and overpasses, and the station now meets ADA accessibility requirements. The line had originally been built with track ballast and was replaced with precast sections of deck, allowing the station (and the entire line) to remain open throughout the project.

During the Market–Frankford's rush-hour skip-stop service pattern, Tioga was only served by "A" trains. This practice was discontinued on February 24, 2020.

== Station layout ==
Access to the station from street level is west of the five-way intersection, situated between East Tioga Street and K Street. There is also an exit-only staircase from the eastbound platform to an area south of the intersection, situated between East Tioga Street and Kensington Avenue in Harrowgate Park.
