= SEPTA Route 53 =

Route 53
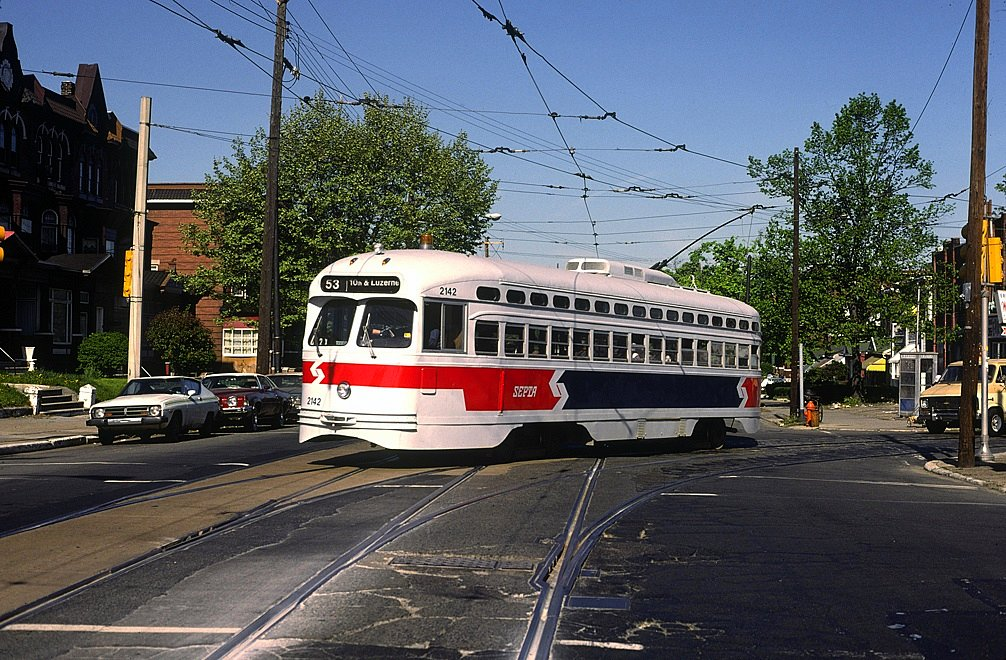
- A SEPTA Route 53 trolley turns from Pulaski Avenue to Erie Avenue in April 1985

Overview
- Garage: Luzerne Depot
- Began service: Pre-1890
- Ended service: 1985 (as a streetcar line)

Route
- Locale: Philadelphia
- Communities served: Mount Airy, Germantown, Hunting Park
- Start: Carpenter Woods Park
- Via: Wayne Avenue, Pulaski Avenue, Erie Avenue, 10th Street, Old York Road
- End: Hunting Park (BSL Station)
- Length: 7.1 miles (11.4 km)

Service
- Ridership: 766,500 (FY19)

Route 53 is a former streetcar line and current bus route, operated by the Southeastern Pennsylvania Transportation Authority (SEPTA) in Philadelphia, Pennsylvania, United States. The line runs between the West Mount Airy and Hunting Park neighborhoods primarily along Wayne Avenue.

== Route description ==
SEPTA Route 53 starts at Carpenter's Woods in West Mount Airy. It follows Wayne Avenue east through a residential area, crossing over the Chestnut Hill West Line, shortly before passing Tulpehocken (SEPTA station). The route continues to run fairly closely to the rail line until Chelten Avenue, where the rail line dips to the south.

The scenery becomes less residential as the route approaches Wayne Junction. After crossing under the railroad bridge by that station, the line turns south on Clarissa Street, crosses under the Roosevelt Expressway, and runs along the east side of SEPTA's Regional Rail Wayne Junction Yard before crossing West Hunting Park Avenue. At that point, the route continues on 18th Street, Pulaski Avenue, and 17th Street before turning left onto Erie Avenue, which carries SEPTA Route 56, another former street car converted into a bus route. (West-to-northbound buses use Pulaski Road all the way between Erie Avenue and 18th Street, as did the trolleys.) Both routes connect to Erie Station on the Broad Street Subway Line, as well as Germantown Avenue, which carries SEPTA Route 23. While SEPTA Route 56 continues northeast to the Torresdale-Cottman Loop in Tacony, Route 53 takes a left turn on 10th Street, and heads north towards the former Luzerne Depot, which became an all bus garage, and is now a cardboard recycling plant.

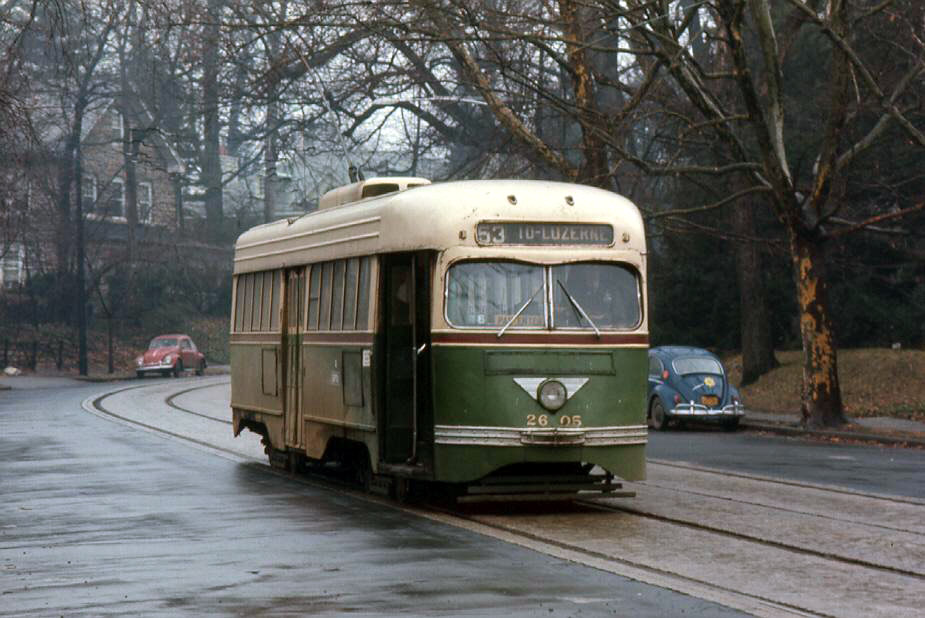
SEPTA PCC car #2605 on route 53 on Wayne Ave. at Upsal, January 31, 1969

A 2016 route change has certain buses continuing to the Hunting Park station on the Broad Street Line, as before, while others continue east along Hunting Park Avenue to G Street.

== History ==
SEPTA Route 53 was established as the Wayne Avenue Line sometime before 1890, and was expanded in 1904, 1929, and 1930. Route 53 was the first streetcar line in Philadelphia to receive PCC cars. On Sundays Routes 53 and 75 streetcar lines were operated as one route between Mt. Airy and Bridesburg. This consolidated service ended when the Route 75 was converted to trackless trolley operation in 1948.

Route 53 was "temporarily" converted to buses in June 1981 because of a bridge reconstruction project. SEPTA track inspectors then discovered misaligned rails on Wayne Avenue, and the bustitution was made permanent on May 16, 1985.

After the former Luzerne Depot was replaced by Midvale Depot, service was extended to Hunting Park (BSL station). Today, the northbound route passes Luzerne Street and makes a left turn at Lycoming Street, where it shortly encounters the southbound segment of the route on Old York Road onto which the northbound route makes a right turn, only to turn left at East Hunting Park Avenue, where it reaches Broad Street near the Hunting Park BSL station again. The line heads northeast along Roosevelt Boulevard, then turns on Bristol Street, only to head south on Old York Road again, until it reaches Luzerne Street, and makes another left on its way to the intersection with 10th Street.

As of 2008, all buses along this route are ADA-compliant, and contain bicycle racks. While SEPTA has considered restoring Route 56 line to light rail service, no such proposal exists for SEPTA Route 53.

On March 23, 2023, SEPTA released a new draft plan for Bus Revolution, SEPTA's bus network redesign. Under the plan, Route 53 would operate more frequently, be rerouted to serve Germantown station instead of Carpenter Woods, and be extended on its eastern end to the Richmond-Westmoreland Streets Loop. In the final plan, approved on May 23, 2024, the western terminal was changed to Carpenter station.
