= Somerset Mall =

Somerset Mall may refer to:

- Somerset Collection (formerly Somerset Mall), an upscale mall in Michigan, US
- Somerset Mall (South Africa), a large mall located in Somerset West in the Western Cape
