= Erie–Torresdale station =

Rapid transit station in Philadelphia

Erie–Torresdale
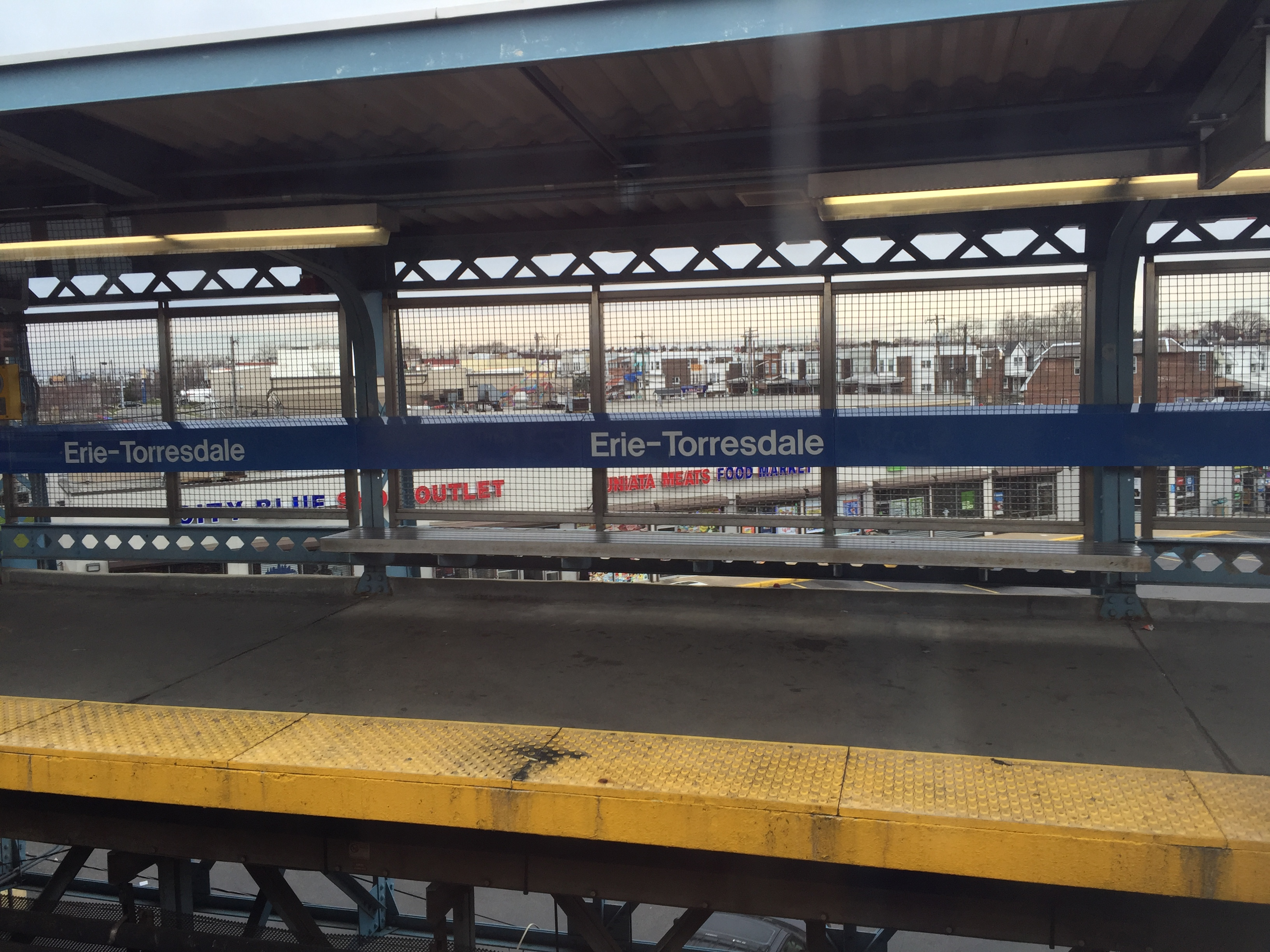
- Erie–Torresdale station platform

General information
- Location: 3900 Kensington Avenue; Philadelphia, Pennsylvania
- Coordinates: 40°00′22″N 75°05′46″W
- Owner: SEPTA
- Platforms: 2 side platforms
- Tracks: 2
- Connections: SEPTA City Bus: 3, 56

Construction
- Structure type: Elevated
- Accessible: Yes

History
- Opened: November 5, 1922
- Rebuilt: 1997
- Former names: Torresdale

Services
Preceding station	SEPTA Metro	Following station
Tioga toward 69th Street T.C.	L (SEPTA Metro)	Church toward Frankford T.C.
Location

Erie–Torresdale station is an elevated rapid transit station in Philadelphia, Pennsylvania, served by SEPTA Metro L trains. It is located at the intersection of Kensington, Erie, and Torresdale avenues in the Juniata neighborhood of Northeast Philadelphia. The station is also served by SEPTA City Bus routes 3 and 56, both of which are former trolley lines.

== History ==
Erie–Torresdale is part of the Frankford Elevated section of the line, which began service on November 5, 1922.

Between 1988 and 2003, SEPTA undertook a $493.3 million reconstruction of the 5.5-mile (8.9 km) Frankford Elevated. Erie–Torresdale station was completely rebuilt on the site of the original station; the project included new platforms, elevators, windscreens, and overpasses, and the station now meets ADA accessibility requirements. The line had originally been built with track ballast and was replaced with precast sections of deck, allowing the station (and the entire line) to remain open throughout the project.

== Station layout ==
The station building is located on the northwest corner of Kensington and Erie Avenues; Erie Avenue becomes Torresdale Avenue east of this intersection. There is also an exit-only staircase from the eastbound platform to southeast corner of the intersection.
