= Kensington–Allegheny station =

Rapid transit station in Philadelphia

Kensington–Allegheny
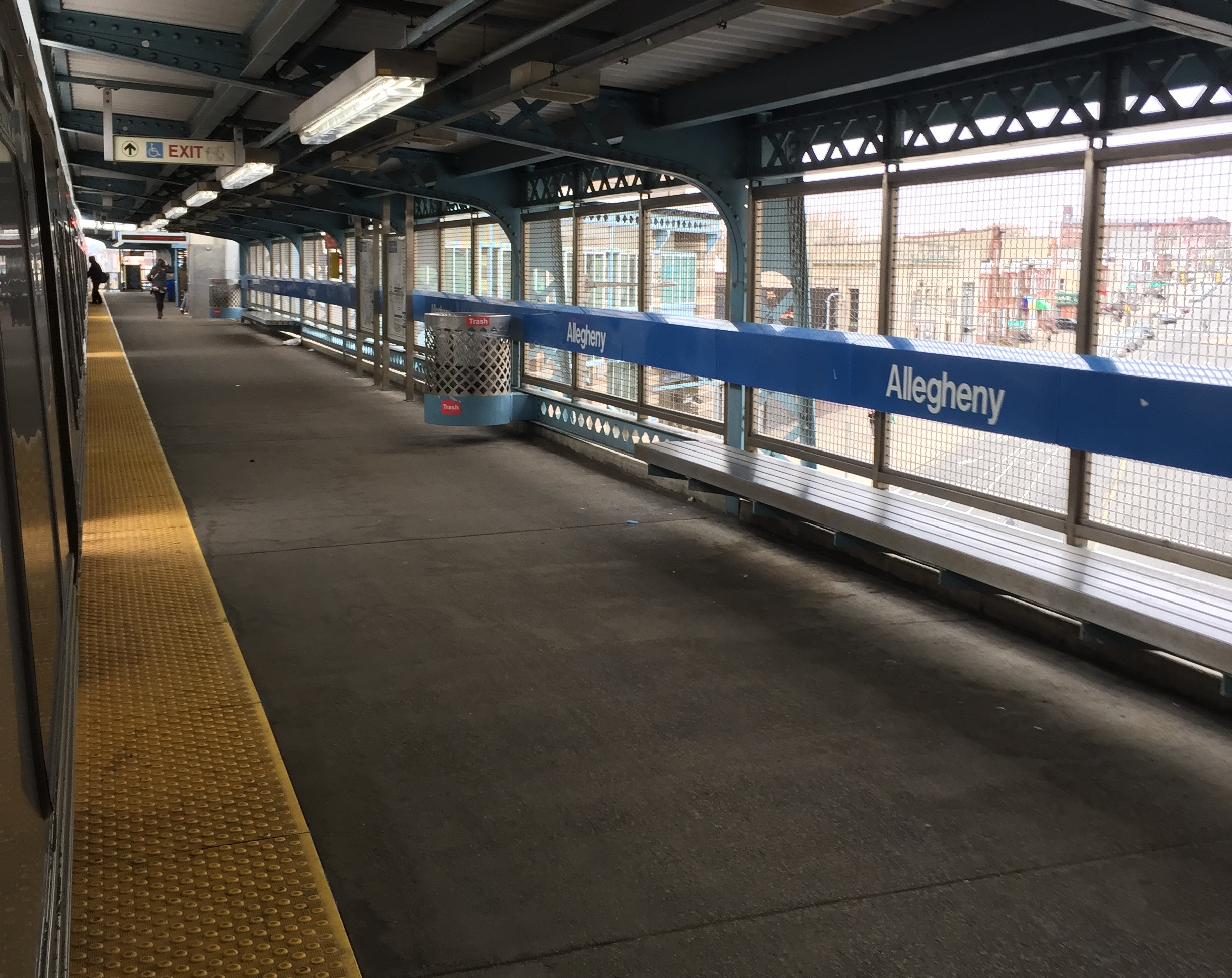

General information
- Location: 3200 Kensington Avenue; Philadelphia, Pennsylvania
- Coordinates: 39°59′47″N 75°06′49″W
- Owner: City of Philadelphia
- Operator: SEPTA
- Platforms: 2 side platforms
- Tracks: 2
- Connections: SEPTA City Bus: 3, 60

Construction
- Structure type: Elevated
- Accessible: Yes

History
- Opened: November 5, 1922
- Rebuilt: 1997
- Former names: Allegheny (1922–2025)

Services
Preceding station	SEPTA Metro	Following station
Somerset toward 69th Street T.C.	L (SEPTA Metro)	Tioga toward Frankford T.C.
Location

Kensington–Allegheny station is a rapid transit station served by SEPTA Metro L trains in Philadelphia, Pennsylvania. It is located at the intersection of Kensington and Allegheny avenues (known as "K&A") and H Street in the Kensington neighborhood of North Philadelphia. The station is also served by SEPTA City Bus routes 3 and 60.

== History ==
Kensington–Allegheny is part of the Frankford Elevated section of the line, which began service on November 5, 1922.

Between 1988 and 2003, SEPTA undertook a $493.3 million reconstruction of the 5.5-mile (8.9 km) Frankford Elevated. Allegheny station, as it was then known, was completely rebuilt on the site of the original station; the project included new platforms, elevators, windscreens, and overpasses, and the station now meets accessibility requirements. The line had originally been built with track ballast and was replaced with precast sections of deck, allowing the station (and the entire line) to remain open throughout the project.

In 2019, the Philadelphia Weekly magazine called the intersection "one of the most notorious drug corners" of the city; a controversial plan to build a supervised injection site near the station on Hilton Street was announced in March of that year.

== Station layout ==
Access to the station is via the southwest corner of Allegheny and Kensington avenues. There is also an eastbound platform exit-only stair to the northeast corner of the intersection.
