= Church station (SEPTA) =

Rapid transit station in Philadelphia

Church
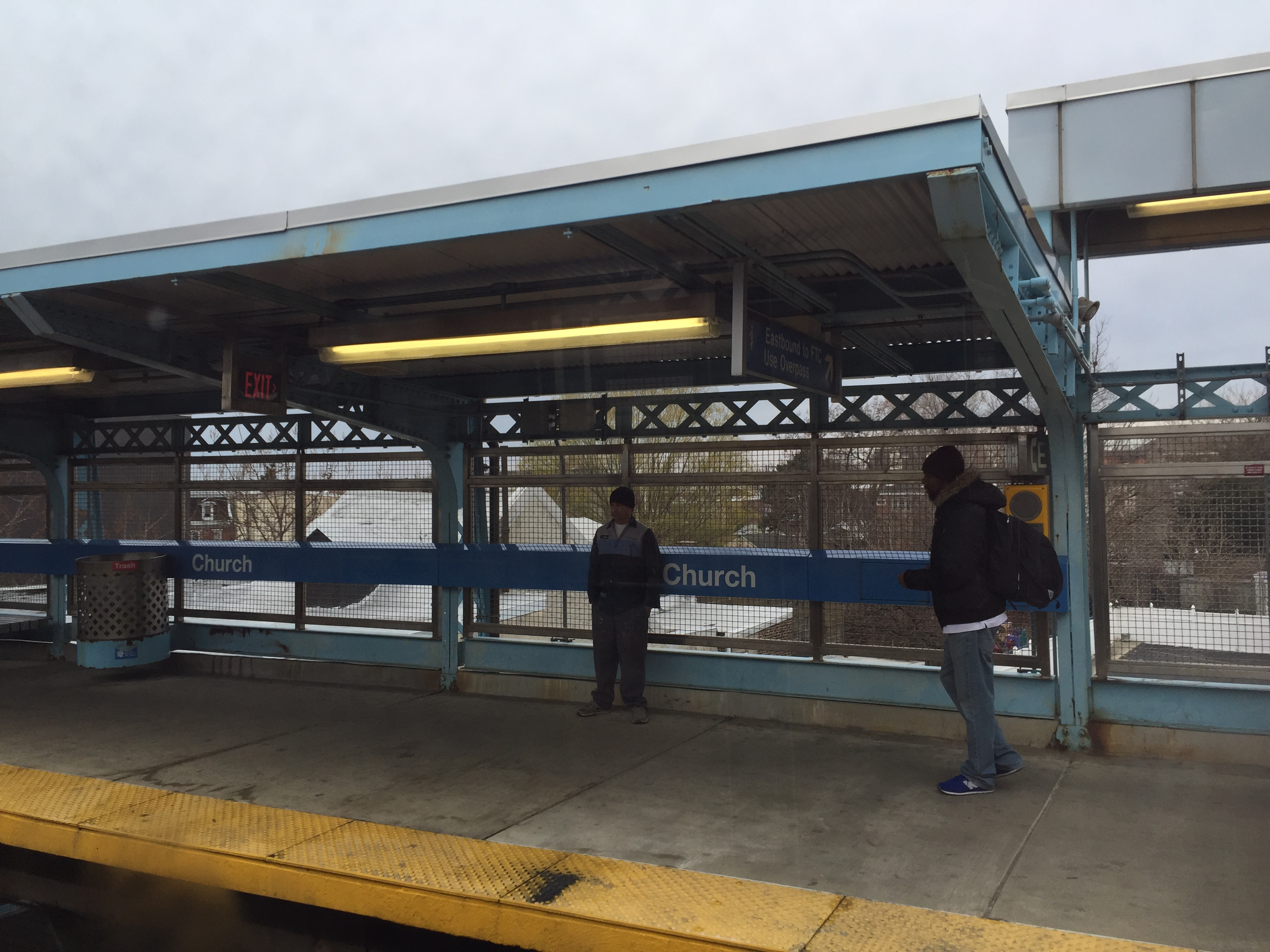
- Church station westbound platform

General information
- Location: 4300 North Frankford Avenue; Philadelphia, Pennsylvania
- Coordinates: 40°00′39″N 75°05′20″W
- Owner: SEPTA
- Platforms: 2 side platforms
- Tracks: 2
- Connections: SEPTA City Bus: 3, 5

Construction
- Structure type: Elevated
- Accessible: Yes

History
- Opened: November 5, 1922
- Rebuilt: 1997
- Former names: Ruan–Church

Services
Preceding station	SEPTA Metro	Following station
Erie–Torresdale toward 69th Street T.C.	L (SEPTA Metro)	Arrott T.C. toward Frankford T.C.
Location

Church station is an elevated rapid transit station in Philadelphia, Pennsylvania, served by SEPTA Metro L trains. It is located on Frankford Avenue between Ruan and Church streets in the Frankford neighborhood of Northeast Philadelphia. The station was originally named Ruan–Church station, and it is also served by SEPTA City Bus routes 3 and 5.

== History ==
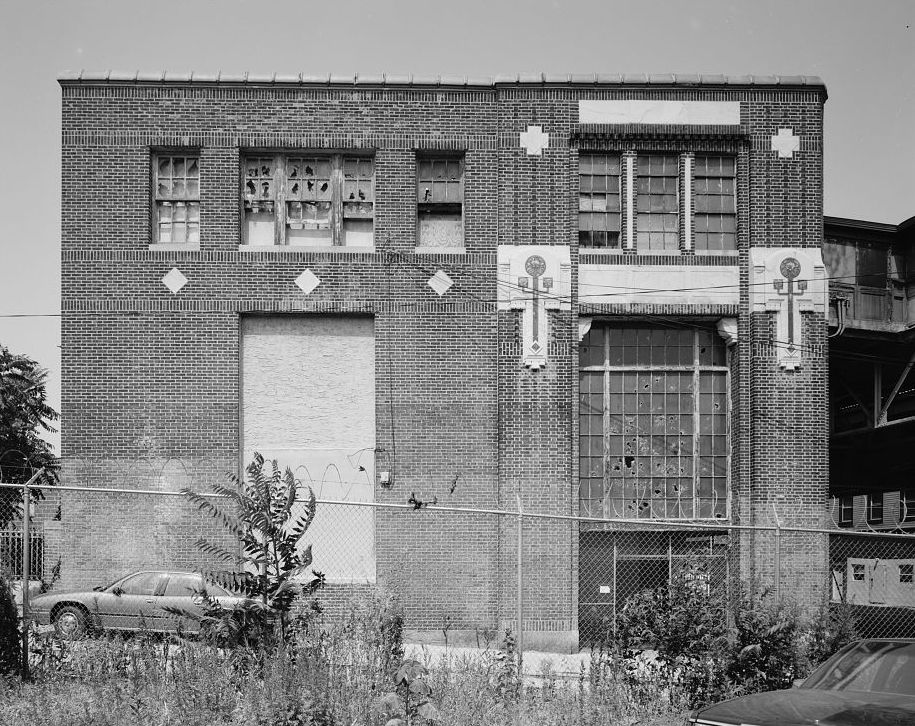
Church station c. 1968

Church is part of the Frankford Elevated section of the line, which began service on November 5, 1922, as Ruan–Church station.

Between 1988 and 2003, SEPTA undertook a $493.3 million reconstruction of the 5.5-mile (8.9 km) Frankford Elevated. Church station was completely rebuilt on the site of the original station; the project included new platforms, elevators, windscreens, and overpasses, and the station now meets ADA accessibility requirements. The line had originally been built with track ballast and was replaced with precast sections of deck, allowing the station (and the entire line) to remain open throughout the project.

During the Market–Frankford's rush-hour skip-stop service pattern, Church was only served by "B" trains. This practice was discontinued on February 24, 2020.

== Station layout ==
There are two staircases at the station, with the main entrance on the west side of Frankford Avenue between Ruan and Church streets. Across the street is an eastbound platform exit-only staircase. South of the station, the tracks turn west to travel along Kensington Avenue.
