= Somerset Hospital =

Somerset Hospital may refer to:

- Somerset Hospital (Cape Town), a public hospital in Cape Town, South Africa
- Somerset Hospital (Pennsylvania), a hospital in Somerset, Pennsylvania, United States
- Somerset Hospital, almshouses in Froxfield, Wiltshire, England
- Somerset Medical Center in Somerville, New Jersey, now Robert Wood Johnson University Hospital Somerset, originally known as Somerset Hospital
