= SEPTA Route 56 =

Route 56
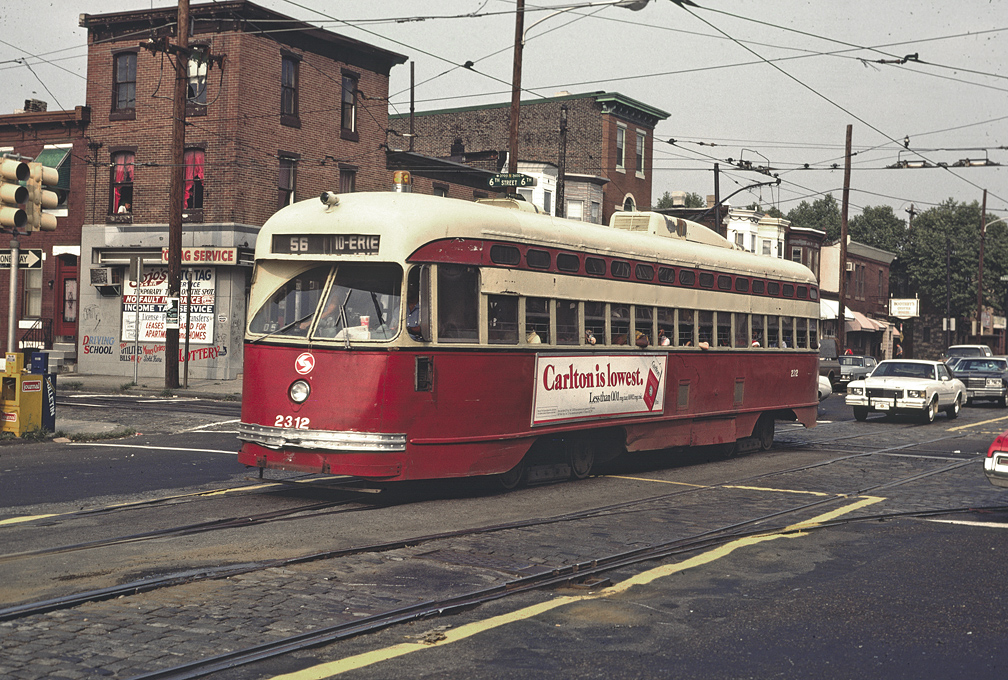
- An ex-Toronto trolley crossing 6th Street in 1980

Overview
- Operator: Southeastern Pennsylvania Transportation Authority
- Began service: 1907 (streetcar line); 1992 (bus service)
- Ended service: 1992 (as a streetcar line)

Route
- Locale: Philadelphia
- Communities served: Nicetown, Hunting Park, Juniata Park, Frankford, Tacony
- Start: Venango Loop
- Via: Erie Avenue, Torresdale Avenue
- End: Torresdale-Cottman Loop
- Length: 7.9 miles (12.7 km)

Service
- Journey time: 45 minutes
- Ridership: 3,008,278 (FY19)

Route 56, the Erie and Torresdale Avenues Line, is a former streetcar line and current bus route. It is operated by the Southeastern Pennsylvania Transportation Authority (SEPTA) in Philadelphia, Pennsylvania, United States. The line runs between the Tioga and Tacony neighborhoods primarily along Erie Avenue and Torresdale Avenue. Route 56 was one of three "suspended" by the SEPTA board effective June 12, 1992. The two others, Routes 15 and 23, were then also operated by buses as of the same year; however, the Route 15 Trolley has since been restored back to trolley as of September 5, 2005.

== Route description ==
Route 56 begins at West Hunting Park Avenue and 23rd Street, better known as the Venango Street Loop. Five blocks later at Pulaski Avenue, SEPTA Route 53 joins Route 56 along Erie Avenue. Route 53 is another former streetcar line that was converted into a bus route. Both routes intersect with Broad Street and connect to Erie Station on the Broad Street Subway Line, as well as Germantown Avenue, which carries Route 23. Route 53 leaves Erie Avenue at 10th Street turning north toward Luzerne Carhouse, while Route 56 continues towards its eastbound destination. Route 53's original terminus was the Luzerne Carhouse, which was shared by Route 56 for storage. East of Sedgley Avenue near 2nd Street, Route 56 runs parallel to the Trenton Line on the line's north side. The east corners of the intersection of Front Street, contain sites such as St. Christopher's Hospital and a local ball park known as Lighthouse Field.

When Route 56 meets Erie-Torresdale Station at Kensington Avenue in Juniata Park, Erie Avenue turns into Torresdale Avenue. The station is an elevated section of the Market-Frankford Line above Kensington Avenue. East of the station, a loop for Route 56 exists on the south side of the intersections of East Hunting Park Avenue and Frankford Avenue, which includes bridges over Tacony Creek for Torresdale and Frankford Avenues. While most of Erie Avenue and Torresdale Avenue between Kensington and Frankford Avenues contain visible signs of the former streetcar line within the pavement, east of this loop few remnants of the former trolley line remain.

South of the line, Bridge Street and Harbison Avenue both lead to Bridesburg (SEPTA station) and I-95, although Harbison Avenue is better able to handle the traffic. Robbins and Levick Streets lead to and from the Tacony-Palmyra Bridge as do two streets at the terminus of the line. Disston Street is an otherwise non-notable residential street that leads to Tacony (SEPTA station). Prior to the line's eastern terminus, Torresdale Avenue becomes part of eastbound PA 73, which turns onto southbound Princeton Avenue on its way to I-95 and the Tacony-Palmyra Bridge. The line finally ends at the Torresdale-Cottman Loop, on the corner of Torresdale and Cottman Avenues, where the eastbound and westbound sections of PA 73 merge.

== History ==
Route 56 was established in 1907 and originally ran from the intersection of West Hunting Park Avenue and Pulaski Avenue then down Pulaski to Erie where it ended at 2nd Street. As with all trolleys in Philadelphia, its rail gauge was 5 ft 2 1/4 in (1,581 mm). In 1926, the western terminus was moved to its present location; in 1928, the eastern terminus was moved northeast to the Torresdale-Cottman Loop.

In March 1941, the line was re-equipped with PCC cars, which provided all trolley service until 1992.

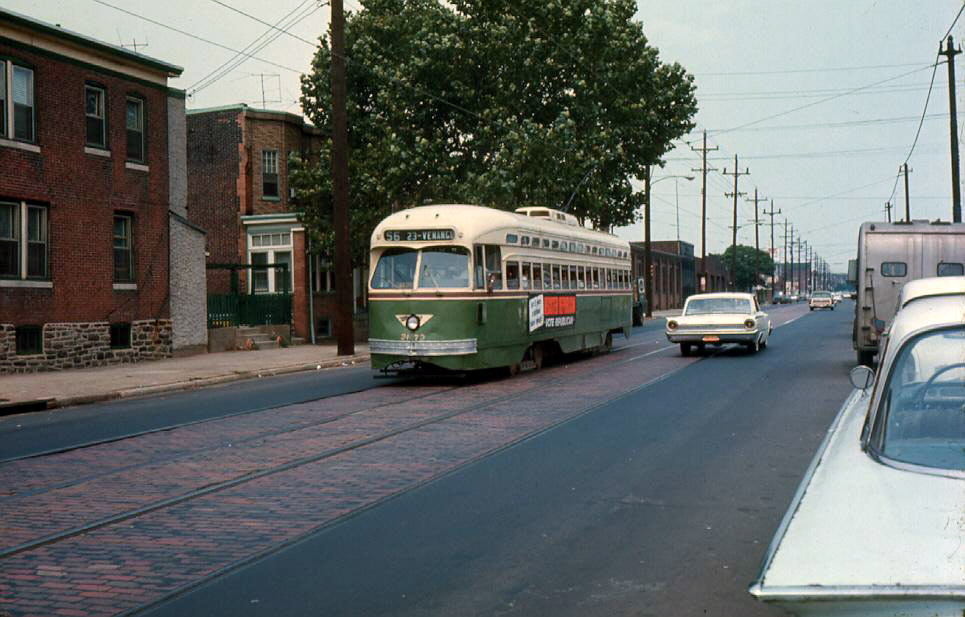
Southbound Route 56 PCC car on Torresdale Avenue in July 1968

In the 1970s, trolley operation on route 56 was suspended for almost five years (with buses serving the route), from late 1975 – as a result of a fire at Woodland Carhouse in October 1975 – until June 1980.

Route 56 was suspended as a trolley in 1992, and replaced by bus service, along with Route 23. During 1994, fan trips were provided by Brill Built #8534 & Kawasaki LRV #9111 trolleys, revealing dedicated lanes on Erie, such as the right-of-way on Toronto's 512 St. Clair line. In 1997, SEPTA attempted to make this suspension permanent, but cancelled the proposal after public outcry from commuters. As of 2009, all buses are compliant with the Americans with Disabilities Act of 1990, and contain bicycle racks. "Night Owl" service is also available. In 2014, SEPTA general manager Joe Casey stated in an interview that there are currently no plans to restore trolley routes 23 and 56 due to the need to address SEPTA's backlog of deferred State of Good Repair projects for the system. However, SEPTA's Subway-Surface Trolley replacement project will include studying the possibility of restoring route 56 as well as routes 23 and 45 to light rail.
