= Nearside streetcar =

Tram designed by Thomas E. Mitten

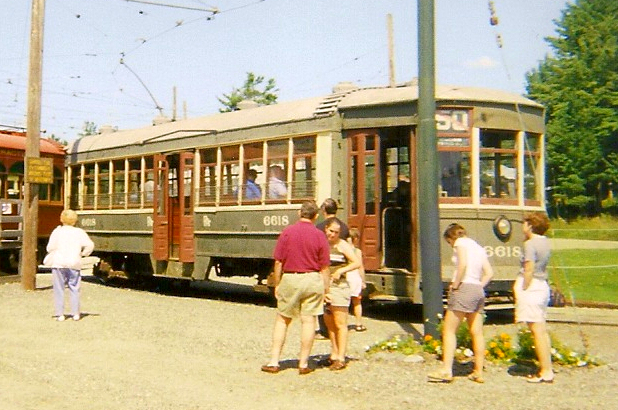
Nearside car 6618 at the Seashore Trolley Museum in Kennebunkport, ME

The Nearside (or Near-side) Car was a streetcar (trolley car or tram) designed by in-house engineers of the Thomas E. Mitten management team, which ran the Philadelphia Rapid Transit Company (PRT). Nearside refers to the fact the car would pick up and discharge passengers on the “nearside” of an intersection rather than the “farside” as the previous generation of “conventional” cars did (this method of operation caused frequent gridlock, as the stopped cars blocked cross traffic). The 1,500 cars that the PRT ordered from the J. G. Brill Company in South Philadelphia was the largest single order of streetcars in North American history. The cars were initially designed as “muzzle loaders” with only double front doors for passenger entry and exit. Later, most of the fleet would have center exit doors cut into them making them Peter Witt cars. The cars were in service in Philadelphia from 1911 to 1955, when they were scrapped in favor of the more modern PCC streetcar. Nearside cars were also purchased by the International Railway Company of Buffalo, NY and in Chicago by the Chicago Surface Lines, both properties were also managed by Mitten.

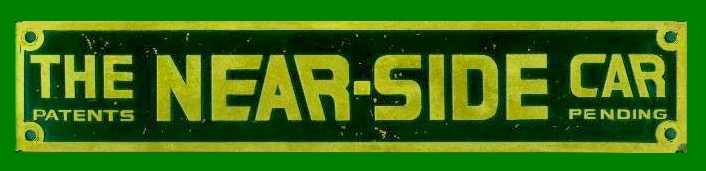
A Brill Co. builder's plate for a Near-side car
