= Somerset, Lunenburg County, Nova Scotia =

Locality in Nova Scotia, Canada

Coordinates: 44°14′3″N 64°32′8″W

Somerset in Nova Scotia

Somerset is a locality in the Canadian province of Nova Scotia, located in the Municipality of the District of Lunenburg.
