= Somerset station (SEPTA) =

Rapid transit station in Philadelphia

Somerset
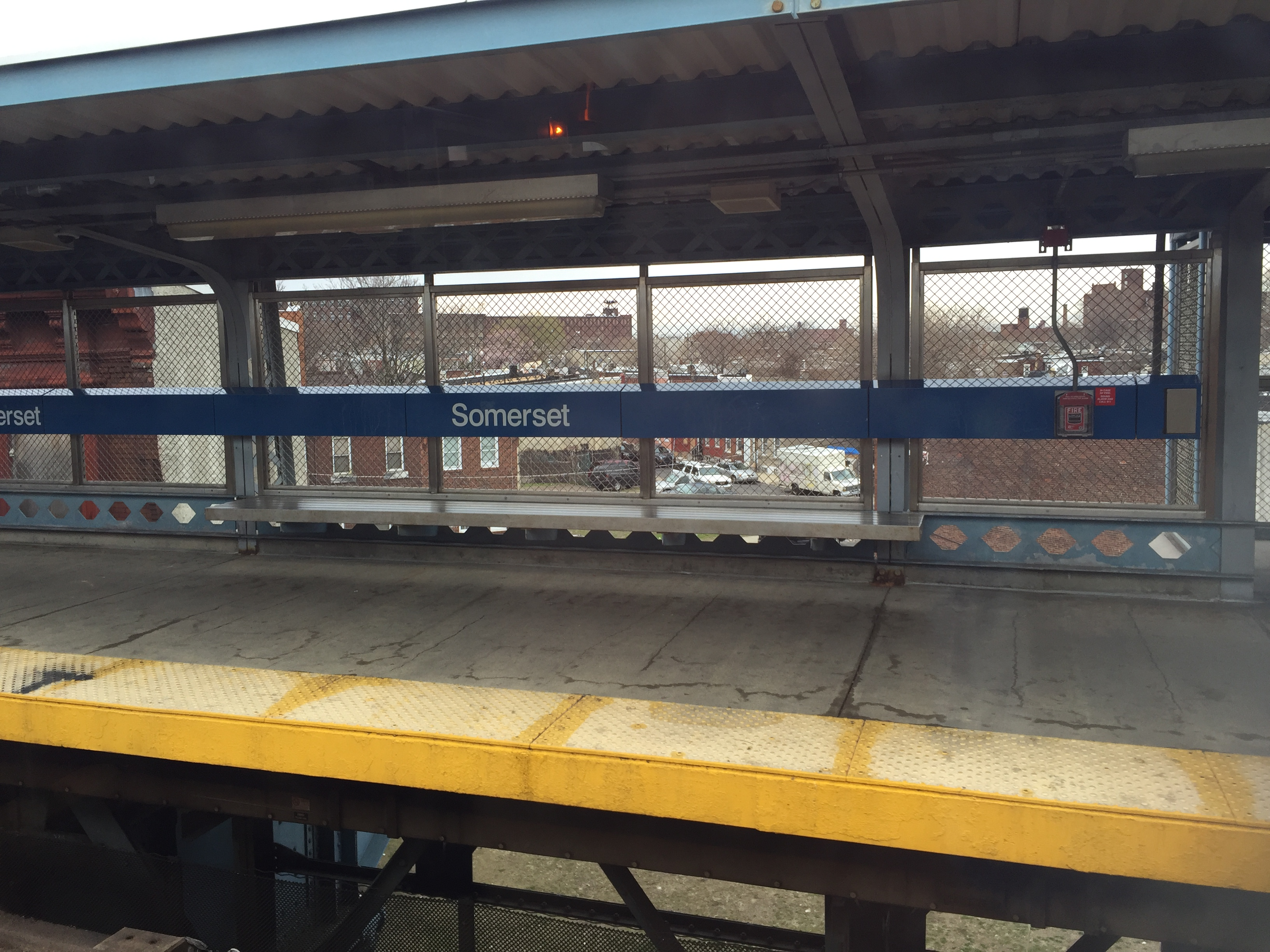
- Somerset station platform

General information
- Location: 2800 Kensington Avenue; Philadelphia, Pennsylvania, U.S.
- Coordinates: 39°59′30″N 75°07′20″W
- Owner: City of Philadelphia
- Operator: SEPTA
- Platforms: 2 side platforms
- Tracks: 2
- Connections: SEPTA City Bus: 3, 54, 76

Construction
- Structure type: Elevated
- Accessible: Yes

History
- Opened: November 5, 1922
- Rebuilt: 1997

Services
Preceding station	SEPTA Metro	Following station
Huntingdon toward 69th Street T.C.	L (SEPTA Metro)	Kensington–Allegheny toward Frankford T.C.
Location

Somerset station is an elevated rapid transit station served by SEPTA Metro L trains, located at the intersection of Somerset Street, D Street, and Kensington Avenue in the Kensington neighborhood of Philadelphia, Pennsylvania. The station is also served by SEPTA City Bus routes 3, 54, and 76.

== History ==
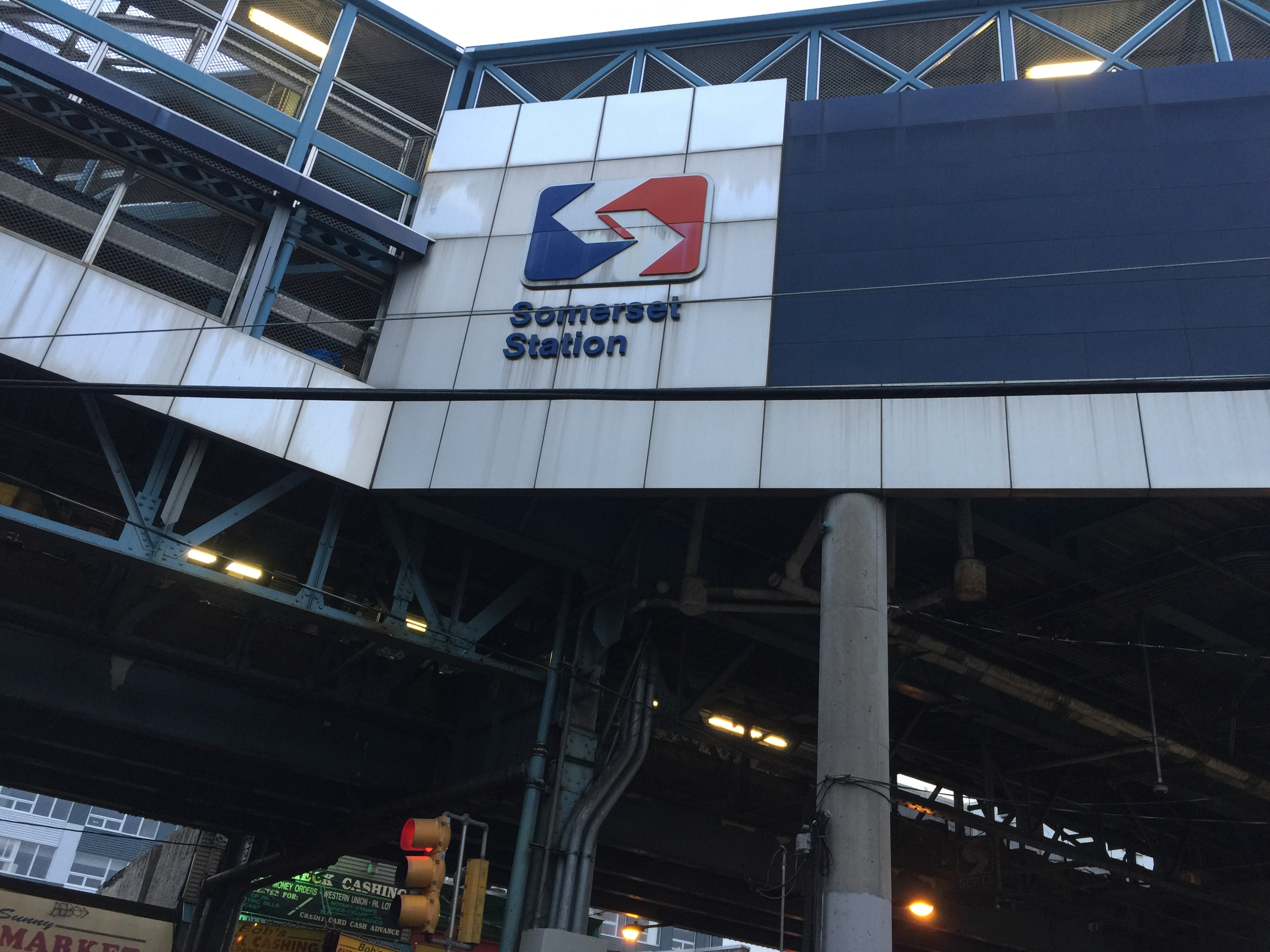
Station exterior as seen from Somerset Street

Somerset is part of the Frankford Elevated section of the line, which began service on November 5, 1922.

Between 1988 and 2003, SEPTA undertook a $493.3 million reconstruction of the 5.5-mile (8.9 km) Frankford Elevated. Somerset station was completely rebuilt on the site of the original station; the project included new platforms, elevators, windscreens, and overpasses, and the station now meets ADA accessibility requirements. The line had originally been built with track ballast and was replaced with precast sections of deck, allowing the station (and the entire line) to remain open throughout the project.

In 2007, Philadelphia Weekly named intersection underneath the station as one of the top ten "drug corners" in the city.

During the Market–Frankford's rush-hour skip-stop service pattern, Somerset was only served by "B" trains. This practice was discontinued on February 24, 2020.

On March 21, 2021, Somerset station temporarily closed due to safety concerns. The station was closed so SEPTA could clean the station and repair elevators. The station experiences high drug use from patrons, with several people falling onto the tracks and the elevators broken because of human waste and needles. Somerset station reopened on April 5, 2021, and will have additional SEPTA Transit Police presence.

== Station layout ==
Access to the station is at the southwest corner of Somerset Street and Kensington Avenue. There is also an exit-only staircase from the eastbound platform at the southeast corner of the intersection. West of the station, the tracks traverse a truss bridge over a Conrail freight line.
