= 22nd Street station (SEPTA) =

Underground trolley station in Philadelphia, Pennsylvania

22nd St
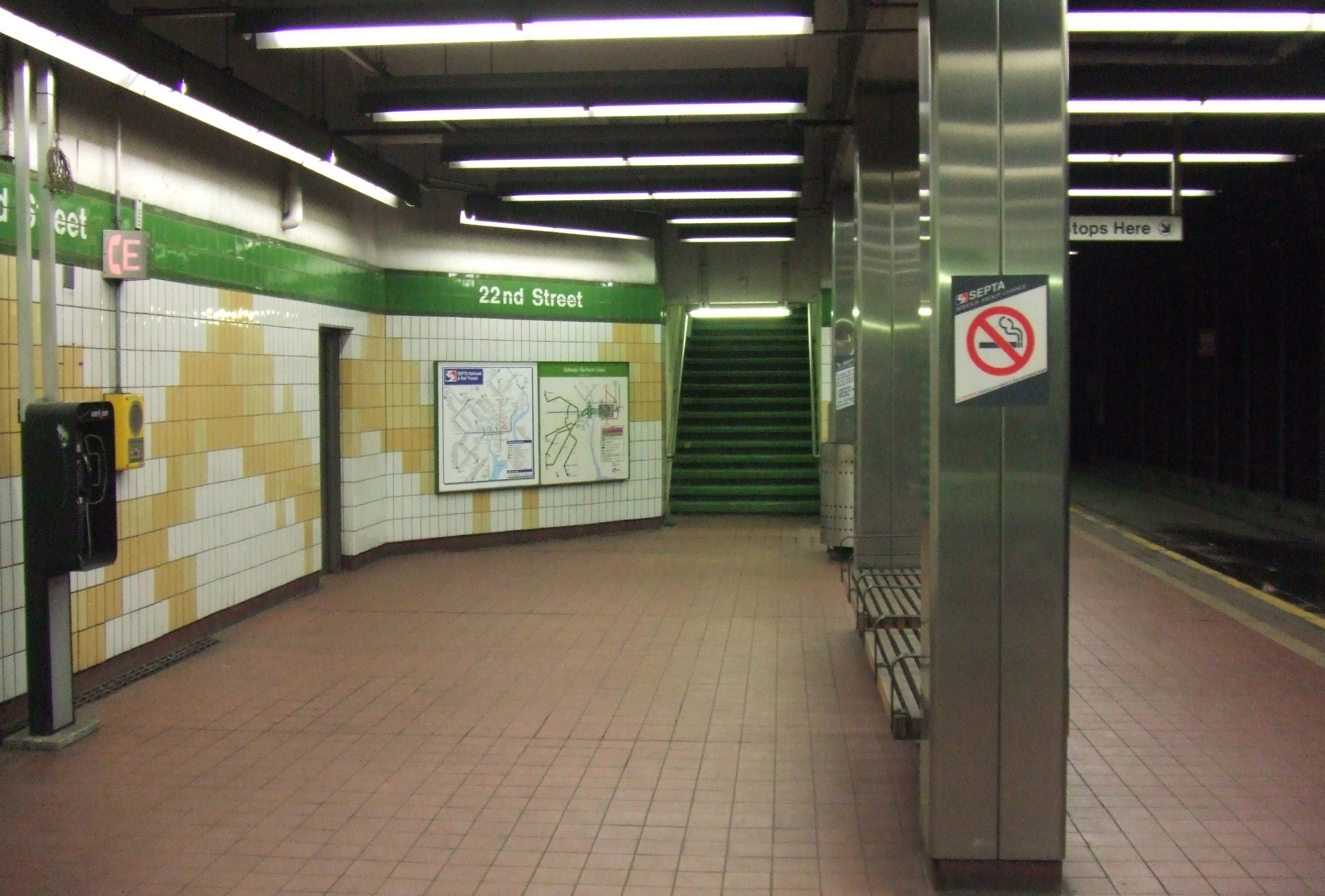
- 22nd Street station platform

General information
- Location: 22nd and Market streets Philadelphia, Pennsylvania
- Coordinates: 39°57′15″N 75°10′35″W
- Owner: SEPTA
- Platforms: 2 side platforms
- Tracks: 4
- Connections: SEPTA City Bus: 7, 44; SEPTA Suburban Bus: 124, 125

Construction
- Structure type: Underground
- Accessible: No, planned 1

History
- Opened: October 15, 1955
Services
Preceding station	SEPTA Metro	Following station
Drexel Station at 30th Street toward 63rd–Malvern/Overbrook	T1 (SEPTA Metro)	19th Street toward 13th Street
Drexel Station at 30th Street toward 61st–Baltimore/Angora	T2 (SEPTA Metro)	19th Street toward 13th Street
Drexel Station at 30th Street toward Yeadon or Darby T.C.	T3 (SEPTA Metro)	19th Street toward 13th Street
Drexel Station at 30th Street toward Darby T.C.	T4 (SEPTA Metro)	19th Street toward 13th Street
Drexel Station at 30th Street toward 80th Street/Eastwick	T5 (SEPTA Metro)	19th Street toward 13th Street
does not stop here
Former services (at 24th Street)
Preceding station	Philadelphia Transportation Company	Following station
30th Street toward 69th Street	Market Elevated	19th Street toward Frankford
Location

22nd Street station is an underground trolley station in Center City, Philadelphia that serves all lines of the SEPTA Metro T. Similar to 19th Street station, three blocks east of it, the station has two side platforms and a total of four tracks. The station serves only subway–surface trolleys on the two outer tracks; the Market-Frankford Line subway uses the two inner tracks and bypasses the station as it travels between 15th Street and 30th Street station.

The station was constructed by the Philadelphia Transportation Company in 1955, a replacement for the nearby 24th Street station just north of Market Street at the east end of the now-removed shared train and trolley bridge over the Schuylkill River. The former station site is now the Crown Lights Building (a tall rectangular black skyscraper topped with four large LED message boards atop its upper sides), the headquarters of PECO Energy.

== History ==
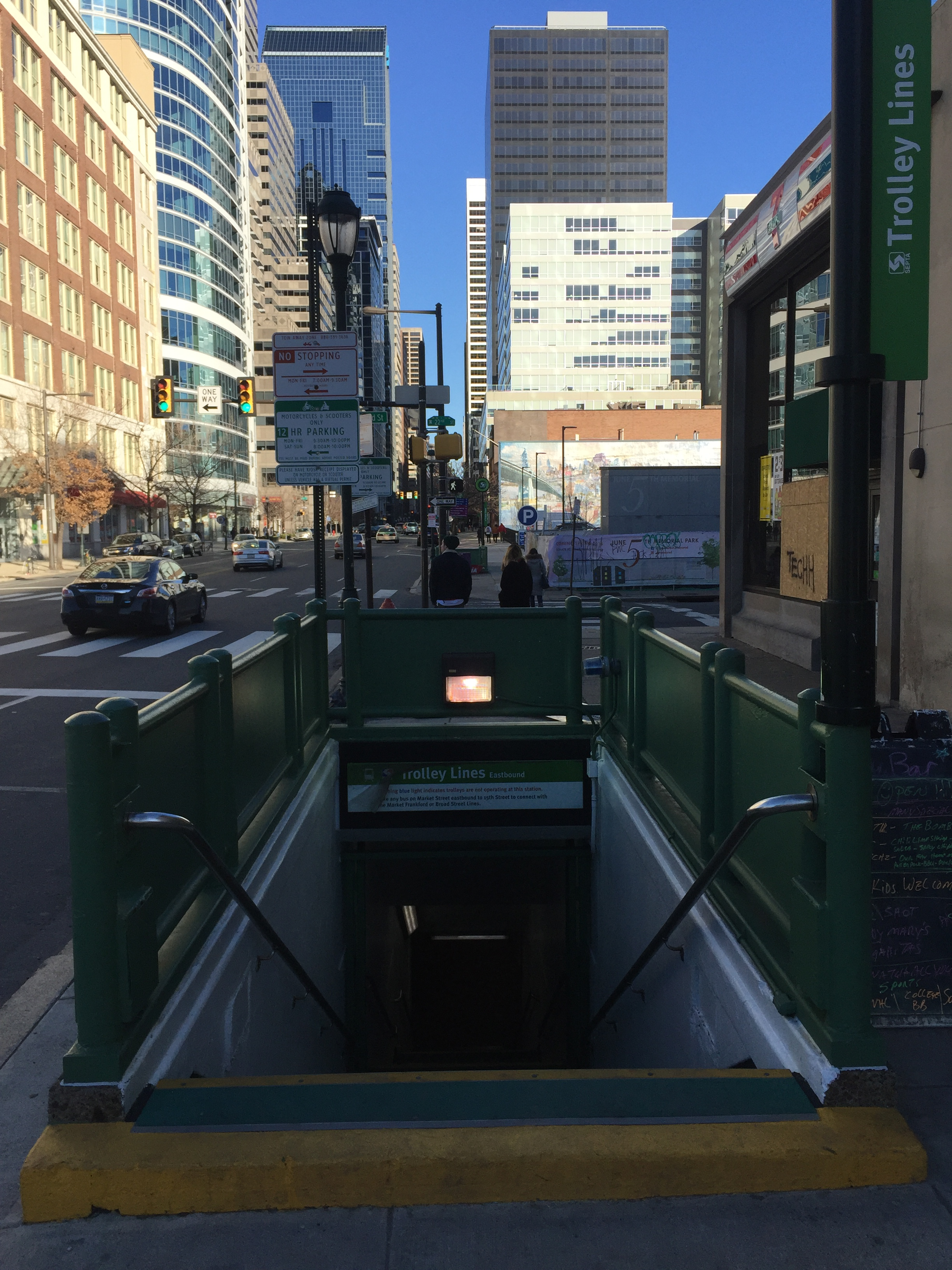
Eastbound platform entrance with the site of the 2013 Philadelphia building collapse in the background.

22nd Street station was opened October 15, 1955 by the Philadelphia Transportation Company (PTC), built to replace the elevated 24th Street station that was opened in 1905 by the Philadelphia Rapid Transit Company (PRT) and for the first two years formed part of a subway–surface trolley loop operating underground between 15th Street and the Schuylkill River.

In 1907, the Philadelphia Rapid Transit Company (PRT) completed the Market Street subway–elevated line from 15th Street to 69th Street. It featured a bridge – located north of Market Street and south of Filbert Street – that carried both the subway and subway–surface lines over the Schuylkill River. The PRT bridge connected surface trolley lines in West Philadelphia to the underground subway–surface loop in Center City. The station at 24th Street was constructed of wood and built atop an embankment. It was the only subway–surface station not physically underground and was located one block from the Philadelphia station of the Baltimore & Ohio Railroad, which served B&O tracks running north-south along the east bank of the Schuylkill.

The PRT announced a project to bury the elevated tracks between 23rd to 46th streets in the 1920s. The tunnel from 23rd to 32nd streets was completed by 1933, but construction on the remaining segment was put on hiatus due to the Great Depression and World War II. The PRT went bankrupt in 1939, and was reorganized as the PTC, which began building the rest of the tunnel in 1947.

The tunnel opened for service on October 15, 1955, marking the closure of the eastbound elevated station and the opening of the current underground station. The following month, on November 6, the westbound side elevated station closed. The PRT bridge that formerly had carried subway cars and subway–surface trolleys over the river was torn down by June 20, 1956. Nothing remains of the 24th Street station. Instead, the PECO Building, headquarters of PECO Energy division of Exelon, now occupies the site.

The station originally served Routes 10, 11, 31, 34, 37 and 38. Route 31 was rerouted out of the tunnel in 1949 and buses replaced trolleys on routes 37 and 38 in 1955. Routes 13 and 36 began serving the station (and the subway–surface tunnel) in 1956.

== Station layout ==
The station has two low-level side platforms, each capable of platforming two trolleys. There are SEPTA Key turnstiles on the westbound platform for fare collection, enabling all-door boarding and reducing the time required for fare collection. Fares must still be paid at the on-board farebox in the eastbound direction.
