= T4 (SEPTA) =

Light rail line in Philadelphia, Pennsylvania

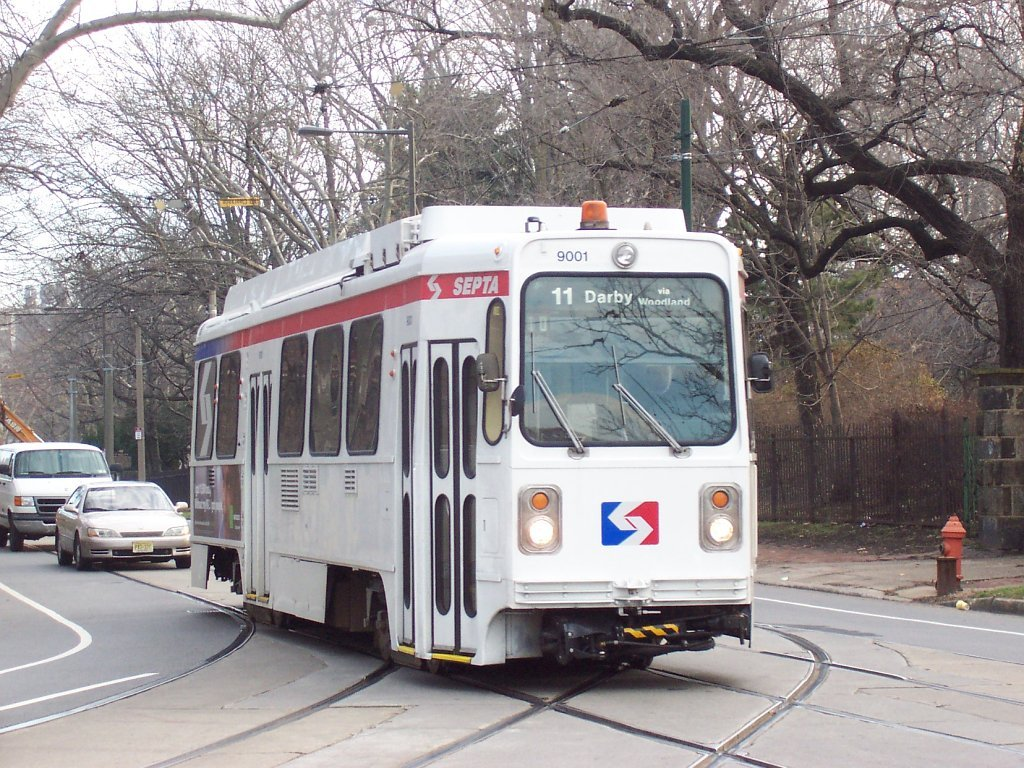
- A trolley bound for Darby Transit Center in 2006

Overview
- Termini: 13th Street; Darby Transit Center
- Stations: 8 underground stations, 1 surface level station, and 39 street-level stops

Service
- Type: Trolley
- System: SEPTA Metro
- Depot: Elmwood Carhouse
- Daily ridership: 13,480 (avg weekday 2019)

History
- Opened: 1858

Technical
- Line length: 13.3 mi (21.4 km)
- Track gauge: 5 ft 2 1/4 in (1,581 mm) Pennsylvania trolley gauge
- Electrification: Overhead line, 600 V DC
Route map
Template:T4 (SEPTA)

The T4, formerly Route 11, is a trolley line operated by the Southeastern Pennsylvania Transportation Authority (SEPTA) that connects the 13th Street station in Center City, Philadelphia, to Darby Transit Center in Darby, Pennsylvania. It is one of five T services of the SEPTA Metro. Sitting at an average of 13,580 riders per weekday in 2019, it is the most used T service.

== Route description ==
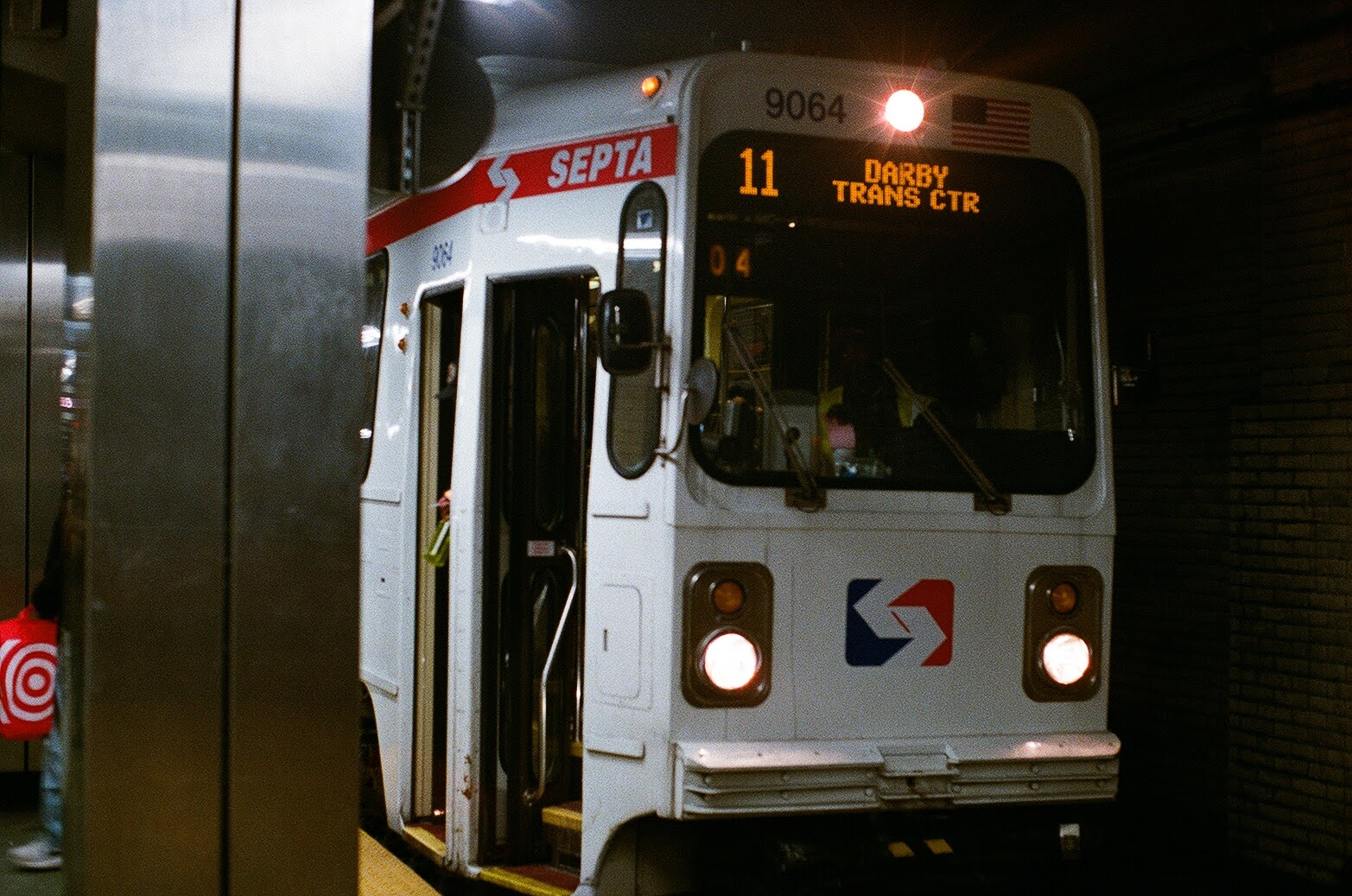
A SEPTA 11/T4 trolley arrives at 15th St Station

Starting from its eastern end at 13th Street, the T4 runs in a tunnel under Market Street. It stops at underground stations at 15th Street/City Hall, 19th Street, 22nd Street, Drexel Station at 30th Street, and 33rd Street. From 15th to 30th Streets, it runs on the outer tracks of Market Street subway, beside the L.

Passengers may transfer free of charge to the L at 13th Street, 15th Street/City Hall, and Drexel Station at 30th Street and to the B at 15th Street/City Hall. Connections to SEPTA Regional Rail are also available. Underground passageways connect the 13th and 15th Street/City Hall stations to Jefferson Station and Suburban Station.

The T4 surfaces at the 40th Street Portal near 40th Street and Baltimore Avenue (US 13), and then runs southwest along Woodland Avenue, along with the T5. At 49th Street, the T5 splits and heads south. The T4 continues its run along Woodland Avenue. The line runs parallel to the north side of the Wilmington/Newark Line and crosses a bridge over CSX's Philadelphia Subdivision freight line, at 60th Street.

At the intersection of Island Road and the Cobbs Creek Parkway, a track runs southward toward 73rd–Elmwood station on the corner of Elmwood Avenue. The T4 moves northwest from Woodland Avenue to Main Street as it crosses the Cobbs Creek and enters Darby. Here, the T4 crosses the Philadelphia Subdivision again, but at an at-grade crossing along with 6th Street. The road and line move to the west shortly, only to turn back northwest and finally north to 9th Street at the Darby Transit Center.

== History ==
What is now the T4 was first established as the West Philadelphia Passenger Railway Company in Darby on December 24, 1858, and ran as horsecars from 9th and Main Streets in Darby to 49th Street and Woodland Avenue in West Philadelphia. It was originally a segregated streetcar that required African-Americans to ride on platforms along with the driver, until abolitionist William Still challenged that rule between 1859 and 1867. Electrification was completed in 1894, and in 1896, the line was extended as far east as Front Street via Chestnut and Walnut Streets. It was integrated into the subway–surface trolley system by the Philadelphia Rapid Transit Company on December 15, 1906. The original numbered designation was "Route 11".

The at-grade crossing along Main Street at the intersection of Sixth Street in Darby was the site of the Darby Baltimore and Ohio Railroad station. B&O had passenger service into Philadelphia until 1958.

On December 9, 2021, a T4 LRV collided with a CSX Transportation freight train operating on the Philadelphia Subdivision at the at-grade crossing between the two lines near the intersection of Main Street and Sixth Street in Darby. Seven people on the LRV were injured, and the front windshield was smashed. All of the people injured in the crash were treated and released from the hospital on the same day. This is reportedly the only remaining intersection in the nation where an active freight rail line crosses a fixed active rail transit line.

Route 11 was renamed as the T4 on February 24, 2025.

== Stations and stops ==
All are in either the city of Philadelphia or the borough of Darby.

Neighborhood/ location	Station or stop	Connections	Notes
Market East	13th Street	SEPTA Metro: SEPTA City Bus: 27, 31, 32	Closed between 12:30–5:00am
Penn Center	15th Street/City Hall	SEPTA Regional Rail: all lines (at Suburban Station); SEPTA Metro: SEPTA City Bus: 4, 16, 17, 27, 31, 32, 33, 38, 44, 48; SEPTA Suburban Bus: 124, 125	Late night terminus
Penn Center	19th Street	SEPTA Metro: SEPTA City Bus: 17, 31, 38, 44, 48; SEPTA Suburban Bus: 124	
Center City; West	22nd Street	SEPTA Metro: SEPTA City Bus: 7, 31, 44; SEPTA Suburban Bus: 124, 125	Replaced 24th Street station
University City	Drexel Station at 30th Street	Amtrak (at 30th Street Station); NJ Transit: ACL Atlantic City Line (at 30th Street Station); SEPTA Regional Rail: all lines (at 30th Street Station); SEPTA Metro: SEPTA City Bus: 31, 49, LUCY	No direct passage to 30th Street Station
University City	33rd Street	SEPTA Metro: SEPTA City Bus: 30, 31, 49, LUCY	Serves Drexel University
University City	36th–Sansom	SEPTA Metro: SEPTA City Bus: 21	Serves University of Pennsylvania
University City	37th–Spruce	SEPTA Metro: SEPTA City Bus: 40, 42, LUCY	Serves University of Pennsylvania, Children's Hospital of Philadelphia
Spruce Hill	40th Street Portal	SEPTA Metro: SEPTA City Bus: 30, 40, 42, LUCY	End of T2 concurrency
Spruce Hill	Chester–Woodland	SEPTA Metro: SEPTA City Bus: 30	End of T3 concurrency
Spruce Hill	41st–Woodland (EB)	SEPTA Metro: SEPTA City Bus: 30	
Spruce Hill	42nd–Woodland	SEPTA Metro:	
Spruce Hill	43rd–Woodland (WB); 45th–Woodland (EB)	SEPTA Metro:	
Squirrel Hill	46th–Woodland	SEPTA Metro:	
Squirrel Hill	47th–Woodland (EB)	SEPTA Metro:	
Kingsessing	48th–Woodland	SEPTA Metro:	
Kingsessing	49th–Woodland	SEPTA Metro: SEPTA City Bus: 12, 52, 64	End of T5 concurrency
Kingsessing	50th–Woodland	SEPTA City Bus: 12, 52	
Kingsessing	51st–Woodland	SEPTA City Bus: 52	
Kingsessing	52nd–Woodland	SEPTA City Bus: 52	
Kingsessing	53rd–Woodland	SEPTA City Bus: 52	
Kingsessing	54th–Woodland		
Kingsessing	55th–Woodland		
Kingsessing	56th–Woodland		
Kingsessing	57th–Woodland		
Kingsessing	58th–Woodland	SEPTA City Bus: 63	
Elmwood	60th–Woodland		
Elmwood	61st–Woodland		
Elmwood	62nd–Woodland	SEPTA City Bus: 63	
Elmwood	63rd–Woodland		
Elmwood	64th–Woodland		
Elmwood	65th–Woodland	SEPTA Suburban Bus: 108	
Elmwood	66th–Woodland		
Elmwood	67th–Woodland		
Elmwood	68th–Woodland		
Elmwood	69th–Woodland		
Elmwood	70th–Woodland		
Elmwood	71st–Woodland		
Elmwood	72nd–Woodland		
Elmwood	Island–Woodland	SEPTA City Bus: 68	
Darby	Front–Main		
Darby	2nd–Main		
Darby	3rd–Main		
Darby	4th–Main		
Darby	5th–Main		
Darby	6th–Main		
Darby	Summit–Main		
Darby	Mill–Main (EB)		
Darby	Powell–Main (WB)		
Darby	Darby Transit Center	SEPTA Metro: SEPTA Suburban Bus: 113, 114, 115	Limited T3 service
