= T1 (SEPTA) =

Light rail line in Philadelphia, Pennsylvania

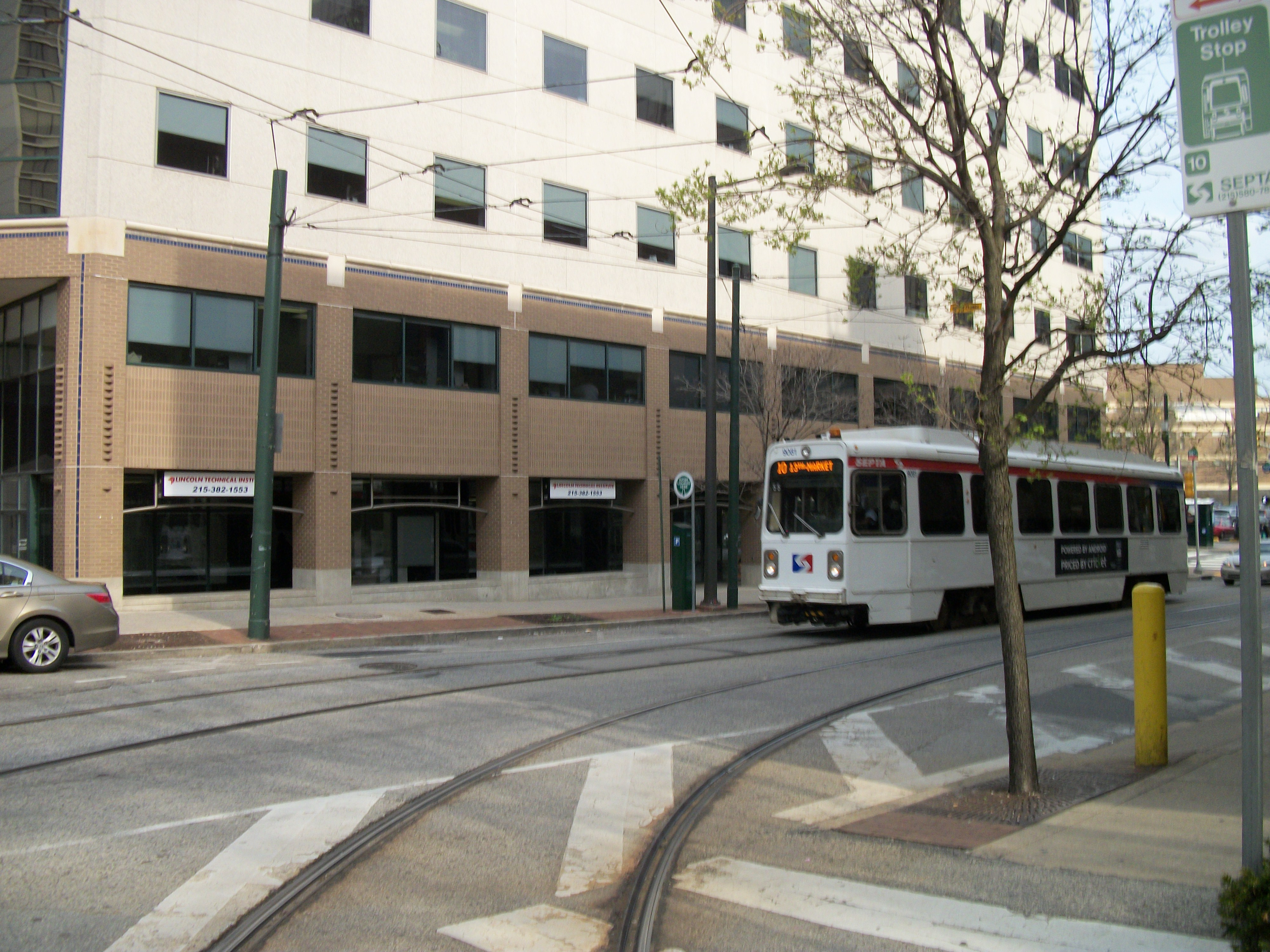
- A trolley approaching 36th Street Portal in 2011

Overview
- Termini: 13th Street; 63rd–Malvern/Overbrook
- Stations: 6 underground stations, 1 surface level station, and 38 street-level stops

Service
- Type: Trolley
- System: SEPTA Metro
- Operator: SEPTA
- Depot: Callowhill Depot
- Daily ridership: 11,589 (2019 weekday ridership)

Technical
- Line length: 11.6 mi (18.7 km)
- Track gauge: 5 ft 2 1/4 in (1,581 mm) Pennsylvania trolley gauge
- Electrification: Overhead line, 600 V DC
Route map
Template:T1 (SEPTA)

The T1, formerly Route 10, is a trolley line and one of the five T services of the SEPTA Metro. It connects 13th Street station in Center City Philadelphia, Pennsylvania, to the 63rd–Malvern/Overbrook station in the Overbrook section of West Philadelphia.

== Route description ==
Starting from its eastern terminus at 13th Street, the T1 runs in a subway tunnel under Market Street. It has underground station stops at 15th Street/City Hall, 19th Street, 22nd Street, Drexel Station at 30th Street, and 33rd Street. From 15th to 30th Streets, it runs on the outer tracks of the Market Street subway tunnel used by the L. Passengers may transfer free of charge to the L at 13th Street, 15th Street, and 30th Street and to the B at 15th Street. Connections to the SEPTA Regional Rail can be made at either 15th Street/City Hall Station or Drexel Station at 30th Street. There is an underground passageway that connects 30th Street Station to Drexel Station at 30th Street, but this has long been sealed off due to high crime. An underground passageway continues to serve between the 13th and 15th Street/City Hall stations and Jefferson Station and Suburban Station, respectively.

The T1 exits the subway at the 36th Street Portal, whereas the other T services surface at the 40th Street Portal. The T1 then runs north on 36th Street, passing the University City Science Center as it approaches Lancaster Avenue (US 30). At Lancaster Avenue there is a wye cutback, which at one point connected to the former Route 38 trolley to Lancaster Avenue when the T1 Line continued straight down Lancaster Avenue to Market Street, where it connected to a now-closed subway entrance at 23rd & Market Streets.

Continuing northwest on Lancaster Avenue, the T1 crosses over 40th Street, where there is a southbound track which diverts the T1 to 40th & Filbert Streets when the T subway tunnel is closed. At 41st Street there is a northbound track by which the T1 returns from 40th & Filbert Station. The tracks on 40th and 41st Streets continue north of Lancaster Avenue (part of the PTC Route 40 trolley line until September 9, 1956) to Girard Avenue and connect to the G.

Continuing northwest along Lancaster Avenue to 48th Street, the T1 intersects Girard Avenue, where the G trackage joins that of the T1; as Girard is offset by Lancaster Avenue, the two routes briefly share tracks before the G turns left to continue up Girard Avenue.

At 52nd Street the line reaches Lansdowne Avenue, where another cutback loop exists, installed in 1996 for emergency or schedule adjustments only. The T1 turns west on Lansdowne Avenue and at 60th Street, a pair of tracks on 60th formerly ended just short of the south side of Lansdowne Avenue. These tracks once belonged to SEPTA Route 46 when it was a trolley line (abandoned on August 11, 1957), and later served as pull-in/pull-out tracks for the then-Route 10 before it was moved to SEPTA's Elmwood Depot. The tracks can also be used when the tracks on Lansdowne and Lancaster Avenues are closed, this gives it a longer routing via 63rd Street, & Girard Avenue. When the then-Route 10 moved back to Callowhill Depot in the 2000s, trolleys pulled-in/pulled-out to Callowhill Depot via 63rd Street instead, using the outer end of Route 15 along with trackage which once belonged to the Route 41 trolley (abandoned on August 11, 1957, and now served by SEPTA Bus Route 31, another former subway–surface line until 1949). The 60th Street tracks were removed between Lancaster and Haverford Avenues in the early 2000s. The T1 turns north from Lansdowne onto 63rd Street, on which the line continues until it finally reaches the Malvern Loop, which has two (formerly three) tracks, sharing the off-street loop with SEPTA Bus Route 46.

== History ==
The T1 was established sometime before 1887. On December 15, 1906, the line was integrated into the subway–surface trolley system by the Philadelphia Rapid Transit Company and was extended to 63rd & Malvern Streets. In 1929, it was rerouted so that it went on Landsowne and 61st rather than on Girard, replacing part of Route 44.

In 2020, two then-Route 10 LRVs collided in West Philadelphia, injuring 46.

SEPTA trolley modernization proposed new Alstom LRVs vehicles, which will be delivered from 2027 to 2030, as well as extending the T1 to Overbrook station.

== Stations and stops ==
All are located in the city of Philadelphia.

Neighborhood	Station or stop	Connections	Notes
Market East	13th Street	SEPTA Metro: SEPTA City Bus: 27, 31, 32	Closed between 12:30–5:00am
Penn Center	15th Street/City Hall	SEPTA Regional Rail: all lines (at Suburban); SEPTA Metro: SEPTA City Bus: 4, 16, 17, 27, 31, 32, 33, 38, 44, 48; SEPTA Suburban Bus: 124, 125	Late night terminus
Penn Center	19th Street	SEPTA Metro: SEPTA City Bus: 17, 31, 38, 44, 48; SEPTA Suburban Bus: 124	
Center City West	22nd Street	SEPTA Metro: SEPTA City Bus: 7, 31, 44; SEPTA Suburban Bus: 124, 125	Replaced 24th Street station
University City	Drexel Station at 30th Street	Amtrak (at 30th Street); NJ Transit: ACL Atlantic City Line (at 30th Street); SEPTA Regional Rail: all lines (at 30th Street); SEPTA Metro: SEPTA City Bus: 31, 49, LUCY	No direct passage to 30th Street Station
University City	33rd Street	SEPTA Metro: SEPTA City Bus: 30, 31, 49, LUCY	Serves Drexel University
University City	36th Street Portal		
University City	36th–Market	SEPTA City Bus: LUCY	
Powelton Village	36th–Lancaster		
Powelton Village	Powelton–Lancaster (WB)		
Powelton Village	38th–Lancaster		
Powelton Village	Saunders–Lancaster		
Powelton Village	Spring Garden–Lancaster		
Powelton Village	40th–Lancaster	SEPTA City Bus: 30, 40, 43	
Belmont	Wallace–Lancaster	SEPTA City Bus: 43	
Belmont	41st–Lancaster	SEPTA City Bus: 31, 40, 43	
Belmont	42nd–Lancaster	SEPTA City Bus: 43	
Belmont	Parrish–Lancaster		
Belmont	Ogden–Lancaster (WB); 44th–Lancaster (EB)	SEPTA City Bus: 43	
Mill Creek	Westminster–Lancaster (WB); 45th–Lancaster (EB)	SEPTA City Bus: 64	
Mill Creek	Wyalusing–Lancaster		
Mill Creek	47th–Lancaster		
Mill Creek	48th–Lancaster		
Mill Creek	Lancaster–Girard	SEPTA Metro:	
Carroll Park	49th–Lancaster		
Carroll Park	50th–Lancaster		
Carroll Park	Media–Lancaster (EB)		
Carroll Park	52nd–Lancaster (WB); Lancaster–Lansdowne (EB)	SEPTA City Bus: 52	
Overbrook	54th–Lansdowne		
Overbrook	55th–Lansdowne		
Overbrook	56th–Lansdowne		
Overbrook	57th–Lansdowne	SEPTA City Bus: 63	
Overbrook	58th–Lansdowne		
Overbrook	59th–Lansdowne		
Overbrook	60th–Lansdowne	SEPTA City Bus: 46	
Overbrook	61st–Lansdowne		
Overbrook	62nd–Lansdowne		
Overbrook	63rd–Lansdowne	SEPTA City Bus: 31	
Overbrook	Jefferson–63rd		
Overbrook	Columbia–63rd (WB); Lebanon–63rd (EB)	SEPTA City Bus: 46	
Overbrook	63rd–Malvern/Overbrook	SEPTA City Bus: 46, 63, 65	Five blocks to Overbrook Regional Rail station
