= 15th Street/City Hall station =

Railway station in Philadelphia

15th St/City Hall
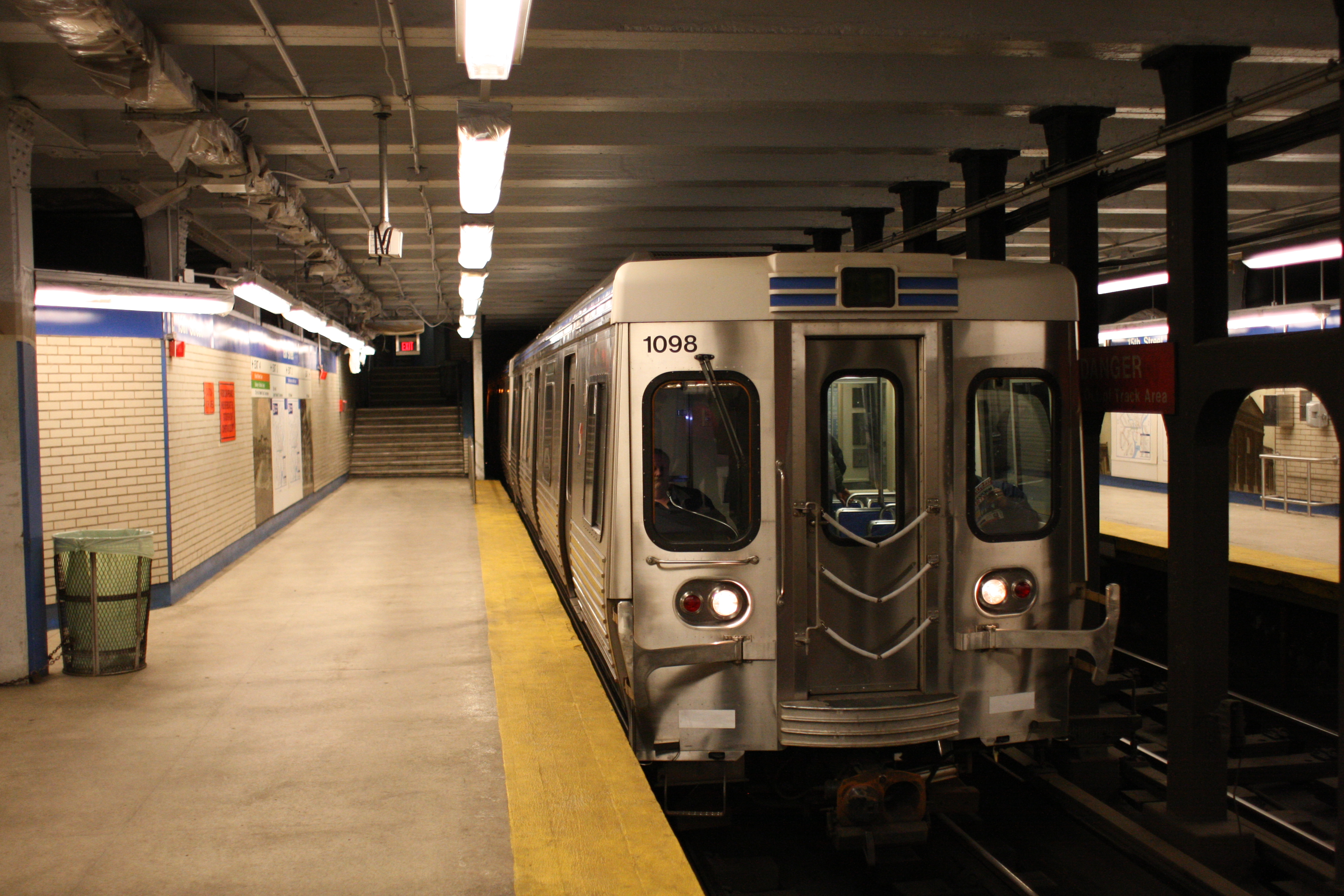
- A Market-Frankford Line (L) train at 15th Street station in 2007

General information
- Location: Market Street between 15th Street and Broad Street; Philadelphia, Pennsylvania
- Coordinates: 39.9523°N 75.1646°W
- Owner: SEPTA
- Lines: Broad Street subway Market Street subway
- Platforms: 2 side (L); 2 island (B); 2 side (T)
- Tracks: 2 (L), 4 (B), 2 (T)
- Connections: SEPTA Regional Rail (at Suburban Station); SEPTA City Bus: 4, 16, 17, 27, 31, 32, 33, 38, 44, 48; SEPTA Suburban Bus: 124, 125

Construction
- Accessible: Yes (L); Platforms accessible; vehicles not accessible (T); No, planned (B)

History
- Opened: August 3, 1907 (Market-Frankford Line); September 1, 1928 (Broad Street Line)
- Former names: 15th Street (Market-Frankford Line/Trolley Lines); City Hall (Broad Street Line)
Services
Preceding station	SEPTA Metro	Following station
Drexel Station at 30th Street toward 69th Street T.C.	L (SEPTA Metro)	13th Street toward Frankford T.C.
Walnut–Locust toward NRG Station	B (SEPTA Metro)	Race–Vine toward Fern Rock T.C.
Walnut–Locust Terminus	B (SEPTA Metro)	Race–Vine toward Fern Rock T.C.
19th Street toward 63rd–Malvern/Overbrook	T1 (SEPTA Metro)	13th Street Terminus
19th Street toward 61st–Baltimore/Angora	T2 (SEPTA Metro)	13th Street Terminus
19th Street toward Yeadon or Darby T.C.	T3 (SEPTA Metro)	13th Street Terminus
19th Street toward Darby T.C.	T4 (SEPTA Metro)	13th Street Terminus
19th Street toward 80th Street/Eastwick	T5 (SEPTA Metro)	13th Street Terminus
Former services
Preceding station	Philadelphia Transportation Company	Following station
19th Street toward 69th Street	Market Elevated	13th Street toward Frankford
Track layout
platforms
platforms
Location

15th Street/City Hall station is a rapid transit station complex in Philadelphia, Pennsylvania, located partially underneath Philadelphia City Hall. It is served by the B, L, and T lines of the SEPTA Metro system. The three lines have separate platforms connected through an underground concourse.

== Station design ==
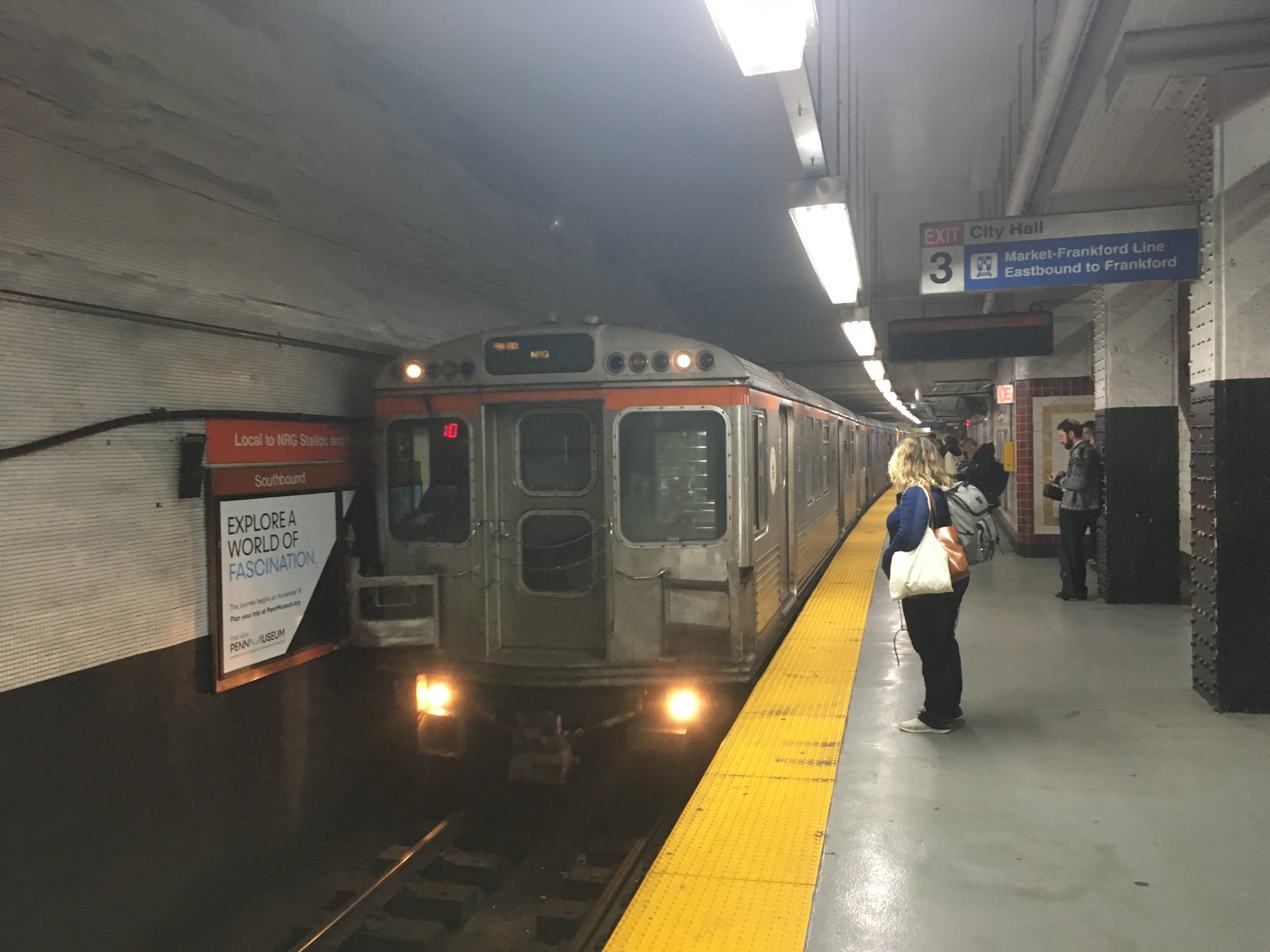
A northbound Broad Street Line local (now B1) train at the station in 2019

The Market Street Subway, used by the L and T, runs east-west under Market Street. The L uses the inner tracks, with two side platforms located between 15th Street and 16th Street. The five T services (T1, T2, T3, T4, and T5) use the outer tracks, which curve outward at 15th Street to loop around City Hall. The eastbound side platform for the T is located west of 15th Street; the westbound side platform is at the northwest corner of City Hall angled to the street grid.

The four-track Broad Street Subway, which runs primarily north-south under Broad Street, angles west of Broad Street between Penn Square South and Arch Street. It passes under the Market Street Subway. The B has two island platforms between the tracks; the inner tracks are used by B2 express service, while the outer tracks are used by B1 local service. The B platforms are divided by thick walls that support the City Hall structure above.

All six platforms at 15th Street/City Hall are connected by passageways within fare control. The concourse level has two north-south passages, outside of fare control, that flank 15th Street. They form part of the Center City Concourse, a system of underground passageways that connect transit stations in the Center City area. The concourse connects to Suburban Station and 13th Street station outside fare control; a passage formerly also connects to Walnut–Locust station. The station has nine sets of faregates; most connect to the Center City Concourse.

The station has seven full-time entrances – two on the east side of 16th Street, two on the west side of 15th Street, and three in Dilworth Park – plus two on the east side of City Hall that also serve 13th Street station. Three entrances are open limited hours: two in the City Hall courtyard (each with a separate stairs and escalator) and one in Centre Square. Two elevators connect the east concourse and street level on the east side of 15th Street on both ends of Dilworth Park; the northern elevator also serves the westbound T platform. Three elevators connect the east concourse to the L platforms and the eastbound T platform. Two additional elevators on the west side of 15th Street on Market Street connect street level, the west concourse, and the L platforms. There is no elevator access to the B platforms.

== History ==
=== 20th century ===
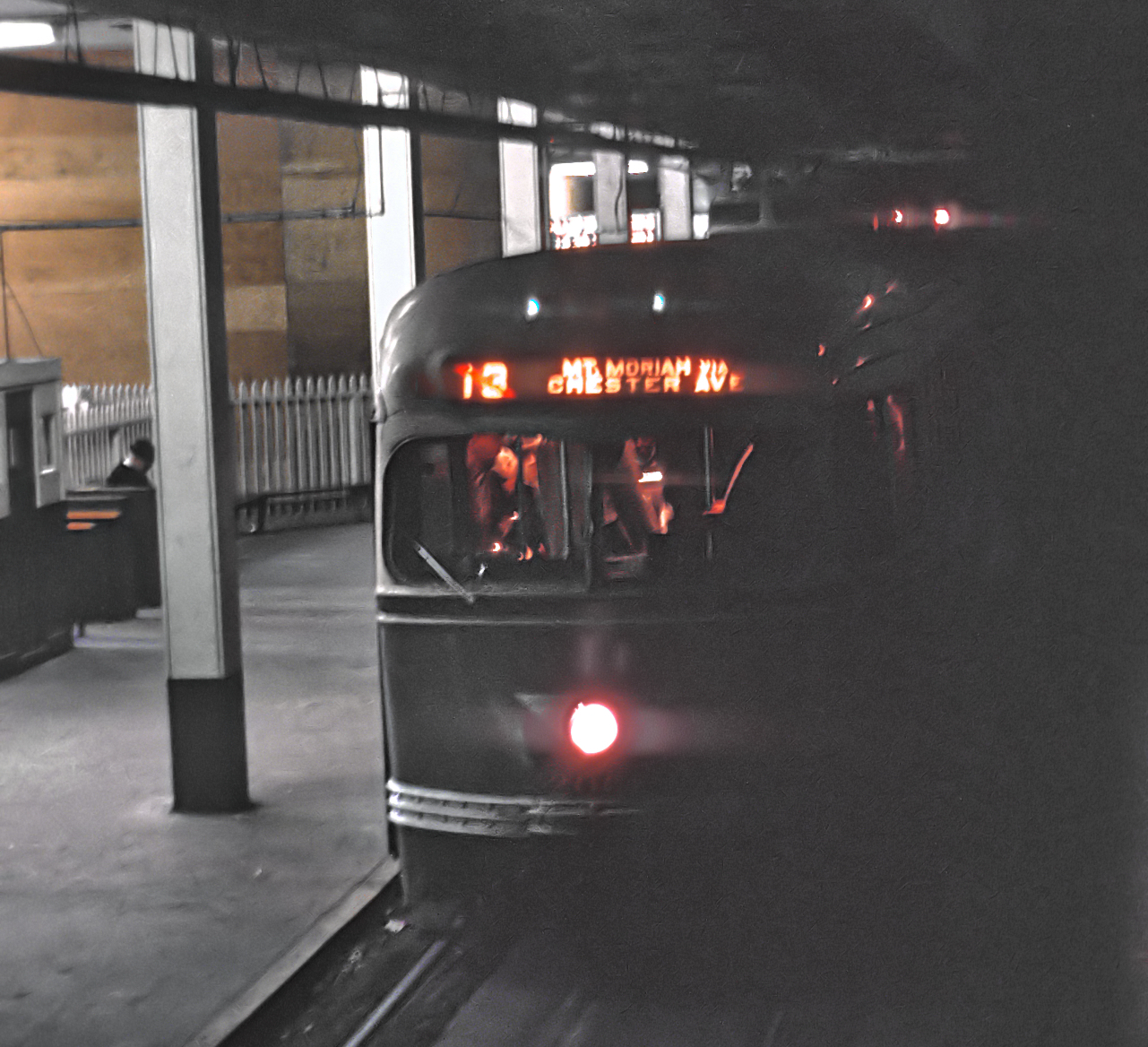
A route 13 (now T3) streetcar at the station in 1968

15th Street station was the original eastern terminus of the Market–Frankford subway–elevated, which was opened by the Philadelphia Transportation Company on August 3, 1907, and ran west to 69th Street in Upper Darby. In 1908, the Market–Frankford Line was extended eastward to Market-Chestnut (now closed). The original routing of the tracks curved around the foundations of the ornate City Hall building above, but was rebuilt into a straightened alignment in the mid-1930s in an effort to improve travel time.

Construction of City Hall station on the Broad Street Line encountered difficulties in early 1916 when the City Hall foundation settled into excavation for the station underneath. The city considered abandoning the partially-complete station, building a curved subway around the west side of the building, and placing the station to the north. The station was ultimately finished at its original location, though the line did not open until September 1, 1928. An underground concourse – later the Center City Concourse – opened on October 13, 1936, providing a connection between the 15th Street and City Hall platforms.

=== 21st century ===
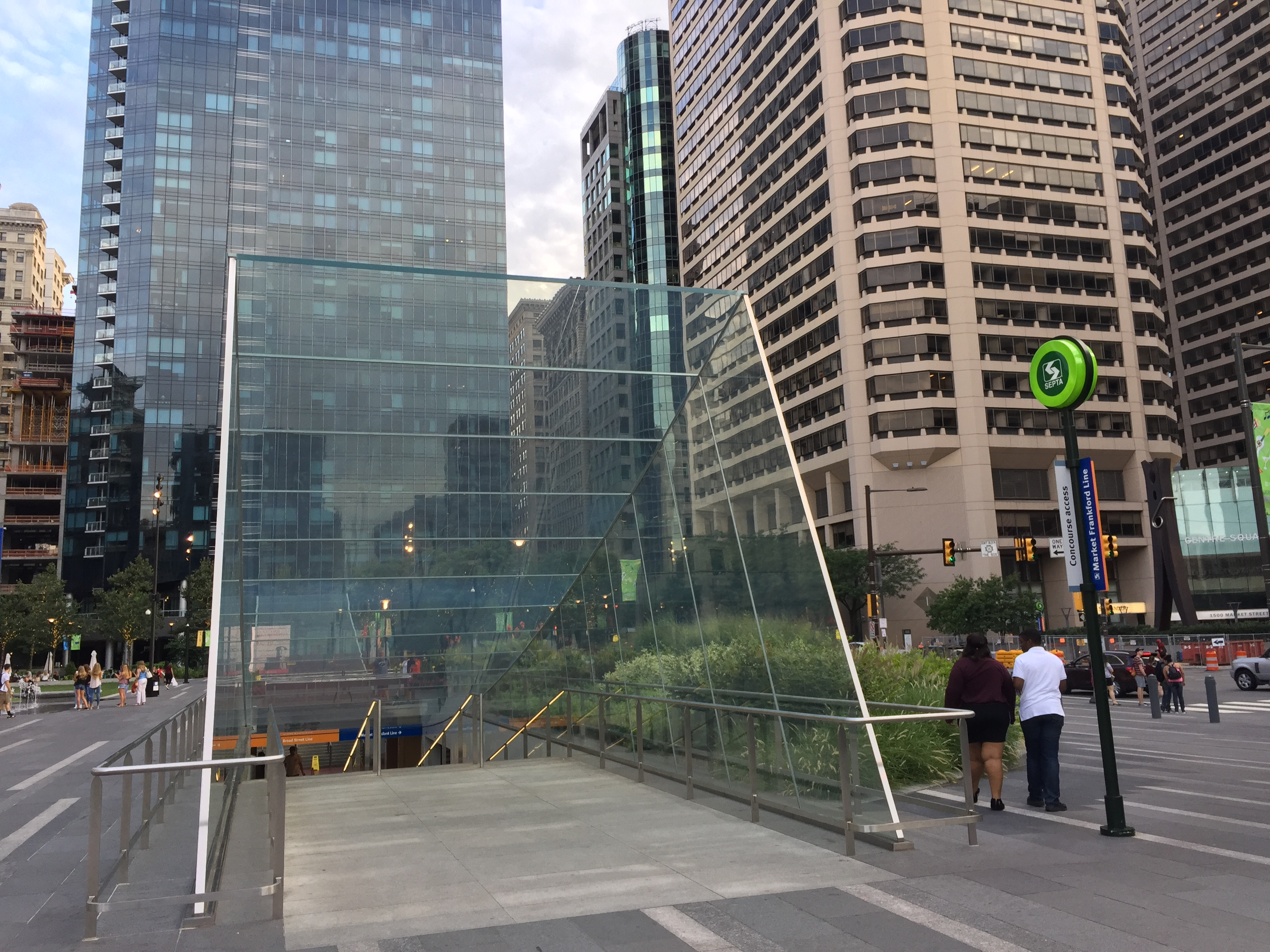
One of the 2014-opened entrances in Dilworth Park

In 2001–2003, SEPTA rebuilt an entrance to 15th Street station (on the northwest corner of Market and 15th Street) and an escalator in the City Hall courtyard. The work prompted a lawsuit by Disabled in Action of Pennsylvania, citing that renovating only one critical component would require the rest of the station complex (including the Broad Street Line portion) to be renovated for accessibility. Separately, SEPTA completed 15% design for a $100 million refurbishment of the Broad Street Line station, including accessibility improvements, in 2006. The project stalled due to lack of funding.

In September 2011, SEPTA and Disabled in Action reached a settlement under which five elevators would be installed in 15th Street station. The renovations were combined with a reconstruction of Dilworth Plaza on the west side of City Hall, which added a new underground concourse and station entrances. In November 2011, the Central City District awarded construction contracts totaling $50 million for the Dilworth Plaza work, including the two surface-to-concourse elevators. SEPTA awarded construction contracts for station improvements including the three platform elevators in January 2012. The project, originally to have been completed in July 2014, was delayed when construction crews encountered stairways, duct banks, and pipes that did not appear in blueprints. The renovated Dilworth Park, the new entrances, and the platform elevators opened on September 4, 2014. The surface elevators opened on November 12, 2014.

The 2013 passage of a state transportation funding bill allowed SEPTA to move forward with a full renovation of the station complex. Total cost was estimated at $147 million in 2015, with completion expected in 2020. Construction of the 15th Street station portion, including two new elevators, began in 2016. LED-illuminated artworks by Ray King were installed on the Market–Frankford platforms. The work was completed on October 21, 2019, at a cost of $28 million. Rebranding of the SEPTA Metro system took place in February 2025. The Market–Frankford Line became the L, the Broad Street Line became the B, and the Subway-Surface Trolley lines became the T. The complex of 15th Street and City Hall stations became 15th Street/City Hall station.

Additional renovations to the City Hall portion of the station complex began in late 2025 in preparation for 2026 United States Semiquincentennial events. They included new and relocated faregates, platform surface and flooring replacement, and wayfinding signage. Full renovations to the City Hall portion are planned to begin with modification of an interlocking near Fairmount station to allow for temporary track outages during construction. Renovations will then be made to the station passageways along with underpinning of City Hall and construction of the elevator shafts, followed by platform renovations and fitting out of the elevators. As of January 2026, the work is expected last through 2031, with a final cost of $189 million including the previous phases. When completed, the station complex will have 14 elevators.
