= 19th Street station (SEPTA) =

Subway station in Philadelphia, Pennsylvania

19th St
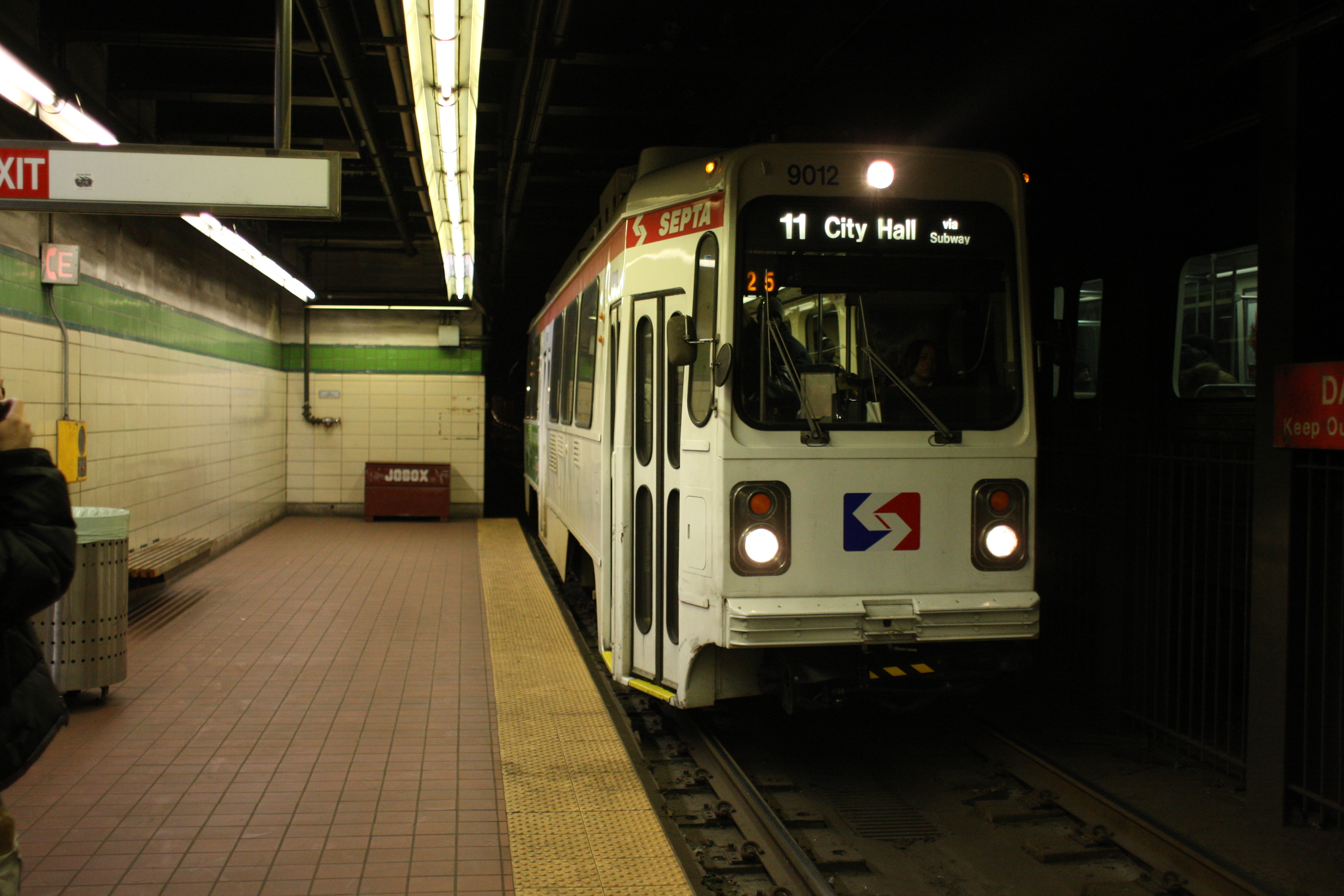
- A Route 11 trolley arrives at 19th Street station in December 2007

General information
- Location: 19th and Market streets Philadelphia, Pennsylvania, U.S.
- Coordinates: 39°57′12″N 75°10′17″W
- Owner: SEPTA
- Platforms: 2 side platforms
- Tracks: 4
- Connections: SEPTA City Bus: 17, 38, 44, 48; SEPTA Suburban Bus: 124, 125; NJ Transit Bus: 316, 414, 417, 555

Construction
- Structure type: Underground
- Accessible: No,planned

History
- Opened: 1907
Services
Preceding station	SEPTA Metro	Following station
22nd Street toward 63rd–Malvern/Overbrook	T1 (SEPTA Metro)	15th Street/City Hall toward 13th Street
22nd Street toward 61st–Baltimore/Angora	T2 (SEPTA Metro)	15th Street/City Hall toward 13th Street
22nd Street toward Yeadon or Darby T.C.	T3 (SEPTA Metro)	15th Street/City Hall toward 13th Street
22nd Street toward Darby T.C.	T4 (SEPTA Metro)	15th Street/City Hall toward 13th Street
22nd Street toward 80th Street/Eastwick	T5 (SEPTA Metro)	15th Street/City Hall toward 13th Street
does not stop here
Former services
Preceding station	Philadelphia Transportation Company	Following station
24th Street toward 69th Street	Market Elevated	15th Street toward Frankford
Location

19th Street station is an underground trolley station serving all routes of the SEPTA Metro T in Philadelphia. It is located underneath Market Street in Center City. The station was opened by the Philadelphia Transportation Company in 1907.

Touches of the original 1907 station, such as columns and railings, still remain. The station lies in the heart of Philadelphia's financial district, steps away from the Philadelphia Stock Exchange and two blocks north of Rittenhouse Square.

== History ==
The station was built by the Philadelphia Rapid Transit Company (PRT), and for the first two years formed part of a subway–surface trolley loop operating underground between 15th Street/City Hall and the Schuylkill River.

In 1907, the Market Street subway–elevated line was completed from 15th Street to 69th Street. The original line featured a bridge – located north of Market Street and south of Filbert Street – that carried both the subway and subway–surface lines over the Schuylkill River. The PRT bridge connected trolley lines in West Philadelphia to the underground subway–surface loop in Center City. 19th Street was originally the westernmost underground trolley station, as tracks rose up to an embankment west of the station to cross the PRT bridge.

The station was originally served by Subway Surface Routes 10, 11, 31, 34, 37 and 38.

Route 31 was removed from the subway in 1949 because PTC could no longer detour the line around the subway extension construction. Since Route 31's routing was hit the most with line running on Market Street, PTC converted the line into a West Philadelphia Shuttle from 46th & Market streets to 70th & Lansdowne until conversion to bus on June 19, 1956.

Route 37 was replaced by Elmwood Avenue's Route 36 and the Westinghouse routing was absorbed on November 6, 1955.

Route 38 was converted to bus on the same day the eastbound portion of the subway extension opened on October 15, 1955.

Route 13 was added to the subway surface tunnel on September 9, 1956, when Chestnut and Walnut streets rail service was converted to bus on September 8, 1956. Route 13's partner Route 42 did not receive the same treatment as Route 13 and simply converted to bus.

Route 36 replaced Route 37 in the subway surface tunnel on November 6, 1955.

Routes 10, 11 & 34 were simply rerouted into the new subway portals at 36th & Ludlow streets (Route 10) and 40th Street & Woodland Avenue (Routes 11 & 34) on October 15, 1955.

== Station layout ==
Similar to 22nd Street station, the station has two low-level side platforms with a total of four tracks. The two inner tracks are used by Market–Frankford Line trains, which travel express between 15th Street and 30th Street. There are SEPTA Key turnstiles on the westbound platform for fare collection, enabling all-door boarding and reducing the time required for fare collection. Fares must still be paid at the on-board farebox in the eastbound direction.
