= T (SEPTA) =

Light rail system in Philadelphia, Pennsylvania

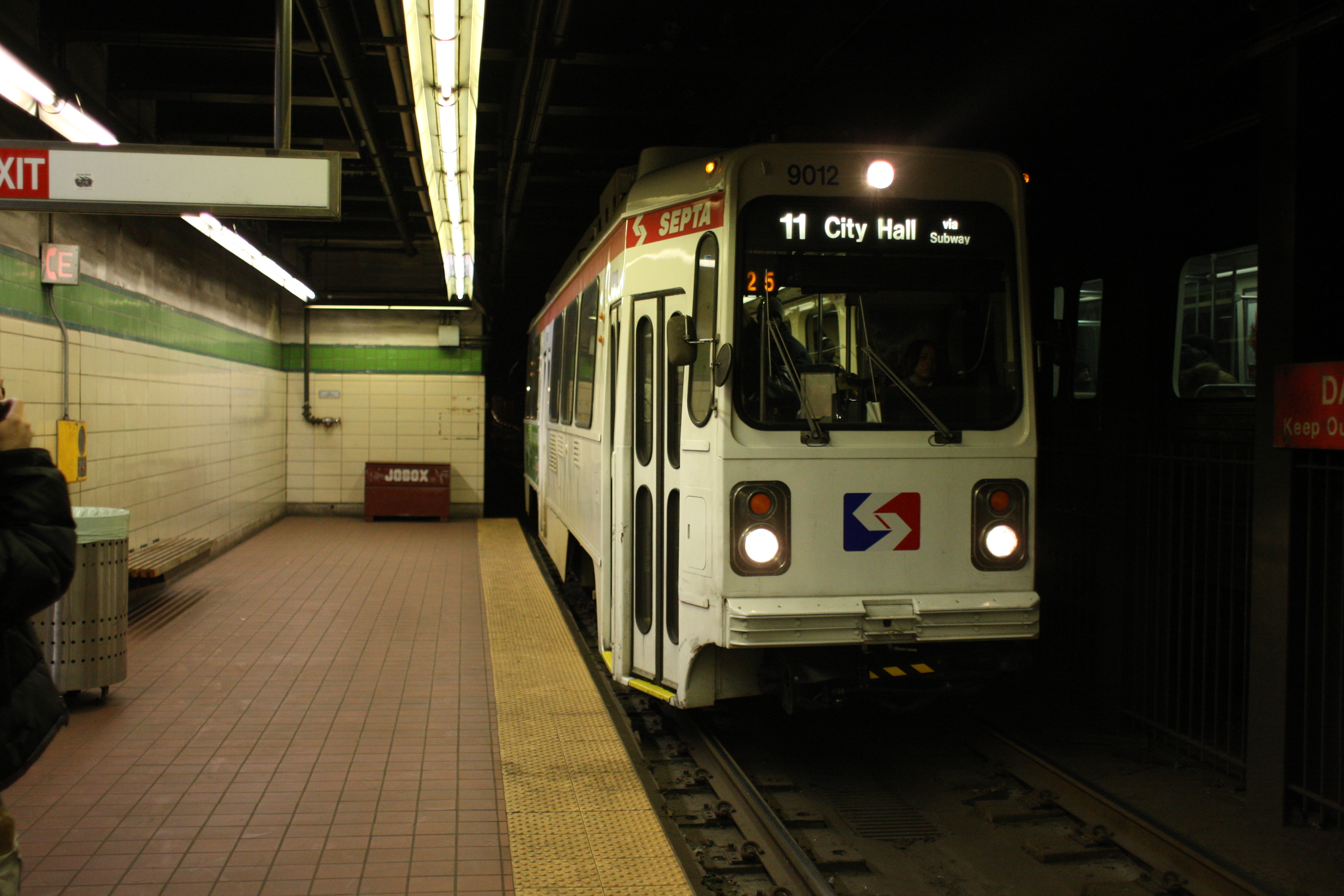
- A T4 (then known as Route 11) trolley at Drexel Station at 30th Street in 2007

Overview
- Locale: Philadelphia, Yeadon, and Darby, Pennsylvania
- Termini: 13th Street; 63rd–Malvern/Overbrook; 61st–Baltimore/Angora; Yeadon; Darby Transit Center (T3 limited); 80th Street/Eastwick
- Stations: 8 underground stations 2 surface level stations
- Website: septa.org/schedules/T

Service
- Type: Light rail
- System: SEPTA Metro
- Services: (Lancaster Avenue); (Baltimore Avenue); (Chester Avenue); (Woodland Avenue); (Elmwood Avenue)
- Operator: SEPTA City Transit Division
- Depot(s): Callowhill, Elmwood
- Rolling stock: Kawasaki Type K LRV cars
- Daily ridership: 39,897 (FY 2025)

History
- Opened: 1906

Technical
- Line length: 39.6 miles (63.7 km)
- Character: Underground and surface
- Track gauge: 5 ft 2 1/4 in (1,581 mm) Pennsylvania trolley gauge
- Electrification: Overhead line, 600 V DC

The T, (Note: Conventions for line names state they are to be referred to by letter only (i.e. "the T", not "the T line")) formerly known as the Subway–Surface Trolleys, is a light rail system of the SEPTA Metro serving Philadelphia and Delaware County, Pennsylvania. The system comprises five branches that operate on street-level tracks in West Philadelphia and Delaware County, and also underneath Market Street in Philadelphia's Center City. The branches—the T1, T2, T3, T4, and T5—collectively operate on about 39.6 miles (63.7 km) of route.

Like Boston's Green Line and San Francisco's Muni Metro, the T is the descendant of a pre-World War II streetcar system. It also shares many similarities with the premetro and stadtbahn systems of continental Europe. Where Boston and San Francisco's systems use longer, articulated LRVs, Philadelphia uses rigid LRVs roughly 4 feet (1.2 m) longer than the PCC streetcars they replaced. The lines use Kawasaki Type K LRVs delivered in 1981–82. The cars are similar to those on the D 100 series, SEPTA's suburban trolley routes, which were delivered around the same time. However, the T cars are single-ended and use trolley poles, while the suburban lines use double ended cars and pantographs for power collection.

In 2023, SEPTA signed a contract with Alstom for 130 new low-floor LRVs to be delivered. These cars are scheduled to be delivered from 2027 through 2030.

== Route description ==
=== Center City ===
The subway opened for passenger service December 15, 1906.

Starting from their eastern terminus at 13th Street station near City Hall, the trolleys loop around in a tunnel under City Hall before stopping under Dilworth Park at 15th Street station and then realign back under Market Street.

All five branches also stop at 19th Street, 22nd Street, Drexel, and 33rd Street, which are all underground stations. From 15th to 30th Streets, they run in the same tunnel as SEPTA's L, which runs express on the inner tracks while the T branches utilize the outer ones.

Passengers may transfer free of charge to the L at 13th, 15th, and 30th Streets, as well as to the B at 15th Street. Connections to the Regional Rail are also available via underground passageways connecting 13th and 15th Street stations to Suburban Station, one of the city's main commuter rail terminals.

=== University City ===
After traveling under the Schuylkill River, the T lines provide access to 30th Street Station, the Philadelphia area's main intercity rail and commuter rail station, located across the street from the L and T station. Connections are available to SEPTA Regional Rail, many Amtrak services, and New Jersey Transit's Atlantic City Line. An underground passageway that connects these two stations was closed in the 1980s due to safety concerns. In 2016, the 30th Street Station District proposed overhauling both 30th Street Station and SEPTA's rapid transit and light rail station including, by public demand, reopening the tunnel that connects the two (currently separate) stations. Presently, passengers connecting to and from the T and L must walk outside to cross the busy 30th Street, and enter the other station. The timeline called for the tunnel overhaul to be part of Phase 1 and thus completed by 2020.

All routes then stop at 33rd Street, near Drexel University. After this stop, T1 diverts from the other routes and emerges from the tunnel at the 36th Street Portal just south of Market Street, then turns north onto 36th Street and then northwest along Lancaster Avenue and other surface streets. The other four lines make underground stops at 36th and Sansom streets and 37th and Spruce streets on the campus of the University of Pennsylvania before surfacing at the 40th Street Portal near Baltimore Avenue, heading southwest on surface streets.

=== Points south and west ===
The T4 travels along Woodland Avenue in Philadelphia and Main Street in Darby. It crosses a CSX Transportation railroad line at grade, one of very few at-grade crossing between a light rail line and a major freight rail line in the United States. (Another belongs to the TECO streetcar system in Tampa, Florida.)

=== Diversion services ===
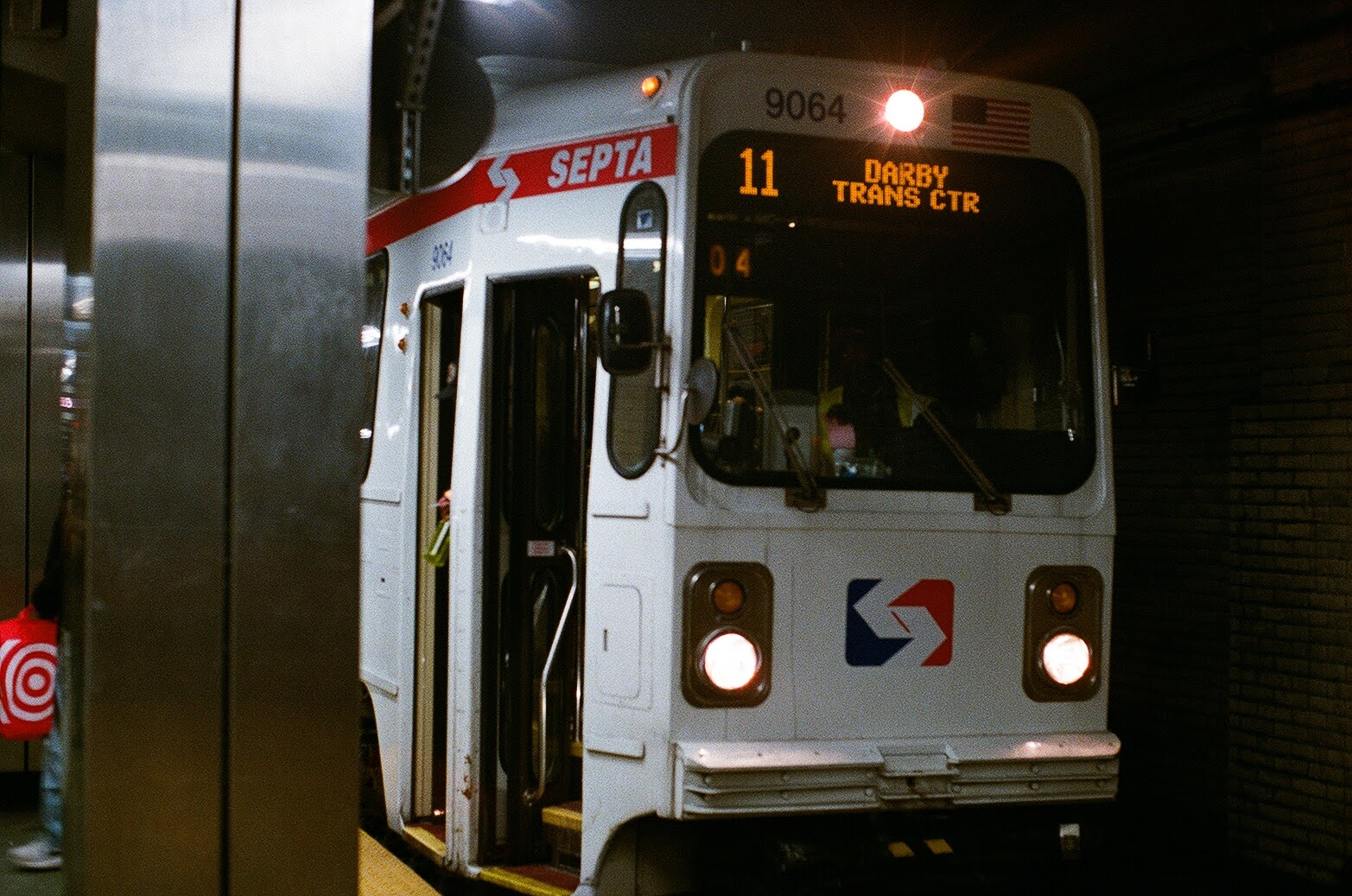
A SEPTA 11/T4 trolley arrives at 15th St Station

All five branches can be diverted onto auxiliary surface tracks west of the 40th Street Portal when tunnels are closed due to maintenance, an accident, or some other obstruction.

Tracks for the T1 start at Lancaster Avenue and proceed southbound along 40th Street. At Market Street, the line connects to the Market–Frankford Line at its 40th Street station. The surface tracks continue southbound to Spruce Street, where they split either eastbound or westbound. Westbound tracks run to 42nd Street where they turn south to either Baltimore Avenue (T2), Chester Avenue (T3), or Woodland Avenue (T4 and T5). Eastbound tracks continue east on Spruce Street to 38th Street, north on 38th Street to Filbert Street, then west on Filbert Street to 40th Street.

Tracks for the four routes besides the T1 run northbound along 42nd Street, then turning east onto Spruce Street and then north onto 38th Street (US 13). From here, they travel to Filbert Street, then turn west and cross to 40th Street where a switch allows for westbound T2-T5 LRVs to go back westbound, straight for connection to the T1 via Filbert & 41st Streets. At 40th Street, the T2-T5 turn left and follow the tracks south on 40th Street to Spruce Street, where they then follow Spruce Street west to 42nd Street and then south on 42nd Street to branch off on their respective avenues as mentioned in the previous section.

Meanwhile, the Filbert Street tracks also continue west to Filbert Street's terminus at 41st Street, and then turn right to head north on 41st Street until reaching Lancaster Avenue where they split to go left (westbound) on the T1, or north to Ogden Street and then east to 40th Street. At 40th & Ogden Streets, the track splits again to go left (north) on 40th Street to Girard Avenue to connect with the G1, or right (south) on 40th Street to Lancaster Avenue to connect to the T1 or further south on 40th Street to connect to the rest of the T lines at Filbert Street.

Another set of diversionary tracks branch from the T4 tracks in a west to south direction at Baltimore Avenue & 49th Street and proceed south on 49th Street, where they meet the T3 at Chester Avenue (which is also a transfer point at the nearby 49th Street Regional Rail station). Another set of west to south switches connects the T3 at Chester Avenue to 49th Street. The tracks continue south on 49th Street to Woodland Avenue, where a switch diverges just north of Woodland Avenue to access SEPTA's Woodland Heavy Maintenance Facility (which sits in the block between 49th & 50th Streets and Woodland and Greenway Avenues; formerly the site of the PTC Woodland Carbarn until it caught fire in 1975, destroying 60 LRVs. The depot was later torn down and the current shops built on the site). A three-way switch at Woodland Avenue allows for a turn left to go east on Woodland Avenue to connect with the eastbound T4 & T5, right to go west on Woodland Avenue for the T5, or straight to go south on 49th Street to connect with the T5 (which also diverges from the T4 here to proceed westbound to Eastwick) and provide access to the current Elmwood District that houses the entire fleet minus the LRVs housed at Callowhill District for the T1.

== History ==
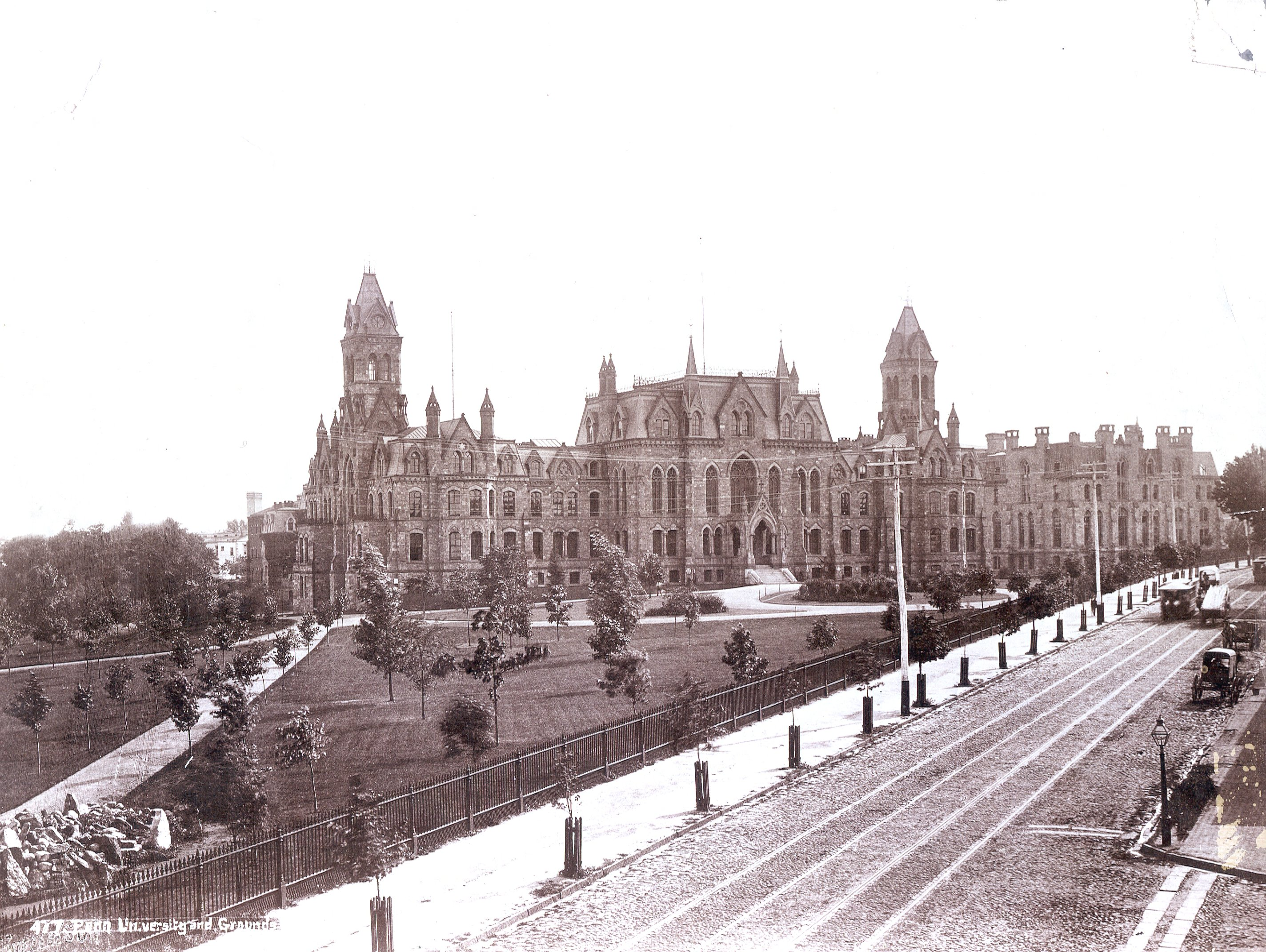
College Hall and Logan Hall on the campus of the University of Pennsylvania, as viewed from Woodland Avenue c. 1892.

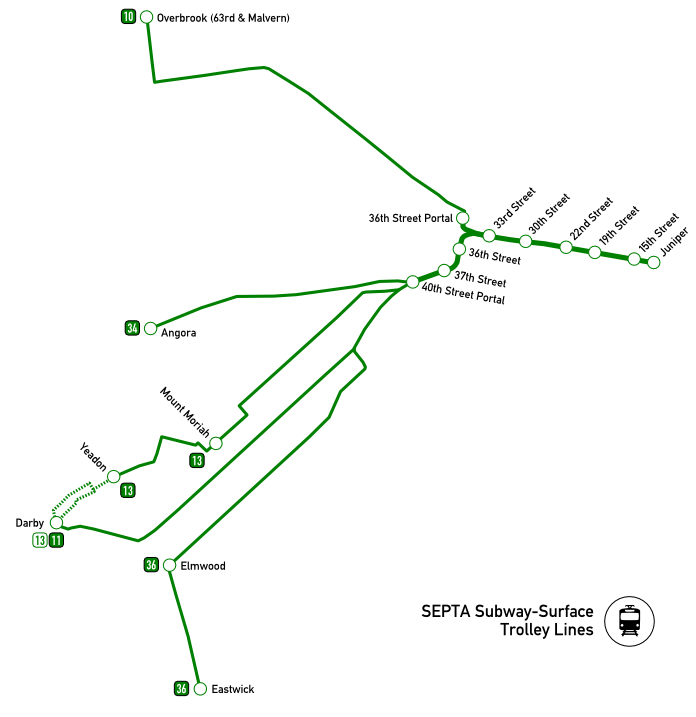
Schematic map of subway–surface branches and termini

The T is a remnant of the far more extensive streetcar system that developed in Philadelphia after the arrival of electric trolleys in 1892. Several dozen traction companies were consolidated in 1902 into the Philadelphia Rapid Transit Company. The PRT funneled the West Philadelphia lines into subway tunnels as they approached the city center. After the PRT declared bankruptcy in 1939, it was reopened as the Philadelphia Transportation Company (PTC), which was absorbed into SEPTA in 1968.

In October 2006, University of Pennsylvania's class of 1956 funded the construction of an innovative portal for one of the eastbound entrances of the 37th Street station: a replica of a Peter Witt trolley of the kind manufactured by J. G. Brill and Company from 1923 to 1926. Operated by the Philadelphia Transportation Company, these trolleys brought university students to the campus and to Center City until 1956. Routes 11, 34 and 37 ran through the Penn campus on Woodland Avenue and Locust Streets for nearly 65 years. In 1956, the trolley route was buried to enable the university to unify its campus, with Woodland Avenue and Locust Street becoming pedestrian walkways.

The then-subway–surface lines operated "Lifeline Service" due to the COVID-19 pandemic. As of April 2020, the then-Route 34 was completely suspended, and the remaining routes bypassed the 36th Street, 33rd Street, 19th Street, and 13th Street stations in the Market Street tunnel. Service on the then-Route 34 resumed on May 17, 2020. Service to the closed stations resumed in June 2020.

A crash on December 9, 2021, between car 9070 and a CSX freight train resulted in injuries to 7 passengers.

In 2021, SEPTA proposed rebranding their rail transit service as "SEPTA Metro", to make the system easier to navigate. Under this proposal, the subway–surface lines were rebranded as the "T" with a green color and numeric suffixes for each service. The 10, 34, 13, 11, and 36 respectively became the T1 (Lancaster Avenue), T2 (Baltimore Avenue), T3 (Chester Avenue), T4 (Woodland Avenue), and T5 (Elmwood Avenue).

New station and line names took effect systemwide on February 23–24, 2025. The old station and line names were used alongside the new names for several months.

During scheduled maintenance in Fall 2025, SEPTA replaced the 3 inch sliders on the trolley poles with new 4 inch sliders which were expected to last longer. However, these caused damage to overhead infrastructure and resulted in incidents on October 14th and 22nd that required passenger evacuation. Service in the tunnel was suspended on November 7, and resumed in February 2026.

== Rolling stock ==
=== Active fleet ===
Year built	Manufacturer	Model	Image	Length	Width	Routes served	Quantity
1980–1982	Kawasaki	Series 9000 (K-car)		50 ft (15 m)	102 in (2.59 m)	10, 11, 13, 34, 36	111 (1 scrapped)

The entire T network is run using Kawasaki Series 9000 light rail vehicles, nicknamed "K-cars". These K-cars are the only modern unidirectional streetcars in the United States, featuring a single cab and doors on the right side only. Introduced in the early-1980s, they replaced the PCC streetcar which had served Philadelphia in one form or another since 1940. While the other American subway–surface systems (the MBTA Green Line and Muni Metro) collaborated with Boeing on the SLRV, Philadelphia was able to avoid that vehicle's misfortune due to the system's delays in deciding on a vehicle and finalizing funding.

No vehicles have been added to the fleet since the 1980s, but the fleet was refurbished by SEPTA staff around 2000. Vehicles include air conditioning, large windows, door-opening sensors for the rear doors, and an automated system to display and announce upcoming stops.

K-Car no. 9000 was painted in a special heritage scheme (reminiscent of the one it wore when new in 1980).in March 2024. Car 9100 was also painted into the scheme the following year.

=== Future rolling stock ===
In 2023, SEPTA awarded a $714.2 million contract to Alstom Transportation for 130 new low-floor LRVs, with an option for 30 more. The LRVs will be of Alstom's Citadis family, measuring 80 feet (24 m) in length. The 100% low-floor design means that they will be fully accessible and ADA-compliant, whereas the current Kawasaki LRVs from the early 1980's are not. The LRVs will be used on SEPTA's T, its G in Philadelphia, and its D in neighboring Delaware County. The first LRV is expected to be delivered from Alstom in the spring of 2027, with the last LRV to be delivered in 2030.

== Routes ==
All routes terminate at 15th Street station between 12:30 a.m. and 5:00 a.m. when 13th Street is closed. On Sunday evenings and during unexpected diversions, all routes are diverted to surface streets and terminate at 40th and Filbert Streets and then are directed to walk a quarter of a block south on 40th Street to the Market-Frankford Line at 40th Street station. Former trolley routes, which have since been replaced with bus service, are shaded in gray.

The T2 and T4 do not have overnight service.

Route	Length in miles (km)	Service began	Service ended	Western terminus	Eastern terminus	Main streets of travel	Depot	Notes
T1 (SEPTA)	5.9 (9.5)	c. 1887		63rd–Malvern/Overbrook	13th Street (Note: All routes terminate at 15th Street station between 12:30 a.m. and 5:00 a.m. when 13th Street is closed. On Sunday evenings and during unexpected diversions, all routes are diverted to surface streets and terminate at 40th and Filbert Streets and then are directed to walk a quarter of a block south on 40th Street to the Market-Frankford Line at 40th Street station.)	63rd Street, Lansdowne Avenue, Lancaster Avenue	Callowhill	Route 10 (until 2025)
T2 (SEPTA)	4.8 (7.7)	1890		61st–Baltimore/Angora	13th Street	Baltimore Avenue	Elmwood	Route 34 (until 2025)
T3 (SEPTA)	6.9 (11.1)			Darby Transit Center (limited); Yeadon	13th Street	Chester Avenue	Elmwood	Route 13 (until 2025)
T4 (SEPTA)	6.7 (10.8)	1858		Darby Transit Center	13th Street	Woodland Avenue	Elmwood	Route 11 (until 2025)
T5 (SEPTA)	7.0 (11.3)	1904		80th Street/Eastwick	13th Street	Island Avenue, Elmwood Avenue	Elmwood	Route 36 (until 2025)
30			1915	Haddington: 65th & Vine Streets	Juniper Street	Haverford Avenue, Vine Street	Callowhill	Rerouted; replaced by bus service
31			1956	Overbrook Park: Lansdowne & Haverford Loop	Juniper Street	63rd Street, Market Street	Callowhill	Replaced by bus service
37			1955	Chester: 3rd & Crosby Streets	Juniper Street	Industrial Highway, Eastwick Avenue, Woodland Avenue	Woodland	Replaced by bus service
38			1955	Parkside: 48th & Parkside Loop	Juniper Street	Parkside Avenue, 40th Street, Baring Street	Callowhill	Replaced by bus service

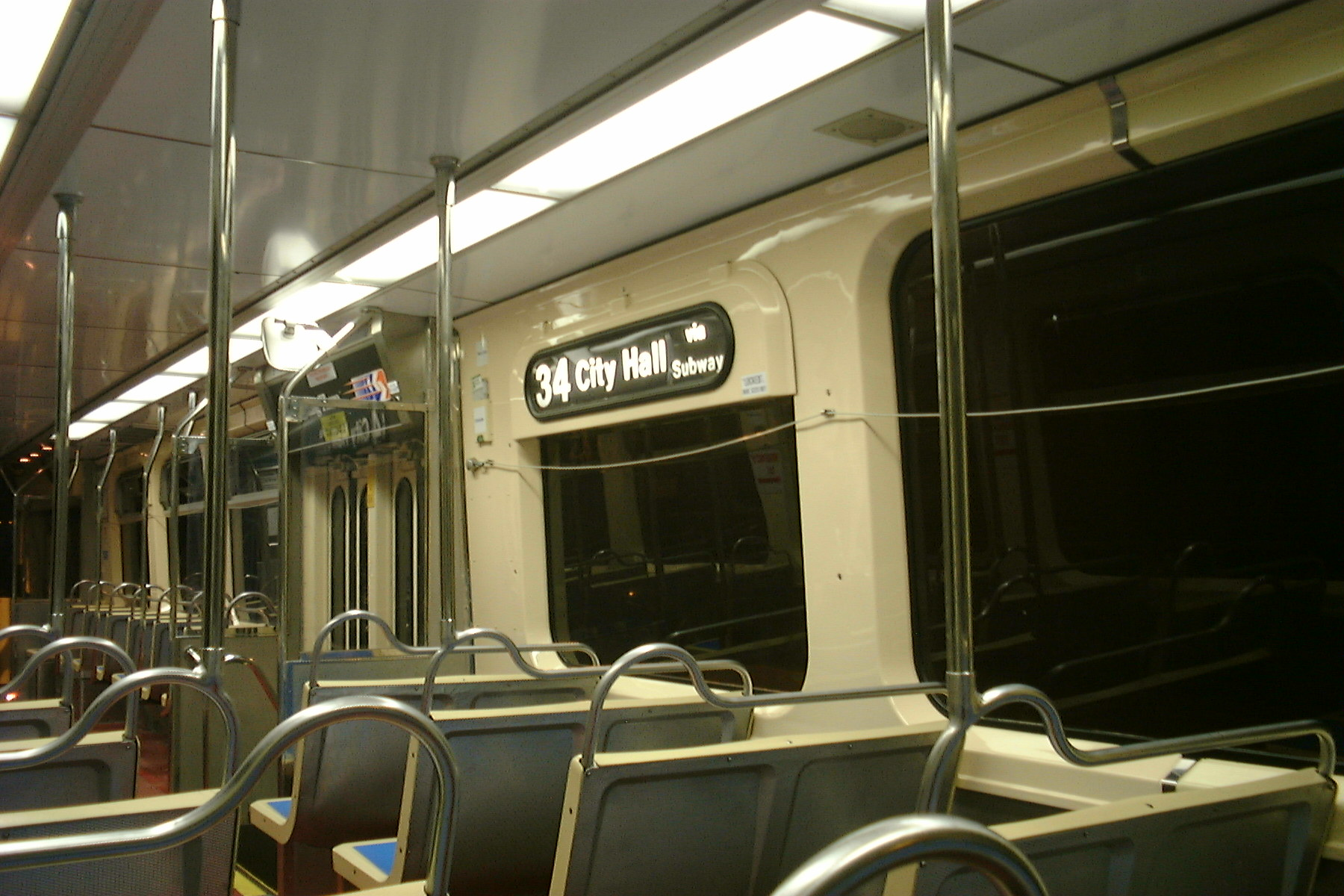
The interior of a route 34 trolley in the Center City tunnel

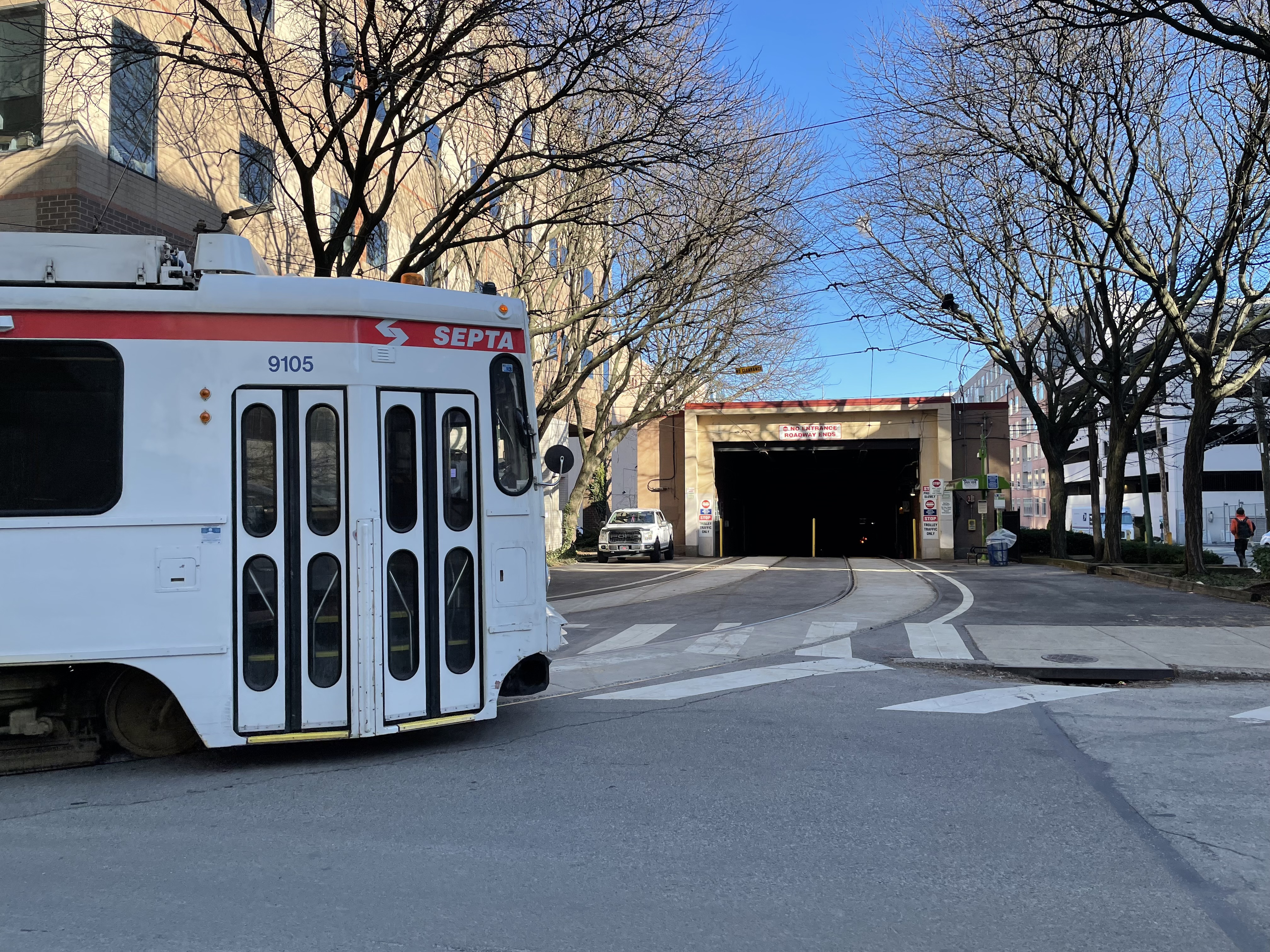
Trolley entering the tunnel at 36th St Portal

== See also ==
- Pennsylvania gauge
- SEPTA City Transit Division surface routes
- West Philadelphia Streetcar Suburb Historic District
