= West Philadelphia Passenger Railway =

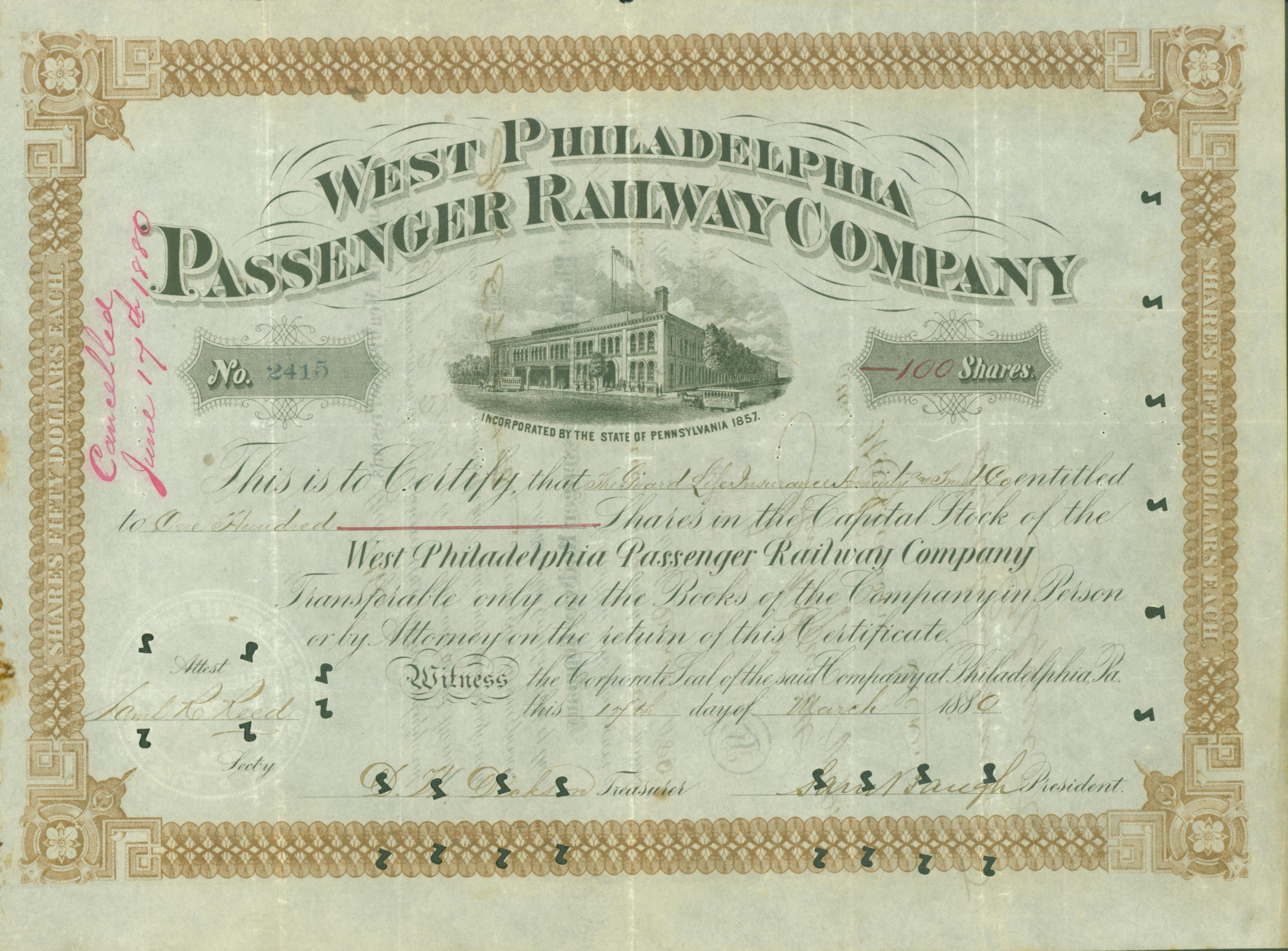
Share of the West Philadelphia Passenger Railway Company, issued 17 March 1880

The West Philadelphia Passenger Railway was an early commuter rail that opened on July 2, 1858. Initially tracks ran from 3rd Street to 41st street along Market Street. Tracks ran over the Permanent Bridge that was completed in 1887. Passengers were transported by "horse-drawn omnibuses". The railway was the second street railway to be chartered in Philadelphia when it was chartered on April 28, 1857. Portions of the railway leading to Darby followed a route similar to that of SEPTA's Route 11 today. People of color were not allowed to use the railways until an Act of the Pennsylvania General Assembly in 1867; however, they were permitted to stand on the platform with the driver.
