= SEPTA Key =

Public transit smart card used in Philadelphia

- Location: Philadelphia area
- Launched: 2016–2017
- Technology: Mastercard Contactless card issued by MetaBank
- Operator: Conduent
- Manager: SEPTA
- Currency: USD ($1 minimum load, $250 maximum load)
- Auto recharge: Available
- Validity: SEPTA
- Website: www.septakey.org

The SEPTA Key card is a smart card that is used for automated fare collection on the SEPTA public transportation network in the Philadelphia metropolitan area. It can be used throughout SEPTA's transit system, including buses and SEPTA Metro, and on Regional Rail.

== History ==
Before the Key System, SEPTA's fare collection was almost entirely manual. Monthly and Weekly passes were sold by a cashier at a SEPTA sales office. Tokens for bus, trolley and subway fare could be purchased from a vending machine at some stations, however exact change was required. Paper tickets and passes were used on Regional Rail. In 2012, SEPTA announced the Key project. In 2014, SEPTA began deploying the new hardware necessary for the system at each station.

The initial rollout of the key card on transit services began with an early adoption program starting on June 13, 2016. Sale of Key Cards was opened to the public on February 9, 2017. As of June 1, 2017, weekly and monthly TransPasses (for urban transit, distinct from the TrailPasses for SEPTA Regional Rail) were no longer available in the old format, and users of those passes had to have a Key Card. However, the sale of weekly TransPass at third-party locations continued until July 30, 2018. The sale of monthly TransPasses at third-party locations also ended in July 2018.

Sales of paper weekly/monthly TransPasses at all Regional Rail stations, token sales at most Regional Rail stations and token sales at all transit sales offices ended by April 30, 2018; however, token sales at third-party locations continued until July 15. Tokens then continued to be sold in bulk to social service agencies, as work continued to implement a new method for those organizations to provide SEPTA fares to their clients. Also in April 2018, SEPTA launched the external retail network for Key Cards, allowing cards to be purchased and reloaded at businesses across the Philadelphia area. On August 1, 2018, SEPTA stopped issuing or honoring paper transfers; the only way to use the reduced transfer fee is through the SEPTA Key card.

On August 1, 2018, SEPTA began an early adoption program for SEPTA Key on Regional Rail from select Zone 4 stations for Monthly Zone 4 TrailPass holders. On October 1, SEPTA expanded the program to include select Zone 3 stations for Monthly and Weekly TrailPass holders. The SEPTA Key program extended to Zone 1 and Zone 2 TrailPass holders on May 1, 2019. Weekly TrailPasses were available only on SEPTA Key starting the week of August 12 for Zones 3 and 4 and the week of September 9 for Zones 1 and 2, marking the end of paper Weekly TrailPass sales. Monthly TrailPasses were available only on SEPTA Key starting in October for Zones 3 and 4 and in November for Zones 1 and 2, marking the end of paper Monthly TrailPass sales.

On July 13, 2020, the Travel Wallet feature launched on Regional Rail, replacing tickets and cash, along with the Cross County Pass on a SEPTA Key card. The sale of Monthly Cross County Passes ended at third-party locations in August 2020. Sales of paper single-ride and ten-trip tickets ended on October 2. As of April 2, 2021, previously purchased paper tickets are no longer accepted for travel on Regional Rail.

Effective January 1, 2024, SEPTA no longer accepts previously purchased tokens at vehicle fareboxes or fare kiosks.

== Technology and use ==
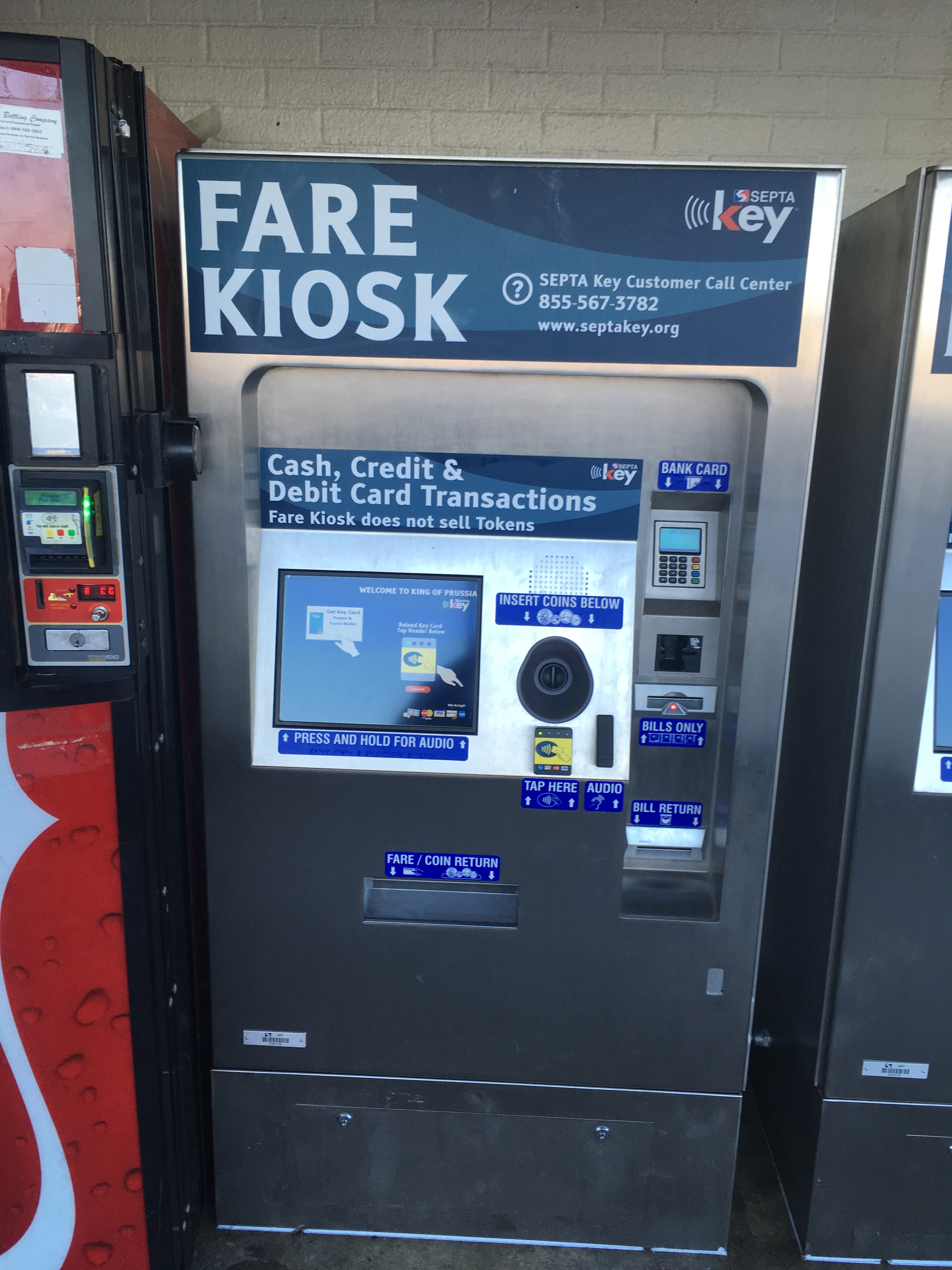
SEPTA Key Fare Kiosk at the King of Prussia Transit Center

Similar to a debit card issued by a bank, each Key card has a personalized 16 digit account number. A Mastercard Paypass chip is embedded in the card allowing it to be read wirelessly. Riders simply wave their card near a red fare validator pad. On buses, trolley routes, and the Norristown High Speed Line; the validator is mounted to the vehicle farebox. On the Broad Street Line and the Market–Frankford Line, the validators are located on the turnstiles that access the boarding area. At certain trolley stations (such as 30th Street Station or the westbound side of 19th Street station), fare is collected at the turnstiles even for trolley routes. The Norristown High Speed Line collects fares at turnstiles at 69th Street Transportation Center and Norristown Transportation Center while the fare is collected onboard at all other stations along the line. On Regional Rail, there are turnstiles with validators at the Center City Philadelphia stations while outlying stations have platform validators. Riders tap on at the turnstile or platform validator to open their trip before boarding the train and tap off at the turnstile or platform validator to close their trip after exiting the train.

The system also has a Quick Trip feature allowing a single fare for the Broad Street Line or the Market-Frankford Line to be purchased from a Key vending machine. Instead of a plastic card with an embedded chip, the system prints a paper ticket with a magnetic stripe. A rider with a quick trip ticket will swipe it at a black card reader mounted next to the red pad to access the boarding area. Quick Trips can also be used on Regional Rail's Airport Line on trips originating from the Philadelphia International Airport; they can be purchased from machines located on the platforms. Quick Trips are also used at the Regional Rail stations in Center City Philadelphia; riders arriving in Center City Philadelphia buy a Quick Trip before exiting the station turnstiles while riders departing Center City Philadelphia buy a Quick Trip before entering the station turnstiles.

A card can be loaded with a weekly, monthly or single day pass. Unlike the older paper passes, SEPTA Key imposes a limit on how many trips a rider can take on a pass (56 for a weekly pass, 240 for a monthly pass, 8 for a One Day Convenience Pass, and 10 for a One Day Independence Pass). This is designed to prevent sharing of cards. The system also has a "Travel Wallet" feature in which riders can load money on the card and have the fare for each trip deducted from the balance when the card is presented. The Travel Wallet fare is discounted from the cash fare and costs the same as a token on transit and a ticket purchased in advance on Regional Rail.

The system was designed to keep most of SEPTA's existing fare collection practices in place. For example, the system can automatically detect if a rider is transferring from another route and charge just the transfer fee.

The SEPTA Key Student Fare Card program provides K-12 students with a SEPTA Key card that can be used for up to 8 trips per school day. Cards now do not have to be upgraded to be used on Regional Rail. The SEPTA Key University Pass is a discount transit pass for college students at participating colleges. Colleges participating in the SEPTA Key University Pass program include the University of Pennsylvania, Temple University, and Drexel University.

SEPTA Key is accepted on all SEPTA rapid transit lines (Broad Street, Market-Frankford, Norristown), buses, trolleys, trackless trolleys, and Regional Rail. SEPTA Key cards were formerly accepted on DART First State buses in northern New Castle County, Delaware. Starting January 1, 2021, SEPTA Key cards were no longer accepted on DART First State buses because the fareboxes cannot read the card to confirm the purchase of TrailPasses, and due to widespread fraudulent use.

== Contract and implementation ==
In 2007, SEPTA announced a plan to award a contract for an updated fare payment system by the end of the year. At the time, it was estimated the project would take about three years and cost approximately $100 million, based on the implementation of similar fare payment systems in other cities. After the bid deadline for contractors was extended several times, in 2011 the SEPTA Board awarded a $129.5 million contract to ACS Transport Solutions Group, a division of Xerox, with 2013 as a target date for completing the implementation.

By 2013, the project was said to be a few months behind schedule, with SEPTA's Chief Officer of New Payment Technology John McGee stating "That ball of steam isn't as large as we'd like, but we're still moving along." Roll out was expected first on SEPTA Regional Rail, with transit service to follow.

By 2019, total cost of the primary contract was $192.5 million, about $70 million more than planned.

As of September 2020, the total cost was $193.3 million.

== SEPTA Key Tix ==
In December 2022, SEPTA released a public beta of SEPTA Key Tix after a months-long closed trial. This feature allows for occasional riders to buy passes for all modes of rapid transit (except Regional Rail) from a smartphone that can be scanned as a ticket via QR code. The fares for SEPTA Key Tix are the same as those on SEPTA Key, which is at a discount to cash prices. The fare also includes one free transfer, which has been unavailable with cash fares since SEPTA did away with paper transfers. There have been some complaints about SEPTA Key Tix, which have included difficulties of using the platform, disuse of money stored in the "travel wallet" to buy tickets, and no integration with mobile payment services such as Apple Pay and Google Pay; however, SEPTA has announced plans to support those and other forms of contactless payment within the program in the near future. SEPTA announced that sales ended at the beginning of March 2026 for SEPTA Key Tix and that all passes held must be used by August 28, 2026.
