= Dilworth Park =

Public space in Philadelphia

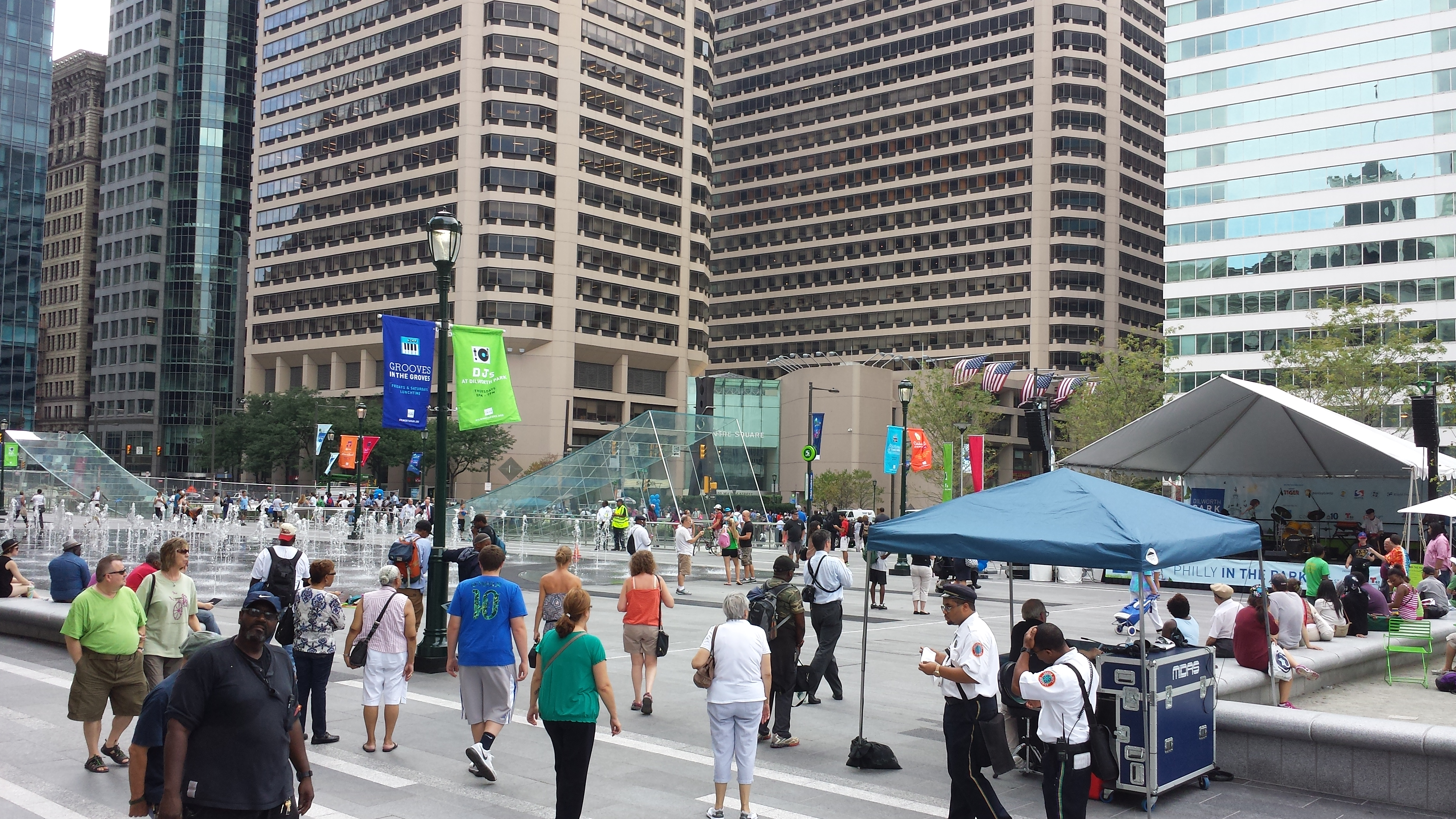
- Dilworth Park with Claes Oldenburg's sculpture Clothespin seen across the street
- Interactive map of Dilworth Park
- Type: Urban park
- Location: Philadelphia, Pennsylvania, U.S.
- Coordinates: 39.953°N 75.165°W
- Area: 0.5 acres (0.20 ha)
- Opened: September 4, 2014
- Operator: Center City District
- Status: Open
- Public transit: SEPTA

Dilworth Park is a public park and open space along the western side of City Hall in Center City, Philadelphia. Originally built as Dilworth Plaza in the 1970s, the one-half-acre (0.20 ha) park was rebuilt as Dilworth Park and opened on September 4, 2014.

== History ==
=== Creation as Dilworth Plaza ===
The land which Dilworth Park now occupies was previously part of the block to the west of Broad Street, and was occupied by the Pennsylvania Railroad's Broad Street Station from 1881 until its demolition in 1953. In the 1970s, the land was annexed and connected to City Hall to create Dilworth Plaza, a pedestrian plaza built in the brutalist style. Completed in 1977, the space was named after Richard Dilworth, a politician who twice served as mayor of Philadelphia and died in 1974, during the park's construction. It was designed by Vincent Kling.

Frank Rizzo, who was mayor of Philadelphia from 1972 to 1980, disliked Dilworth, and referred to the space exclusively as "West Plaza", despite City Council voting in 1973 to name it after Dilworth.

=== Rebuilt as Dilworth Park ===
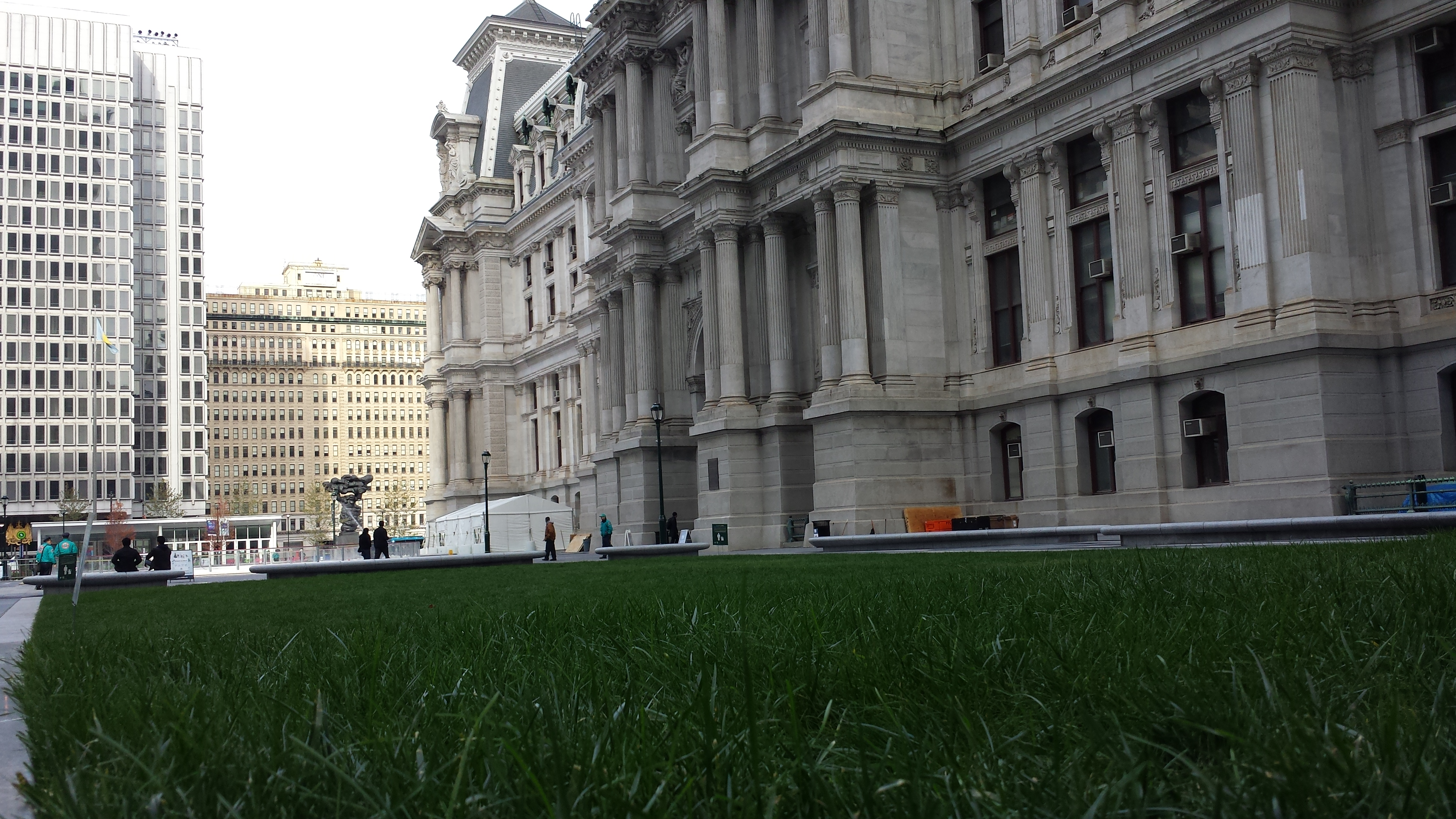
The lawn at Dilworth Park

In 2007, planning and design work began to renovate Dilworth Plaza, with a groundbreaking on January 30, 2012. Funding for the redesign was quoted at $50 million, included $15 million from the United States Department of Transportation, $15.5 million from the Commonwealth of Pennsylvania, and additional funding from the William Penn Foundation and the Knight Foundation. The park was redesigned by designed by KieranTimberlake, Urban Engineers and OLIN.

The rebuilt and renamed Dilworth Park opened on September 4, 2014. It featured reused granite from the original plaza, alongside new sloping glass pavilions which lead down to the subway concourse. The space is managed by Center City District, a business improvement district, on a long-term lease with the city.

== Features ==
Dilworth Park contains:

- grass lawns and landscaping,
- two large sloped glass stair canopies,
- a programmable fountain, which is converted to an ice skating rink in the winter
- a cafe, restaurant, and Starbucks kiosk

== See also ==
- Penn Center
- Philadelphia City Hall
- Richardson Dilworth
- List of parks in Philadelphia
