= Ray King (artist) =

American sculptor

- Born: July 4, 1950 (age 76); Philadelphia, Pennsylvania
- Known for: Sculpture

Ray King (born July 4, 1950) is an artist who is best known for his light responsive sculptures.

== Early life ==
King was born in Philadelphia, Pennsylvania, on July 4, 1950. In his early twenties, he apprenticed with a stained glass artist. In 1975, he received a Louis C. Tiffany Fellowship to travel to England and study with master stained glass artist, Patrick Reyntiens at the Burleighfield House Trust in Buckinghamshire.

When King returned, he became involved with the craft art movement of the mid-1970s. His work has been exhibited internationally since 1976, in the United States, Europe and Asia. Major permanent installations of his work have been commissioned throughout the United States and abroad. All are site-specific and inspired by the surrounding space and landscape to create a unique sense of place and identity.

The scale and scope of his art evolved dramatically over the years as King moved into the three-dimensional / public art realm. His repertoire of materials expanded to include holographic and laser-etched, light-responsive laminate films, and he mastered the use of advanced 3-D computer technology facilitating the elaborate engineering of his sculptures. His unique tectonic, site-specific works are in demand by universities, municipal art commissions and corporations around the world.

== Sculpting with light ==
King's art draws upon principles of sacred geometry to render three-dimensional shapes and patterns found in nature. Through the application of advanced design technology, and the manipulation of light and color, King creates light-responsive sculptures that interact with viewers and animate the surrounding environment.

His sculptures – inspired by geometric patterns found in nature—dynamically interact with the sun and artificial light, projecting and reflecting light into the surrounding environment, shifting in color and transparency and changing appearance with the times of day and degrees of sunlight.

King is interested in ancient cultures’ use of light in architecture and monuments, particularly how light and mathematics were used to further understand planetary movement and the Earth’s relation to the larger universe. King creates futuristic high-tech, tensile structures designed and engineered using state-of-the-art 3-D modeling software, to interact with the Sun much in the same way artists and astronomers have for thousands of years.

The primary material used in King’s work is glass which, both durable and transparent, can be laminated with refractive and reflective materials to dynamically interact with light; these include holographic films and dichroic coatings designed to bend or split light wavelengths into colors. He has vast experience creating tectonic, tensile structures made of stainless steel, tension cable, and specialty hardware.
