= Squirrel Hill, Philadelphia =

Squirrel Hill
- Neighborhood of Philadelphia
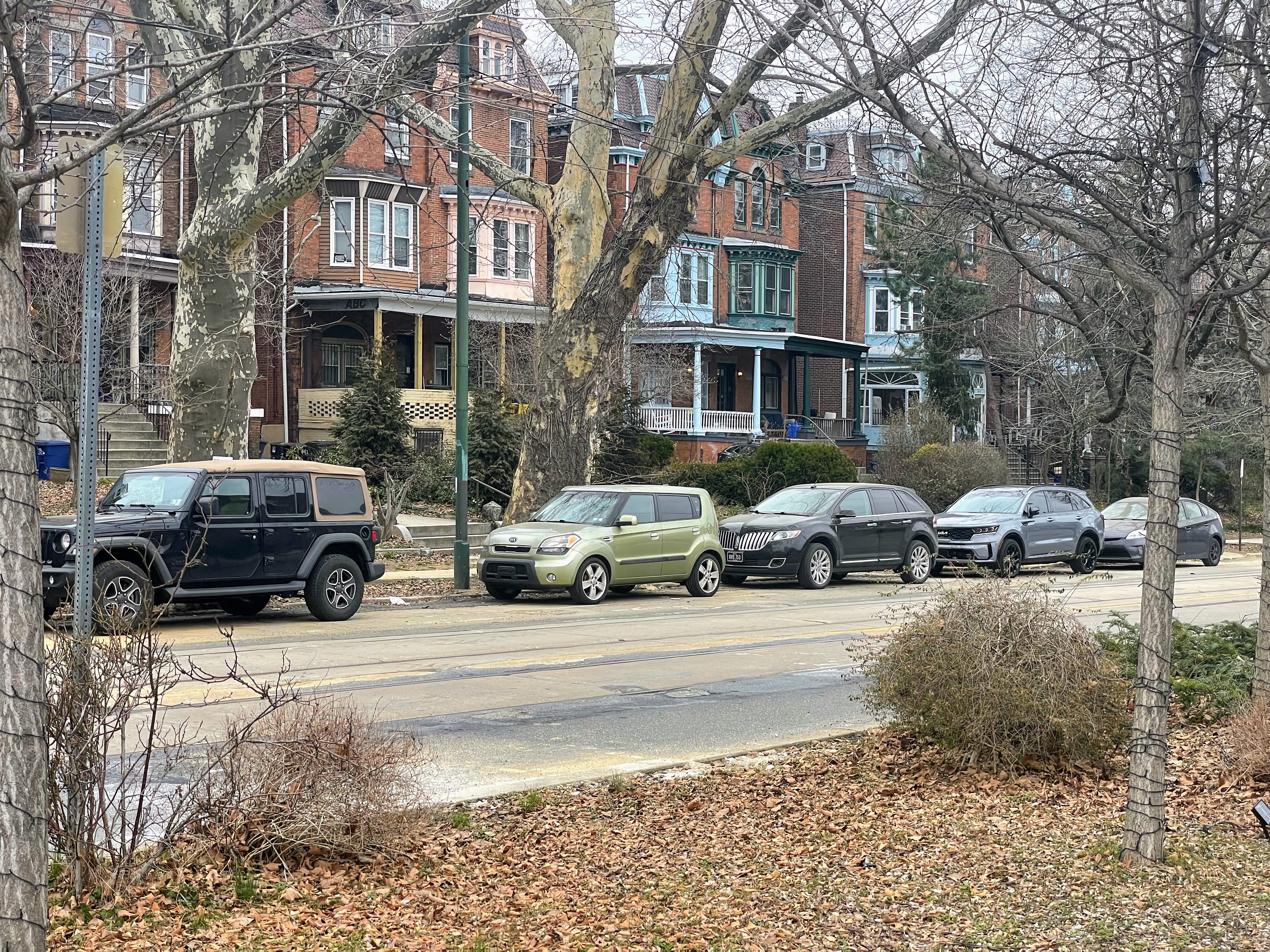
- The 4400 block of Baltimore Ave showing duplexes typical of Squirrel Hill.

- Location within Philadelphia
- Country: United States
- State: Pennsylvania
- County: Philadelphia
- City: Philadelphia
- Area codes: 215, 267, and 445

Squirrel Hill is a neighborhood in West Philadelphia, Pennsylvania, United States, south of Baltimore Avenue and west of Clark Park. It shares a border with the Spruce Hill and Cedar Park neighborhoods. By some accounts, this neighborhood is within the boundaries of the University City district.

== See also ==
- Squirrel Hill - A neighborhood in Pittsburgh, Pennsylvania.
