= SEPTA Route 38 =

Public transit route in Philadelphia, US

Route 38

Overview
- System: Callowhill
- Operator: SEPTA City Transit Division
- Former operator(s): Philadelphia Transportation Company

Route
- Locale: Philadelphia
- Start: 5th and Market Streets
- Via: Benjamin Franklin Parkway, Belmont Avenue
- End: Wissahickon Transportation Center
- Length: 9.8 miles (15.8 km)

Service
- Frequency: 20 minutes (base), 40 minutes (evenings)
- Weekend frequency: 30 minutes (Saturday), 45 minutes (Sunday), hourly (evenings)
- Daily ridership: 1,282 (average weekday, 2023)
- Timetable: Route 38 schedule

Route 38 is a bus and former subway–surface streetcar route operated by the Southeastern Pennsylvania Transportation Authority (SEPTA) in Philadelphia, Pennsylvania, United States.

== Route description ==
Starting at the Wissahickon Transportation Center, Route 38 crosses the Schuylkill River along City Avenue, winds its way through the River Park neighborhood to Belmont Avenue and the Please Touch Museum in Fairmount Park. Turning southeast, the route continues along Parkside Avenue, 40th Street, Mantua Avenue and Spring Garden Street. After recrossing the Schuylkill River and circling the Philadelphia Museum of Art, the route enters Downtown via Benjamin Franklin Parkway and 20th Street. Buses reach 5th and Market Streets by way of Market and Chestnut Streets, and return on Market Street and JFK Boulevard.

== History ==
=== Streetcar service ===
The original streetcar line ran from Parkside Loop on Parkside Avenue (where it connected with the Fairmount Park trolley) to Market Street and Delaware Avenue (now Columbus Boulevard). On August 7, 1908, streetcars were rerouted into the subway–surface tunnel to Juniper Street station. The line was removed from the subway on October 15, 1955 when the Philadelphia Transportation Company (PTC) opened the new eastbound portion of the subway extension.

=== Bus service ===
Buses replaced trolleys on October 15, 1955, following the original route, but only as far as 33rd and Market Streets. On May 27, 1956, it was extended east along Market Street back to City Hall.

On September 1, 1960, Route 38 was extended north along Belmont Avenue and City Avenue to the Presidential Apartments (at Presidential Boulevard), replacing Route XB. Monday through Saturday express service was added between Center City and Parkside via the Schuylkill Expressway and Girard Avenue. At the same time service was extended four blocks south from Penn Square to Broad and Spruce Streets in Center City.

On June 16, 1963, the route became express-only, with local service via Powelton Village transferred to Route 30. A stop was added at the Bala Cynwyd Shopping Center on January 28, 1973. Express service was eliminated on June 19, 1983, in favor of new local service via the Benjamin Franklin Parkway that replaced the "Cultural Loop" bus.

On June 15, 1986, Route 38 was split into two due to bridge weight restrictions on 34th Street at the Philadelphia Zoo. "Via Zoo" buses ran along Pennsylvania Avenue, 32nd Street and Girard Avenue, while "via Mantua" operated through the residential neighborhood of the same name.

Westbound service through Center City was moved from Chestnut Street to Market Street on June 11, 1989, to allow the reopening of Chestnut to all traffic, back from a transitway. On September 9, 1990, the route was extended across the Schuylkill River to the Wissahickon Transfer Center. The "via Zoo" routing was transferred to Route 76 on May 16, 1993. At the same time, Bala Cynwyd Shopping Center service was also eliminated.

New service to the relocated Please Touch Museum in Fairmount Park was added on November 2, 2008.

On March 23, 2023, SEPTA released a new draft plan for Bus Revolution, SEPTA's bus network redesign. As part of the plan, Route 38 would be cut back to 30th Street Station. The final plan, approved on May 23, 2024, retains the terminal at 5th and Market Streets and reroutes Route 38 to serve 30th Street Station and Mantua before terminating at Ford and Monument Streets in Wynnefield Heights.
