= Millbourne Mills (Pennsylvania) =

Flour mill in Pennsylvania, US

Millbourne Mills Co.
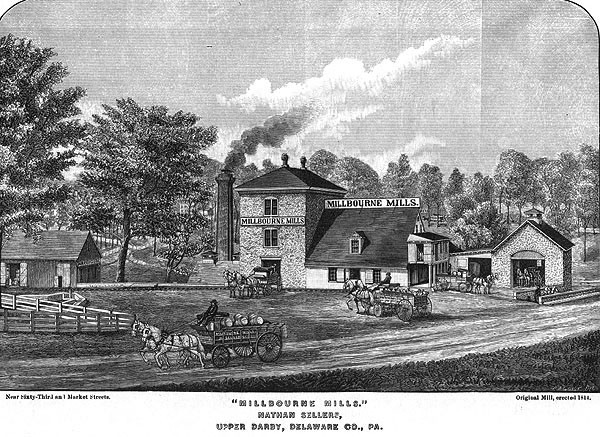
- A depiction of Millbourne Mills by Nathan Sellers
- Industry: Food processing
- Founder: Sellers family
- Defunct: 1927
- Headquarters: Millbourne PA, United States
- Products: Flour
- Brands: King Midas Flour

Millbourne Mills was a flour mill owned by the Sellers family in Upper Darby Township, Pennsylvania, U.S., as well as the name of a former railroad station located there. The Pennsylvania Railroad's Cardington Branch ended there, where interchange was made with the Philadelphia and Western Railroad. Deliveries were also made to the Philadelphia and West Chester Traction Company and to the Philadelphia Rapid Transit Company. No interchange of cars was possible with the latter two railroads due to the difference in rail gauge. The mill produced flour under the King Midas Flour brand.

== History ==
=== Occupation by Samuel Sellers ===
Millbourne Borough was first occupied by Samuel Sellers. The land was used for living and farming for over half a century. His grandson, John Sellers, purchased plots of land in the borough.

Before Sellers' death in 1804, he devised his estates to his sons, Nathan, David, John, and George. Sellers devised a plan of grist and saw-mills to his son John, Jr. These mills were built before 1749.

The mills were owned by the elder Sellers and were operated by James Steel. James continued to operate the mill until 1805 when his son, Thomas Steel, took over.

=== Expansion ===
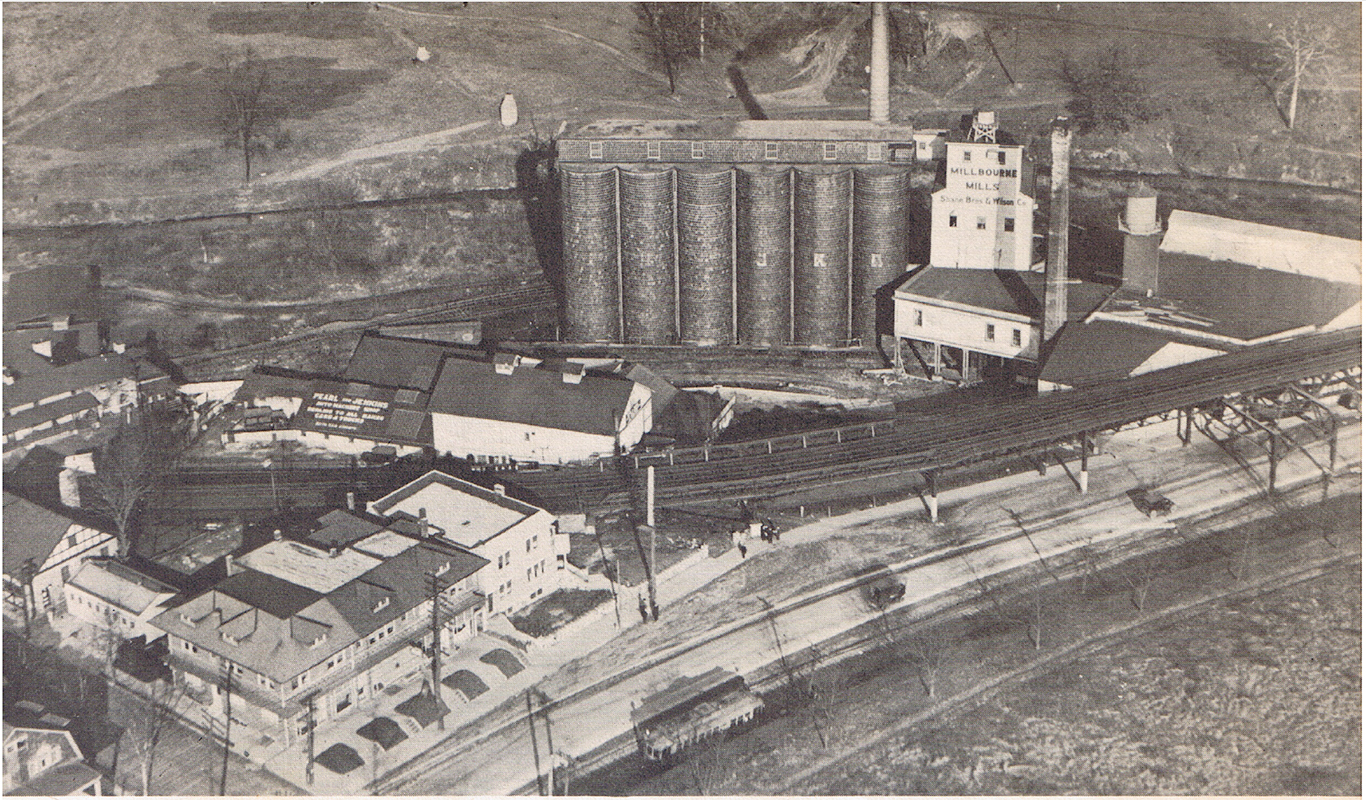
Birdseye view of Millbourne Mills

Thomas Steel purchased the Darby Mill in 1814. In that year, Sellers erected an old part of the now Millbourne Mill. John Jr., after learning the trade of a miller with Thomas Steel, took charge of the new mill.

A stream which empties into the Millbourne dam supplying the water to Millbourne Mills, in 1800, was an oil-mill, which continued until 1848. The old grist-mill stood above the present mill. In 1820, it was used for grinding gypsum. As late as 1830, Augustus C. Jones was operating the old mill in grinding logwood, spices, etc. It was later discontinued. The new mill, built in 1814, was placed under the charge of John Sellers, Jr., and was fitted with all the improved machinery of that time.

=== Early 1900s ===
Fred Shane and George Shane were the owners of Millbourne Mills in the early 1900s. In 1912, the Shane brothers worked with W.J. Wilson to purchase a flour mill in Hastings, Minnesota called Gardner Mills. Although initially successful, the rapid expansion led to the mill's economic difficulties. After its purchase by Wilson and the Shane brothers, Gardner Mills was renamed the King Midas Mill. The name was taken from the brand name of the flour that had been produced at Millbourne Mills.

== Fate ==
Millbourne Mills closed in 1927. A Sears store later occupied the location, which was later torn down. Millbourne exists today as a borough in Delaware County, between Upper Darby Township and the city of Philadelphia. It is served by the Millbourne Station on the SEPTA Market-Frankford Line.
