= William J. McDevitt =

William J. McDevitt is an American legal scholar who is professor emeritus of business law at the Erivan K. Haub School of Business at Saint Joseph's University in Philadelphia.

== Early life and education ==
McDevitt was born in the U.S. He earned a Bachelor of Arts in government from the University of Notre Dame in 1972 and a Juris Doctor from Villanova University School of Law in 1975.

== Career ==
=== Legal ===
While attending law school, McDevitt worked part-time in the Delaware County District Attorney's Office from 1972 to 1974 as a juvenile prosecutor and felony case aide. After his admission to the Pennsylvania bar in 1975, he practised litigation and general business law with Hamilton, Darmopray & Malloy until 1981 and Hepburn, Willcox, Hamilton & Putnam until 1985. He was an associate at Karabel & Morrow in 1985–86 before joining Peck, Young & Van Sant as a partner, where he handled litigation and general business law until 1992.

McDevitt served as an arbitrator for the American Arbitration Association from 1976 to 2004 and NASD Dispute Resolution from 1998 to 2007. He was a member of the Philadelphia Bar Association from 1976 to 2008, serving twice as chair of its Bar Placement Committee. He also served on the board of the Philadelphia Bar Education Center from 1995 to 2001, including as vice president of programming, and was appointed to the board of the Pennsylvania Bar Institute in 2000.

=== Academic ===
McDevitt joined Saint Joseph's University in 1987 as an adjunct lecturer of management in the College of Business and Administration. He became a visiting assistant professor of business law in 1990, joined the tenure-track faculty as an assistant professor in 1991, and was promoted to associate professor in 1999. He retired from full-time teaching in 2019 and was named professor emeritus.

McDevitt directed the university's Law & Court Administration Program from 1991 to 1995 and chaired the Department of Management & International Business from 2000 to 2006. He also served on the University Council and Faculty Senate, including as parliamentarian from 2015 to 2019, and chaired the Academic Honesty Board from 1997 to 2017. He has been a member of the American Association of University Professors since 1997 and held leadership positions in its Saint Joseph's chapter.

=== Community work ===
McDevitt is a founding member and president of Friends of Sellers Hall, a Pennsylvania nonprofit organisation dedicated to preserving Sellers Hall, a 1684 farmhouse in Upper Darby that was listed on the National Register of Historic Places in 2018. He has served as solicitor for the Upper Darby Historical Society since 1989 and was its president from 1993 to 1997. He also served on the board of the Delaware County Historical Society from 1997 to 2001 and wrote a historical study of nineteenth-century Delaware County jurist George Smith.

McDevitt chaired the University of Notre Dame's Alumni Schools Committee for Southeastern Pennsylvania from 1981 to 1991 and served as president of the Notre Dame Alumni Club of Philadelphia from 1979 to 1981. His other community service has included work with Amnesty International's Legal Network, MANNA, and Philabundance.
