= Millbourne, Pennsylvania =

Borough in Pennsylvania, US

Millbourne
- Borough
- Millbourne Borough
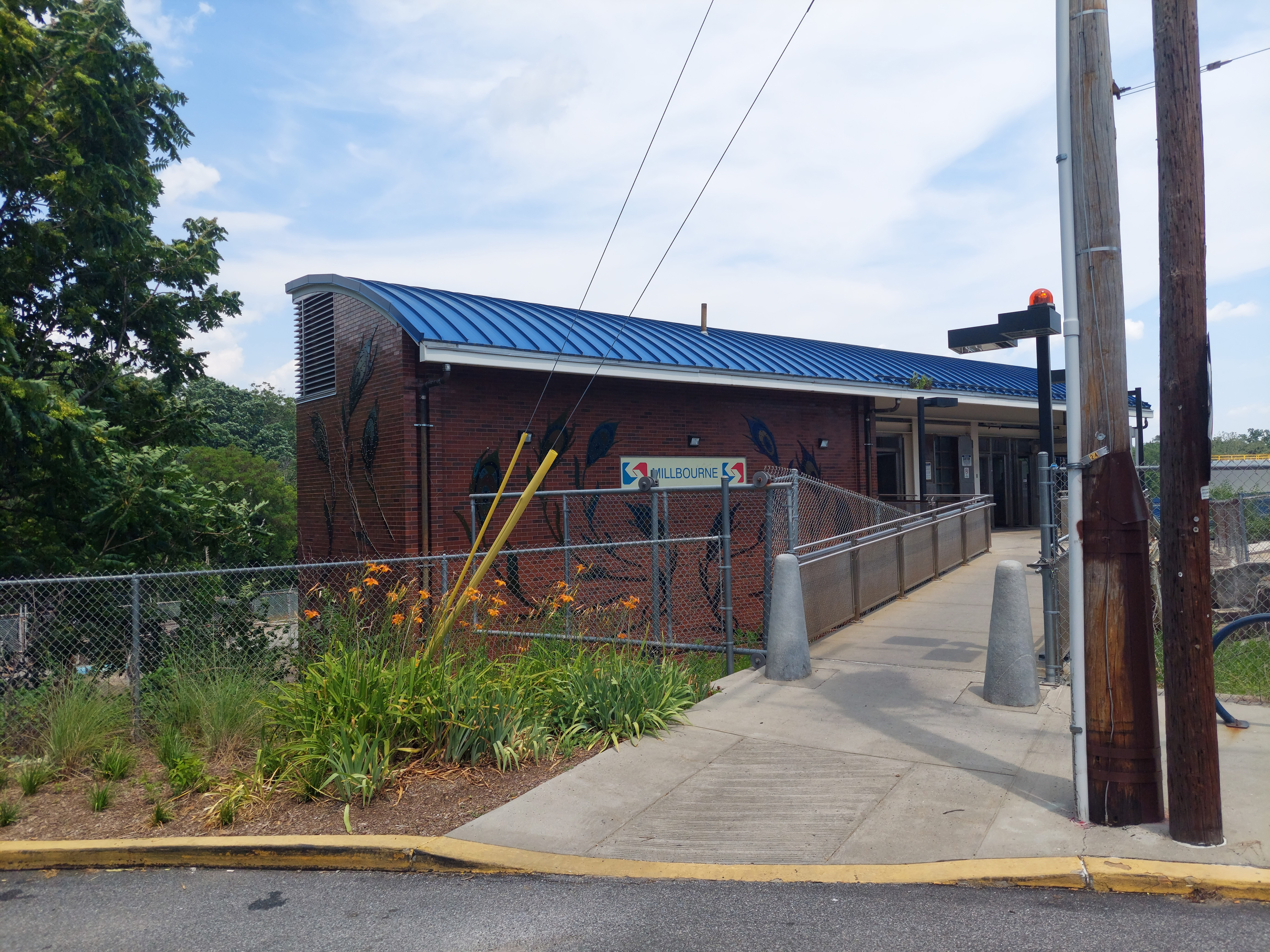
- The Market–Frankford Line in Millbourne

- The location of Millbourne in Delaware County, Pennsylvania (top) and within Pennsylvania (bottom)

- Location in Pennsylvania Location in the United States
- Coordinates: 39°57′48″N 75°15′14″W
- Country: United States
- State: Pennsylvania
- County: Delaware
- First settled: 1682
- Incorporated: 1909
- Founder: Samuel Shoemaker, John L. Fry
- Named for: Millbourne Mills
- Seat: Millbourne Borough Hall

Government
  - Type: Mayor–council government
  - Body: Millbourne Borough Council
  - Mayor: Tayub Mahabubul Alam (D)

Area
  - Total: 0.073 sq mi (0.19 km^{2})
  - Land: 0.073 sq mi (0.19 km^{2})
  - Water: 0 sq mi (0.00 km^{2})
- Elevation: 128 ft (39 m)

Population (2020)
  - Total: 1,212
  - Density: 16,351.7/sq mi (6,313.42/km^{2})
- Demonym: Millbournian
- Time zone: UTC-5 (EST)
  - Summer (DST): UTC-4 (EDT)
- ZIP code: 19082
- Area codes: 610 and 484
- FIPS code: 42-49504
- Website: www.millbourneborough.org

Millbourne Borough (English pronunciation: /ˈmɪːlbəɹn/) is a self-governing municipal borough in Delaware County, Pennsylvania, United States. As of the 2020 census, the population is 1,212. Millbourne borders Philadelphia along Cobbs Creek. The name "Millbourne" comes from the word Mill and "bourne" meaning creek.

Millbourne was settled by Samuel Sellers in 1682. Samuel's descendants later owned a gristmill in Millbourne called Millbourne Mills. In the early 1900s, developers Samuel Shoemaker and John L. Fry developed housing in Millbourne, leading to its separation from Upper Darby and its official incorporation as a borough in 1909. Millbourne Mills shut down in 1926 and was replaced by a Sears, Roebuck & Co. store, which operated until 1988 when it relocated to Upper Darby, causing financial strain on Millbourne. Millbourne was designated a financially distressed municipality in 1998 and was removed from the list in 2014.

Throughout its history, Millbourne has experienced waves of diverse ethnic populations, starting with Greek Americans, followed by East Asian Americans, and currently hosting a significant South Asian American community. Millbourne holds the distinction of having the most concentrated South Asian population in the entire United States. It is also the most densely populated municipality in Pennsylvania.

Millbourne is served by its own SEPTA station known as Millbourne Station. Additionally, the town had its own police department and fire department, both established in 1909. However, the Millbourne Fire Company, which operated the fire department, ceased operations in 2019. In 2022, the former Sears site underwent redevelopment, resulting in the establishment of a logistics facility for the Children's Hospital of Philadelphia.

== History ==
=== First settlement ===
Before the arrival of European settlers, the Lenape people were already in the Delaware Valley. After William Penn's signing of the Treaty of Shackamaxon, Samuel Sellers, the pioneering settler of the Sellers family, came from Derbyshire, England in 1682, with his brother George Sellers. Both brothers purchased two tracts of land totaling 75 acres (30 ha) and 100 acres (40 ha) from William Penn. The official survey for the land was not completed until 1690. Over time, Samuel, his sons, and grandsons expanded their land holdings through additional purchases in the surrounding area. George Sellers later died due to an unexplained death involving a tomahawk.

Samuel Sellers, the original settler, was a skilled weaver who played a pivotal role in the early industrial development of the region. He is credited with establishing the first twisting-mill in America. Building upon his father's legacy, Samuel's son, also named Samuel, and his grandson, John, continued the family tradition of weaving.

=== Millbourne Mills ===
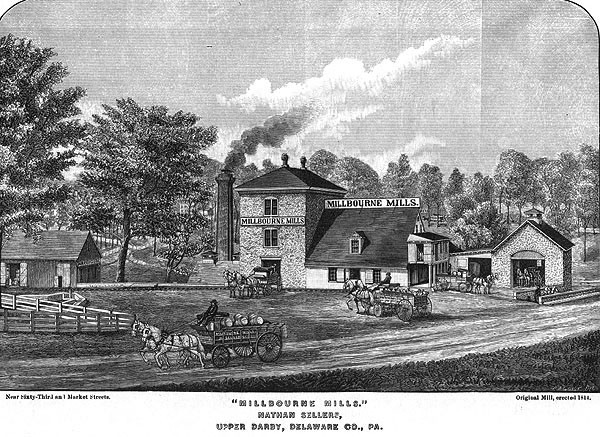
Millbourne Mills was located on present-day 63rd and Market Streets in Millbourne.

The presence of a dam in Millbourne was first documented in an important deed issued by John Sellers on August 27, 1752. John Sellers recognized the potential of harnessing the waterpower of Cobbs Creek, leading to the development of six sites along the waterway. These sites became essential for subsequent generations and contributed to the growth of Millbourne Mills, first called Sellers Mills.

During this time, Millbourne was part of Darby Township. But in 1786, Millbourne was separated with other municipalities to form Upper Darby Township.

Following John Sellers' passing in 1804, his estate was inherited by his sons, with George receiving the majority of Millbourne. John Sellers II inherited the grist and sawmills, which were already established before 1749. Millbourne Mills were initially operated by James Steel under the ownership of John Sellers Sr., and later by Thomas Steel, who took over in 1805.

In 1814, Thomas Steel acquired the Darby Mills and relocated, while John Sellers II. expanded the existing mill, resulting in the construction of the original section. John Sellers also owned a tannery on the Wayside farm in 1782. Additionally, an oil mill operated near the dam supplying water to Millbourne Mills until 1848.

The original gristmill underwent changes over time until its discontinuation. The new mill, built in 1814, was managed by John Sellers II. and featured advanced machinery. It achieved significant grain production, including wheat, rye, corn, buckwheat, and oats.

The mill underwent expansions and upgrades, including a four-story addition in 1868. It utilized a turbine wheel and later incorporated auxiliary steam power. John Sellers II died in 1878, and his sons continued operating Millbourne Mills with Thomas Steel. Millbourne Mills produced 250 barrels of Millbourne branded flour daily, with substantial wheat purchases and flour production in subsequent years.

=== 20th century ===
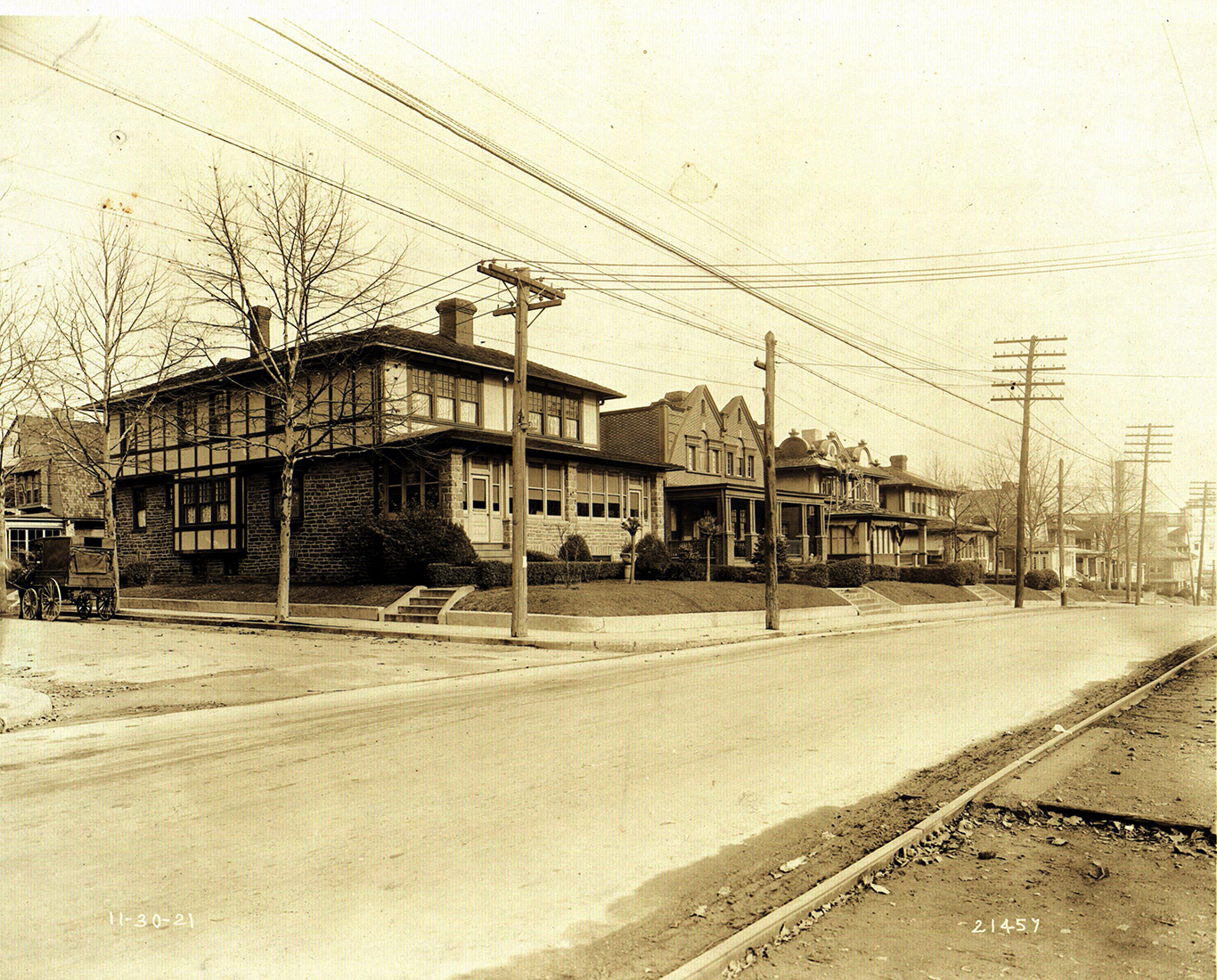
Millbourne homes built along Market Street (formerly West Chester Pike)

In 1906, a patch of Millbourne was sold by John Sellers II's son, John, to make way for 69th Street Transportation Center, which connected Upper Darby to Philadelphia.

During the early spring of 1907 and throughout 1908, a considerable amount of construction took place on the hill west of Millbourne Mills, situated on West Chester Pike. Builders Samuel Shoemaker and John L. Fry, seeing a commercial opportunity, undertook the development of a suburban community featuring semi-detached homes. Upon completion, the properties boasted landscaped lawns, while the streets and sidewalks lined with trees. The location offered transportation options. The properties sold, with many units being purchased prior to their completion. Consequently, the homes attracted respectable businessmen and their families, leading to the establishment of a growing community.

In 1909, Judge Issac Johnson of Delaware County issued an opinion that allowed for the incorporation of Millbourne as a borough within Upper Darby Township. The exceptions raised during the proceedings were subsequently dismissed. Attorneys representing the petitioners, who included a significant portion of the community, prepared a decree in accordance with the judge's opinion. Millbourne became the fourth borough to be formed in the township, joining Clifton Heights, Lansdowne, and Aldan at the time. The Millbourne Fire Company and the Millbourne Police Department opened shortly after.

The Philadelphia Rapid Transit Company (PRT, now SEPTA) opened a rapid transit station in Millbourne on March 4, 1907.

In 1910, Millbourne Mills was sold to the Shane Brothers and continued to produce flour until 1921. Millbourne Mills ceased operations in 1926 and was demolished to make way for a Sears Roebuck & Co. store.

Millbourne students would attend schools in the Millbourne School District but in 1971, Millbourne merged with other municipalities to form the Upper Darby School District.

==== Financially distressed municipality ====
The Sears Roebuck & Co. store operated from 1926 until 1988. The owner of the property Morris Willner, president of Willner Realty and Development Co., announced in April 1988 that Sears would move from Millbourne to a former Gimbel's Department Store in 69th Street in Upper Darby. After the move, Millbourne continued to collect parking fees from the former Sears parking lot. But in May 1990, Willner announced that Millbourne was no longer permitted to collect fees. There was plans to develop a discount supply store, but the company went bankrupt before plans could be arranged. The former Sears site was demolished in the 2000s.

During the early 1980s, Millbourne had the highest crime rate in all of Delaware County. In 1989, The Millbourne Fire Company was temporarily closed due to budget problems. After years of negotiations, The Millbourne Fire Company reopened in 1992.

After the relocation of Sears, Millbourne went into financial hardship. By the 1990s, due to mismanagement of borough funds, Millbourne was on the brink of bankruptcy. To receive enough funds to stay afloat, Millbourne had to be designated as a financially distressed municipality by the state of Pennsylvania, be absorbed back into Upper Darby, or contract municipal services within Millbourne out to Upper Darby Township.

Millbourne was designated a financially distressed municipality on January 7, 1993, by the state of Pennsylvania. Factors that led to a distress determination included revenue loss created from the closure of Sears and an evaluation by the Pennsylvania Department of Community and Economic Development. Fairmount Capital Advisors Inc., hired by the state of Pennsylvania, presented a five-year plan to recover Millbourne. The plan included:

- reducing the numbers of officials in Millbourne council;
- hiring a borough manager;
- establishing a business office and a civil service commission;
- acquiring market-rate, tax-exempt bond financing to finance bank debt, and raise capital for infrastructure repair; and
- improving financial management with new computer systems.

Susana Smith of Bloomfield, New Jersey was hired as the borough manager. Taxes for homeowners in Millbourne rose between 1993 and 2014. A 40% increase in real-estate taxes in the 1995 preliminary budget was adopted by Millbourne due to the distress determination.

=== 21st Century ===
In the 2000s, Millbourne was still designated as a financially distressed municipality. Since the 1970s, Millbourne has seen a notable rise in its South Asian population. Following the events of the September 11th attacks, Sikh New York cab drivers, relocated to Millbourne in order to seek safety from instances of hate crimes. Millbourne gradually became a secure haven for the expanding Sikh community due to its appealing amenities and the presence of a gurdwara. Millbourne became known as a "Little India."

In 2009, under the leadership of mayor Thomas Kramer, Millbourne enacted land value tax. Millbourne began imposing taxes on the land itself and not on the structures built there. This allowed Millbourne to raise the necessary funds to stay afloat. The former Sears lot became the largest source of revenue for Millbourne. On October 21, 2014, Millbourne was removed from the financially distressed municipality list. Millbourne had not overspent its budget in 5 years and even went as far as to use goats to remove weeds. The South Asian population in Millbourne continued to rise. In 2019, The Millbourne Fire Company closed indefinitely. In 2022, the former Sears site was developed and a Service and Logistics facility for the Children's Hospital of Philadelphia opened.

== Geography ==
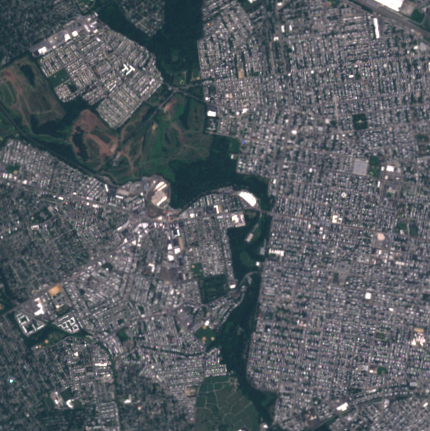
Sentinel-2 true-color image of Millbourne (center), West Philadelphia (right), and Upper Darby (left), June 2022

=== Topography ===
Millbourne is located at 39°57′48″N 75°15′14″W (39.963735, -75.252615).

Millbourne has a total area of 0.074 square miles (0.19 km^{2}), making it the smallest municipality in Delaware County by area. Millbourne is bounded on the north and east by Cobbs Creek, and on the south by Market Street. Across Cobbs Creek to the north lies an extension of Fairmount Park and the Cobbs Creek Golf Course. Millbourne is situated within the Darby Creek Watershed.

==== Parks and recreation ====
===== Cobbs Creek =====
A common place of interest, Cobbs Creek is located near Millbourne. The creek is commonly used for swimming and fishing. The creek is also connected to the Cobbs Creek trail which is used for hiking and biking. The Cobbs Creek Bikeway runs from a corner at the eastern end of Millbourne, 63rd and Market Streets, to approximately 86th and Cobbs Creek Parkway. It is used by walkers and bicyclists as well as occasional all-terrain vehicles.

===== Wister Drive Park =====
A small playground for children is located at the end of Wister Drive. Improvements for the park began in 2012, which included new playground equipment, paid for by a $14,000 ($17,845 in 2022) Community Development Block Grant.

=== Boroughscape ===
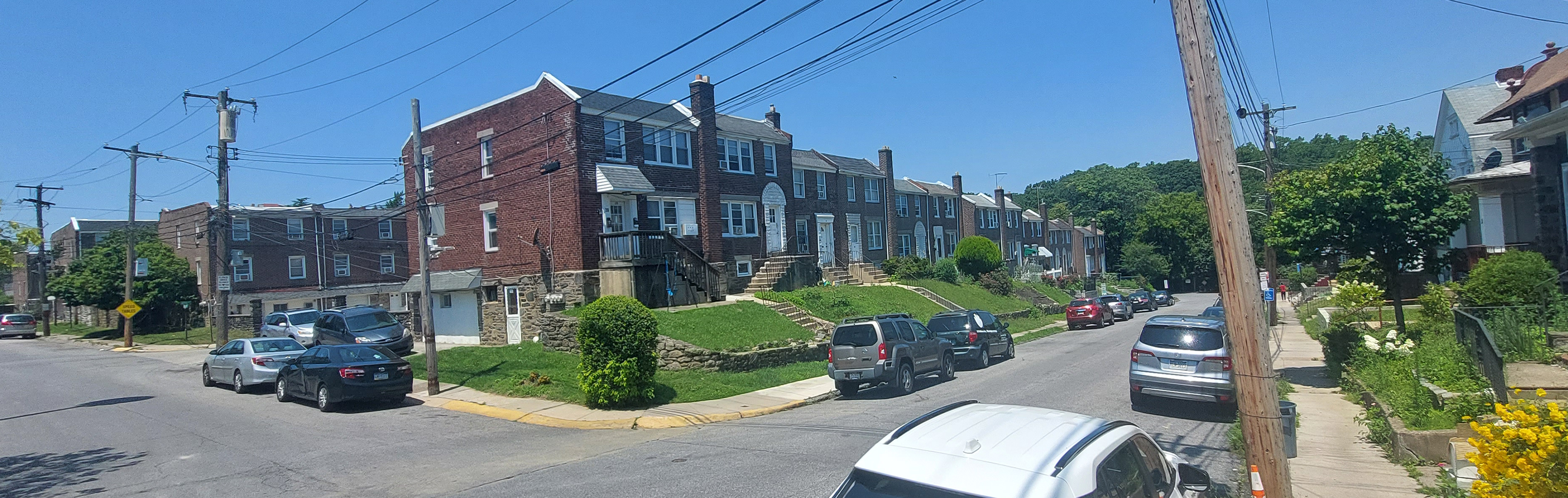
View of homes in Millbourne at Garden Court and Sellers Avenue in 2023.

==== Planning ====
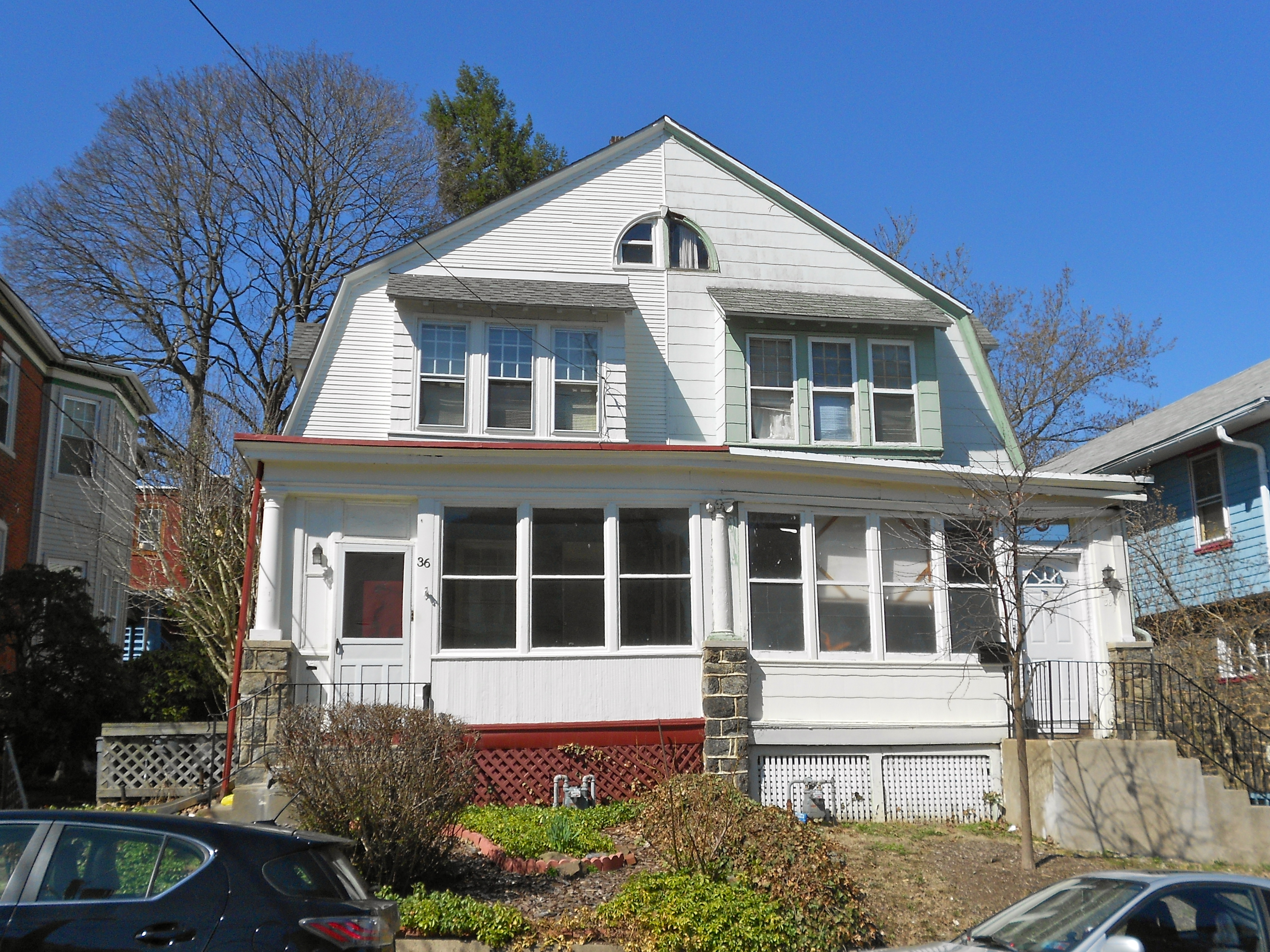
A house in Millbourne built during the early 20th century.

Housing construction in Millbourne began in the 1900s. Founders Samuel Shoemaker and John L. Fry identified a real estate opportunity and embarked on the development of homes to meet the growing demand. During this period, 100 multifamily semi-detached homes were built, extending from the east to Sellers Avenue. In the 1950s, new elevated townhomes were introduced and known as "Millbourne Gardens." Around 60% of Millbourne's population resides within this residential area.

==== Architecture ====
Millbourne features a diverse range of architectural styles, with 14 different styles represented among its homes. The residential area of Millbourne is in a secluded location. In Millbourne, the predominant materials used in the construction of homes were bricks and hardwood. These materials were favored due to their aesthetic appeal.

=== Climate ===
On the Köppen climate classification, Millbourne has a Humid subtropical climate (Cfa). Millbourne has warm-wet summers and very cold-snowy winters. The temperature usually varies from 26 °F (-3 °C) to 86 °F (30 °C) and is rarely below 13 °F (-10 °C) or above 94 °F (34 °C).

The hottest month of the year is July with an average high of above 77 °F (25 °C). The coldest month of the year is January with an average high of below 49 °F (9 °C).

A wet day in Millbourne is defined as having at least 0.04 inches (0.10 cm) of liquid or liquid-equivalent precipitation. The frequency of wet days varies throughout the year, with the wetter season lasting 4.9 months from March 31 to August 28, where there is a greater than 29% chance of a given day being wet. July is the month with the highest number of wet days in Millbourne, averaging 11.1 days with at least 0.04 inches (0.10 cm) of precipitation. On the other hand, the drier season lasts 7.1 months from August 28 to March 31, with January having the fewest wet days, averaging 7.1 days. Among the wet days, rain alone is the most common form of precipitation, occurring throughout the year, with July having the highest number of rainy days, averaging 11.1. The peak probability of rain alone is 37% on July 29.

Millbourne measures snowfall accumulated over a 31-day period centered around each day of the year, showing significant seasonal variation. The snowy period spans 4.3 months from November 21 to March 30, with a minimum sliding 31-day snowfall of 1 inch (2.5 cm). February receives the highest snowfall in Millbourne, averaging 16 cm or 6.3 in. Conversely, the snowless period covers 7.7 months from March 30 to November 21, with August 1 experiencing the least snow, averaging 0 inches (0 cm) of total accumulation.

Climate data for Millbourne (Philadelphia area) (1991–2020 normals)
Month	Jan	Feb	Mar	Apr	May	Jun	Jul	Aug	Sep	Oct	Nov	Dec	Year
Mean daily maximum °F (°C)	41.3 (5.2)	44.3 (6.8)	52.8 (11.6)	64.7 (18.2)	74.4 (23.6)	83.2 (28.4)	87.8 (31.0)	85.8 (29.9)	78.9 (26.1)	67.2 (19.6)	55.9 (13.3)	46.0 (7.8)	65.2 (18.5)
Daily mean °F (°C)	26.0 (−3.3)	27.5 (−2.5)	34.3 (1.3)	44.3 (6.8)	54.2 (12.3)	63.9 (17.7)	69.6 (20.9)	67.9 (19.9)	69.9 (21.1)	58.2 (14.6)	38.8 (3.8)	31.2 (−0.4)	48.8 (9.3)
Mean daily minimum °F (°C)	33.7 (0.9)	35.9 (2.2)	43.6 (6.4)	54.5 (12.5)	64.3 (17.9)	73.5 (23.1)	78.7 (25.9)	76.8 (24.9)	60.9 (16.1)	49.2 (9.6)	47.4 (8.6)	38.6 (3.7)	54.8 (12.6)
Average precipitation inches (mm)	3.13 (80)	2.75 (70)	3.96 (101)	3.47 (88)	3.34 (85)	4.04 (103)	4.38 (111)	4.29 (109)	4.40 (112)	3.47 (88)	2.91 (74)	3.97 (101)	44.11 (1,122)
Average snowfall inches (cm)	7.1 (18)	8.4 (21)	3.6 (9.1)	0.3 (0.76)	0.0 (0.0)	0.0 (0.0)	0.0 (0.0)	0.0 (0.0)	0.0 (0.0)	0.0 (0.0)	0.2 (0.51)	3.5 (8.9)	23.1 (58.27)
Source: NOAA

== Demographics ==
Millbourne, Pennsylvania – Racial and ethnic composition Note: the US Census treats Hispanic/Latino as an ethnic category. This table excludes Latinos from the racial categories and assigns them to a separate category. Hispanics/Latinos may be of any race.
Race / Ethnicity (NH = Non-Hispanic)	Pop 2000	Pop 2010	Pop 2020	% 2000	% 2010	% 2020
White alone (NH)	176	119	82	18.66%	10.27%	6.77%
Black or African American alone (NH)	157	230	241	16.65%	19.84%	19.88%
Native American or Alaska Native alone (NH)	1	6	0	0.11%	0.52%	0.00%
Asian alone (NH)	509	649	766	53.98%	56.00%	63.20%
Native Hawaiian or Pacific Islander alone (NH)	0	7	2	0.00%	0.60%	0.17%
Other race alone (NH)	4	2	17	0.42%	0.17%	1.40%
Mixed race or Multiracial (NH)	39	47	25	4.14%	4.06%	2.06%
Hispanic or Latino (any race)	57	99	79	6.04%	8.54%	6.52%
Total	943	1,159	1,212	100.00%	100.00%	100.00%

Historical population
Census	Pop.	Note	%±
1910	322		—
1920	418		29.8%
1930	396		−5.3%
1940	393		−0.8%
1950	901		129.3%
1960	793		−12.0%
1970	637		−19.7%
1980	652		2.4%
1990	831		27.5%
2000	943		13.5%
2010	1,159		22.9%
2020	1,212		4.6%

=== Census Statistics ===
==== Census 2020 ====
As of the 2020 Census, the racial makeup of Millbourne was 7.1% White, 20% African American, 0.1% Native American, 63.2% Asian, 0.2% Native Hawaiian and Other Pacific Islander, 6.2% from other races, and 3.3% from two or more races. Hispanic or Latino of any race is 6.5% of the population. 63.8% of Millbourne's population were foreign-born.

There are 346 households, out of which 24.3% had children under the age of 18 living with them, 63.6% were married couples living together, 10.4% had a female householder with no spouse present, and 24% had a male householder with no spouse present. The average family size is 3.64.

In Millbourne, 24.3% of the population was under the age of 18, 75.7% 18 years of age or older and 9% was 65 years of age or older. The median age was 31 years.

==== Census 2010 ====
In Census 2010, the racial makeup of Millbourne was 13.7% White, 20.1% African American, 0.6% Native American, 56.3% Asian, 0.9% Native Hawaiian and Other Pacific Islander, 4.1% from other races, and 4.2% from two or more races. Hispanic or Latino of any race were 8.5% of the population. 56.5% of Millbourne's population was foreign-born.

==== Census 2000 ====
In Census 2000, there were 943 people, 366 households, and 214 families residing in Millbourne. The population density was 16,557 inhabitants per square mile (6,393/km^{2}). There were 420 housing units at an average density of 6,123.7 per square mile (2,364.4/km^{2}). The racial makeup of Millbourne was 21.31% White, 17.18% African American, 0.21% Native American, 54.29% Asian, 2.55% from other races, and 4.45% from two or more races. Hispanic or Latino of any race were 6.04% of the population.

=== Cultural diversity ===
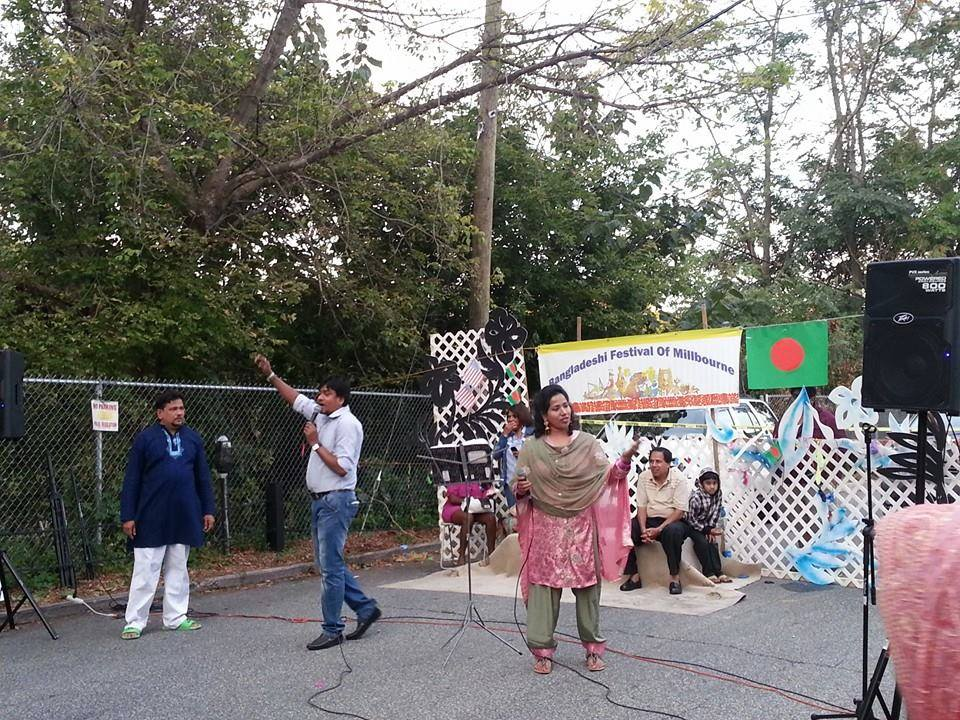
A Bangladeshi Festival in Millbourne

In the 1980s, Millbourne had a majority of Greek Americans and East Asians. Since the 2000s, Millbourne has been considered the first municipality in Pennsylvania with a Desi majority. Millbourne is often called a "Little India" due to this large Indian presence. Most residents stay for a few years before moving to other places, after they become financially stable.

The increase in the South Asian population in Millbourne can be attributed to the migration of Sikh cab drivers from New York following the September 11th attacks. Seeking refuge from potential hate crimes targeting their use of turbans, as well as drawn by Millbourne's economic opportunities. Another contributing factor to the rise in the South Asian population in Millbourne is the presence of relatives already living in the area, allowing for family reunification.

=== Religion ===
Millbourne and the surrounding area of Upper Darby host a variety of religious congregations, reflecting the religious diversity of its residents. In close proximity, there are approximately 16 churches, temples, and mosques, representing different faiths and serving the community. For instance, the Philadelphia Sikh Society, Philadelphia Korean Baptist Church, Sree Narayana Guru Deva Temple, and Ethiopian Evangelical Church of Philadelphia are among the diverse religious institutions catering to the needs of residents in Millbourne.

==== Philadelphia Sikhi Society ====
The Philadelphia Sikhi Society is a gurdwara located on Garden Court. Since the 1990s, it has been Millbourne's only place of worship. It was founded after a small Sikh population in Philadelphia used a storefront as their place of worship until the 1990s when more Sikh immigrants arrived. The growing population required a larger space, so they purchased an old warehouse in Millbourne and transformed it into a new gurdwara. The Sikh temple's move to Millbourne led to a significant increase in the population. The gurdwara offers prayer services every Sunday and Friday. Annually, the Philadelphia Sikhi Society holds a Sikh Guru Nanak parade in celebration of the founder of Sikhism, Guru Nanak. In 2011, the gurdwara raised relief funds for the 2011 Tōhoku earthquake and tsunami. Around 1,500 Sikhs in the Millbourne visit the gurdwara.

=== Languages ===
According to the 2020 Census, 73.4% of Millbourne's population spoke a language other than English at home. 26.6% of households only spoke English, 2.3% spoke Spanish, 49.9% spoke an Indo-European language, 12.7% spoke an Asian and Pacific Islander language, and 8.4% spoke another language.

== Government ==
=== Politics ===
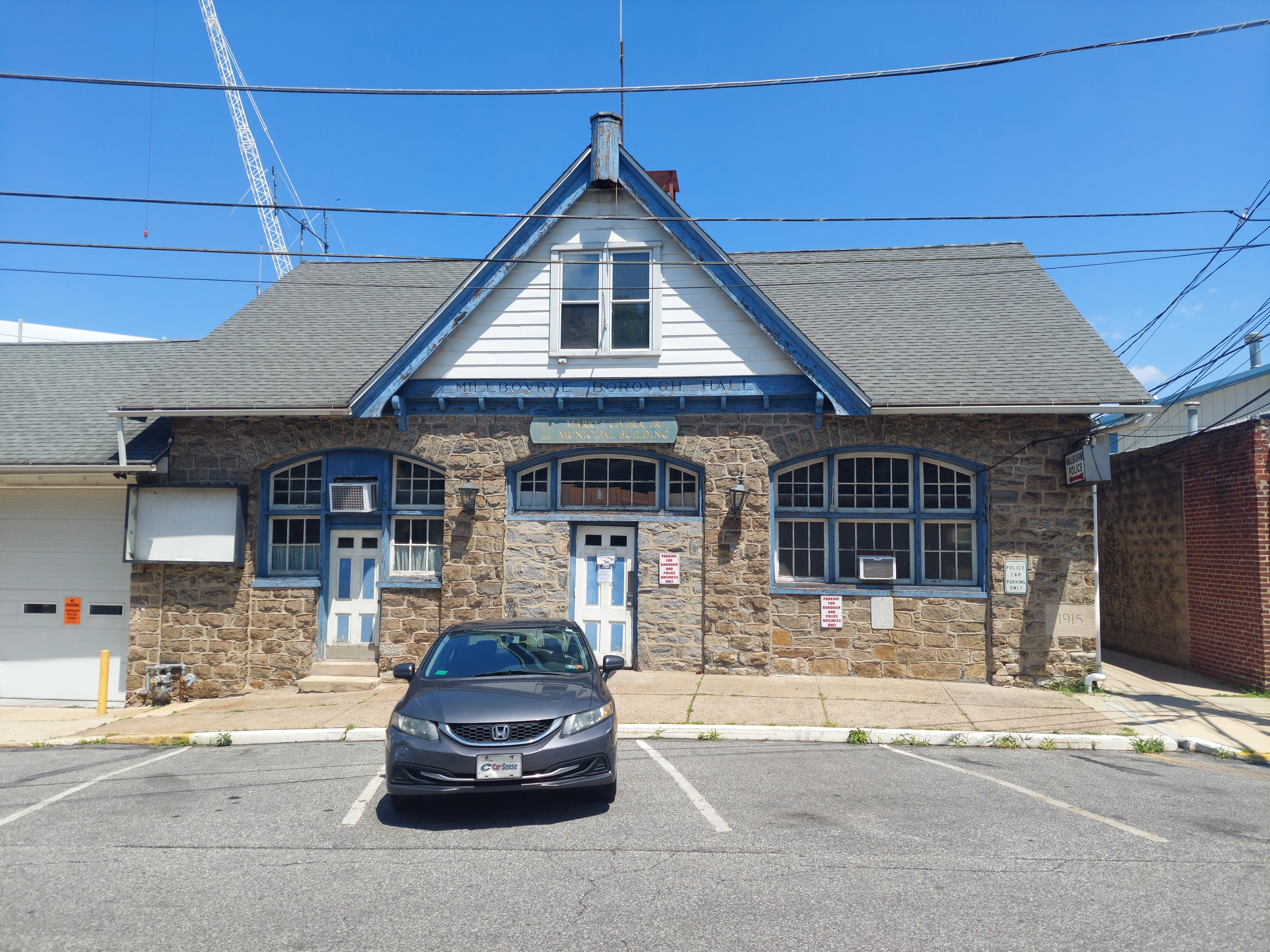
Millbourne Borough Hall serves as a central location for various government activities.

Millbourne is within District 5 of Pennsylvania's Congressional Districts, District 164 of the Pennsylvania House of Representatives, and in District 26 of the Pennsylvania State Senate.

==== Political shift ====
For decades, Millbourne was a Republican majority. But due to the large arrival of immigrants, Millbourne became Democratic. Joseph Artmont Sr., former Republican mayor of Millbourne, and his son Joseph Artmont Jr., and their political allies were replaced. Over the course of the 2000s, the composition of the council gradually changed, with Thomas Kramer being the sole remaining Republican member. Later on, Kramer underwent a political realignment and joined the Democratic Party, subsequently running in the 2009 general elections and securing a victory. Kramer won 126 to 58 from then mayor William Donovan Jr. Under the Kramer administration, Millbourne enacted new taxing laws, improved aging infrastructure, and removed itself from the financially distressed municipality list.

=== Public safety ===
==== Millbourne Police Department ====
The Millbourne Police Department was founded in 1909. Millbourne maintains its own police department, which provides frequent coverage of each street. Millbourne had an unreliable relationship with its police department in the early 1950s due to Millbourne's civil service laws being "carelessly" administered, according to the Delaware County Daily Times. Police officers in the police department were also the lowest paid officers in Delaware County. Since then, tensions between two parties have been resolved. During the early 1980s, Millbourne had the highest crime rate in all of Delaware County. Since then, crime has lowered, with exceptions in the rise of larceny.

Millbourne has a Town Watch, a volunteer organization run in cooperation with the police department. The Town Watch was formed after Upper Darby officials urged nearby residents to form neighborhood watch groups in 2011. Magisterial courts with presiding jurisdiction for Millbourne are located in Upper Darby.

==== Millbourne Fire Company ====
The Millbourne Fire Company was founded in 1909 and provided Millbourne with firefighting services until its closure in 2019. Upper Darby Township Fire Company, the East Lansdowne Fire Company and the Yeadon Fire Company now service Millbourne.

===== 1990s Finance Issues =====
In October 1989, the Millbourne Fire Company temporarily ceased operations due to insufficient funds for insurance. However, an extension was granted by the insurance company after Millbourne Borough could not afford the insurance premiums. To ensure fire protection, Millbourne Borough voting to contract services with Upper Darby Township, replacing the volunteer-run fire company with a paid one. The Millbourne Fire Company disputed Millbourne Borough's decision and was shut down again due to lack of funds. In response to the challenge, Delaware County Judge John Diggins ordered a referendum. On May 16, 1990, Residents were presented with the following question in the referendum: "Do you support the replacement of the Volunteer Fire Company with a paid fire company in the Borough of Millbourne?" Subsequently, the referendum was held, and the results revealed that 66 individuals voted in favor of the replacement, whereas 76 individuals voted against it. Millbourne Fire Company was allowed to stay and Millbourne Borough was ordered to pay $12,000 ($2,688 in 2022) for funding.

The Millbourne Fire Company only received $500 ($1,120 in 2022) both in July and August 1990. Millbourne Borough appealed the Diggins decision, and the Commonwealth Court of Pennsylvania reversed the decision. The Millbourne Fire Company attempted to appeal to the Supreme Court of Pennsylvania but was rejected on March 11, 1992. On October 1, 1992, after Millbourne Borough presented Millbourne Fire Company with $4,200 ($8,759 in 2022) in funding, Millbourne Fire Company finally reopened after over 2 years of closure.

===== 2019 Closure =====
On April 23, 2019, in a meeting, ten members unanimously voted to close the Millbourne Fire Company after 110 years of service. Fire Chief Joseph Artmont Jr. and President Andy Formanes were elected to handle any remaining tasks. Failed negotiations with Millbourne Borough led to the closure, and the firehouse has been locked with agreements of sale on two fire trucks.

The Millbourne Fire Company issued a letter addressing misinformation and outlining issues between Millbourne Fire Company and Millbourne Borough. They had requested funding for part-time paid firefighters, but the proposals were rejected. The department faced challenges due to a shortage of volunteers and insufficient resources. The closure leaves Millbourne relying on neighboring fire departments for coverage.

== Economy ==
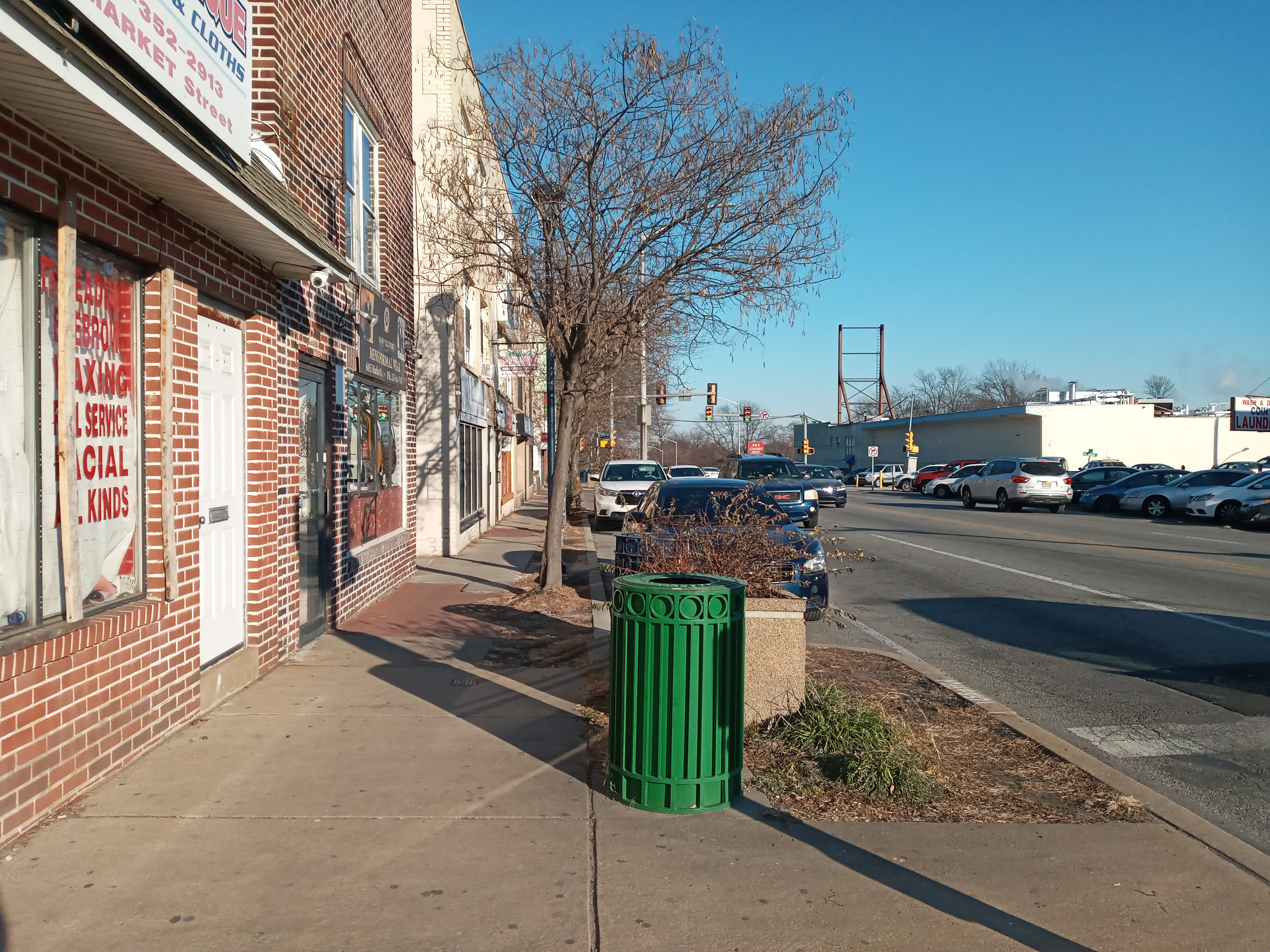
Local shops in Millbourne alongside Market Street

Millbourne relied on property taxes from a Sears store but faced financial hardship after its closure in 1988. Mismanagement of funds pushed Millbourne towards bankruptcy. The state of Pennsylvania designated Millbourne as financially distressed in 1993 and hired Fairmount Capital Advisors Inc. for a recovery plan. Taxes increased for homeowners. In the 2000s, Millbourne implemented a land value tax, generating revenue from the land itself. The former Sears lot became a major income source. On October 21, 2014, Millbourne was removed from the distressed list.

In 2012, a development plan was created for the vacant 18 acres (7.3 ha) plot of land that originally hosted Sears. It included multiple retail stores and anchors, housing units and apartments, and new townhall. Due to the property lying within the Cobb's Creek floodplain and being located in a disadvantaged area, the plan was scrapped. On October 7, 2022, after 7 years of planning, the Children's Hospital of Philadelphia opened a logistics facility at the former Sears lot. With the arrival of the new facility, Delaware Country reassessed the site's value at $50.6 million.

According to the 2020 Census, The median income for a household in Millbourne was $45,800, and the median income for a family was $44,732. The per capita income for Millbourne was $15,752. About 7.8% of families and 10.9% of the population were below the poverty line, including 9.0% of those under age 18 and 16.9% of those age 65 or over. In Millbourne, the top three industries residents over the age of 16 are employed in include retail trade, recreation and food services, and administrative and waste management.

=== Grants ===
Throughout the years, Millbourne has received grants to improve infrastructure. This included grants to improve the heart of Millbourne, local recycling and leaf collection programs, develop the Service and Logistics Center for the Children's Hospital of Philadelphia, and for planning around Millbourne Station to attract new businesses.

== Education ==
=== Millbourne School District ===
In the 1950s, students in Millbourne would attend East Lansdowne Elementary School and Aldan High School under the Millbourne School District. In the late 1960s, Delaware County began reorganizing its school districts under the school consolidation act. The Millbourne School District, including Newtown and Marcus Hook, was planned to merge with Upper Darby and Clifton Heights school districts. Millbourne appealed the decision to the Pennsylvania Supreme Court, wanting to be independent and send students to other schools on a tuition basis. Millbourne lost that appeal but was granted a tax reduction. The Millbourne School District shut down in 1971 and was merged with other municipalities to form the Upper Darby School District.

=== Upper Darby School District ===
Today, K-12 students attend Upper Darby School District schools. Kindergarteners attend the Upper Darby Kindergarten Center. Grades 1–5 attend Charles Kelly Elementary School. Grades 6–8 attend Beverly Hills Middle School. Grades 9–12 attend Upper Darby High School. The Kindergarten Center, Charles Kelly Elementary School, and the Upper Darby High School all provide bus transportation to students in Millbourne.

=== Census Statistics ===
According to the 2020 Census, 30.2% of Millbourne's population has a bachelor's degree or higher. 19% have a high school or equivalent degree, 20.3% attended some college with no degree, 3.8% have an associate degree, 18.5% have a bachelor's degree, and 11.7% have a graduate or professional degree.

Around 64.4% of students in Millbourne are enrolled in K-12 schools. 7.7% are enrolled in preschool, 21.5% are enrolled in undergraduate colleges, and 6.4% are enrolled in graduate professional schools.

== Culture ==
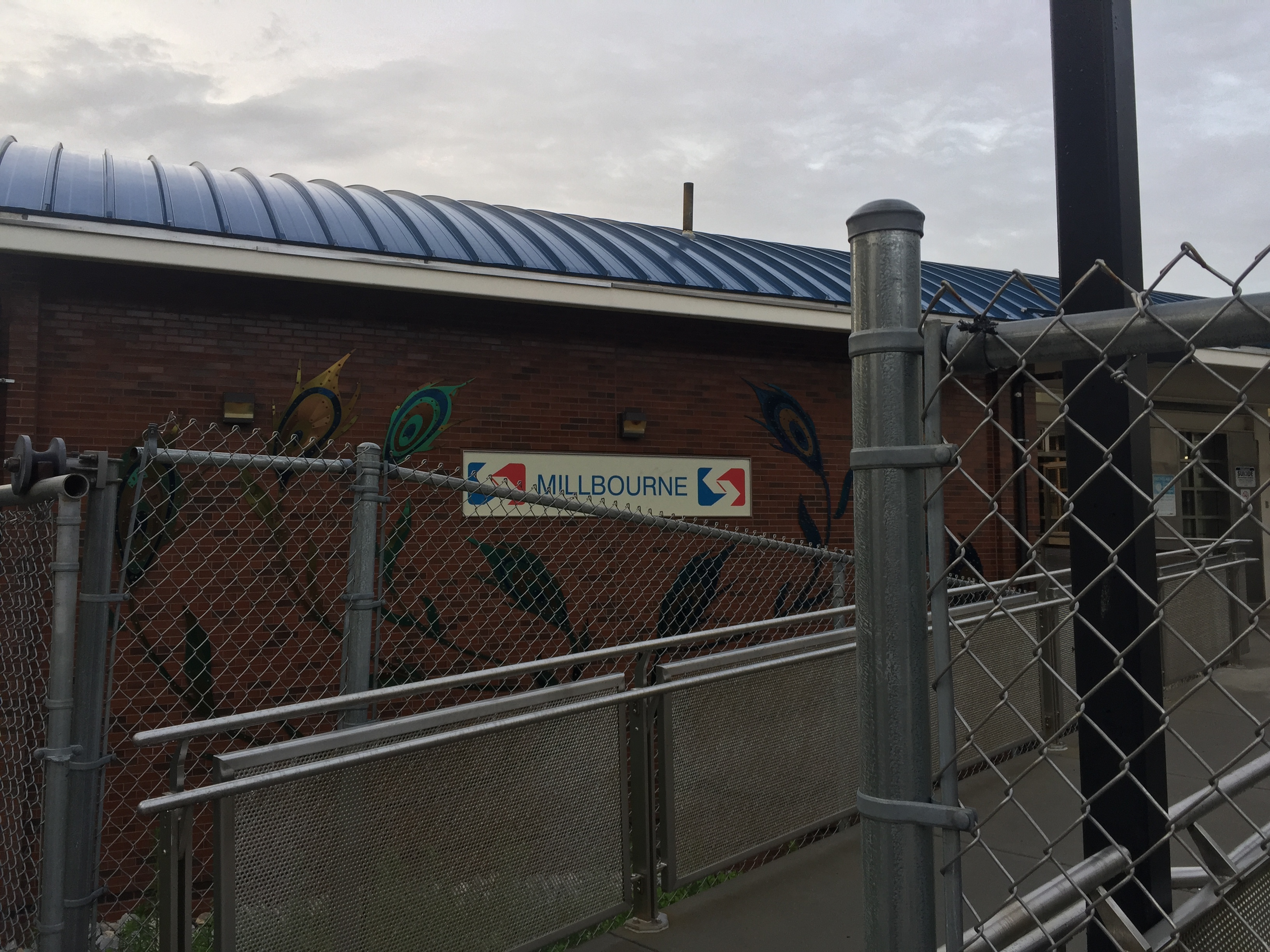
Millbourne Station decorated with iridescent peacock feathers

=== Art ===
Millbourne Station is decorated with metal iridescent peacock feathers. The project, designed by Erland + Kaman in 2009, is called "Paradise." It is an homage to the diverse culture of Millbourne and its people from the Indian sub-continent. There is a community-made mural located next to Millbourne station via a narrow passageway, depicting Millbourne and its residents. The mural project was sponsored by City Year in 2008.

=== Food ===
Although Millbourne does not have it its own cuisine, myriad ethnic grocery stores and restaurants are available in Millbourne. The stretch from Millbourne to Upper Darby offers a diverse culinary experience for the South Asian residents in the area. Within a close proximity, several Indian, Bengali, and Punjabi grocery stores provide access to fresh produce.

== Media ==
=== Newspapers ===
Millbourne does not have its own daily newspaper but is broadly covered by The Delaware County Daily Times and The Philadelphia Inquirer.

=== Radio ===
Millbourne has access to the same radio channels as those received in the Philadelphia metropolitan area. As of 2023, Millbourne receives 22 AM and 52 FM stations.

=== Television ===
Millbourne has access to the same television channels as those received in the Philadelphia metropolitan area. Millbourne was a subject in WPVI-TV's Visions 2011 for its Indian majority. An episode of Postcards from Buster titled Philadelphia Masala was set in Millbourne, and was aimed to educate children on Sikh culture.

== Infrastructure ==
=== Transportation ===
==== Roads ====
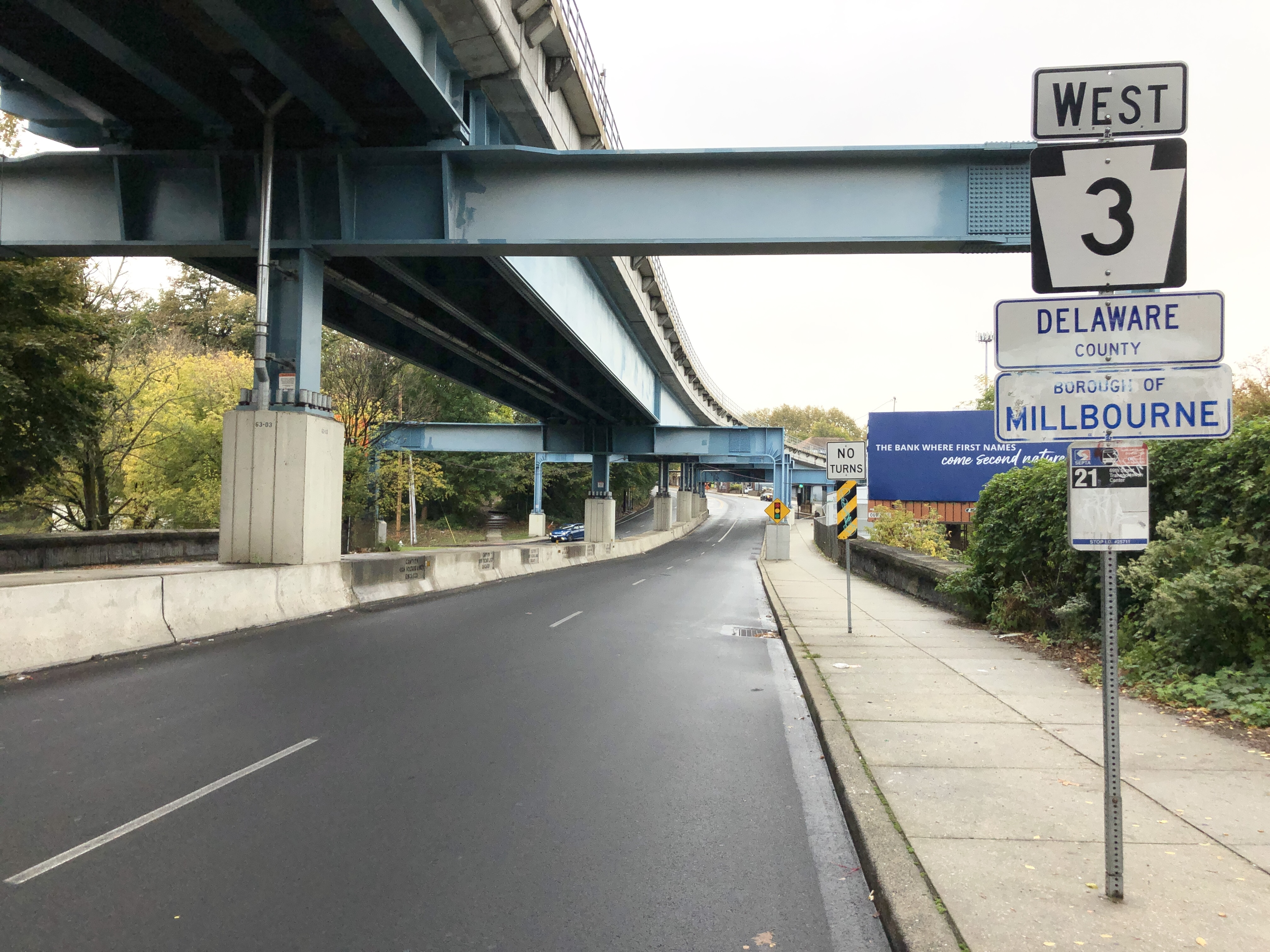
PA 3 westbound entering Millbourne

As of 2013, there was 1.00 mile (1.61 km) of public roads in Millbourne, all of which was maintained by Millbourne. Pennsylvania Route 3 is the only numbered highway serving Millbourne, acting as Millbourne's southern border. The Millbourne section of Pennsylvania Route 3 was formally called West Chester Pike and was later changed to Market Street to align with the same street in Philadelphia.

Roads within Millbourne are maintained by the Millbourne council. Residents within Millbourne pay for parking permits. There are also parking meters located alongside Wister Drive and Chatham Road. In Delaware County, motorists are able to pay for parking through mobile applications.

==== Public transportation ====
Millbourne station is located at the end of Sellers Avenue, which is owned and operated by SEPTA. The station goes westbound to 69th Street Transportation Center and eastbound to Frankford Transportation Center. As part of the SEPTA's revitalization of the Market-Frankford Line, Millbourne station was planned to be modernized in 1998. The station was fully modernized in 2007.

=== Utilities ===
Recycling is available every Wednesday in Millbourne. Regular trash-pick-up is available every Thursday and Friday.

Electricity to Millbourne is provided by the PECO Energy Company. Water services are provided by Aqua America.

ADSL, Cable, Fiber, Fixed Wireless and Satellite internet technology is available in Millbourne. Comcast Cable Communications, LLC provides the majority of cable internet to residents in the area. 5G in the area is commercially available from Verizon Wireless, AT&T Mobility, and T-Mobile.

Preceded by Upper Darby	Bordering communities of Philadelphia	Succeeded by Upper Darby
