= 63rd Street station (SEPTA Metro) =

Rapid transit station in Philadelphia

63rd St
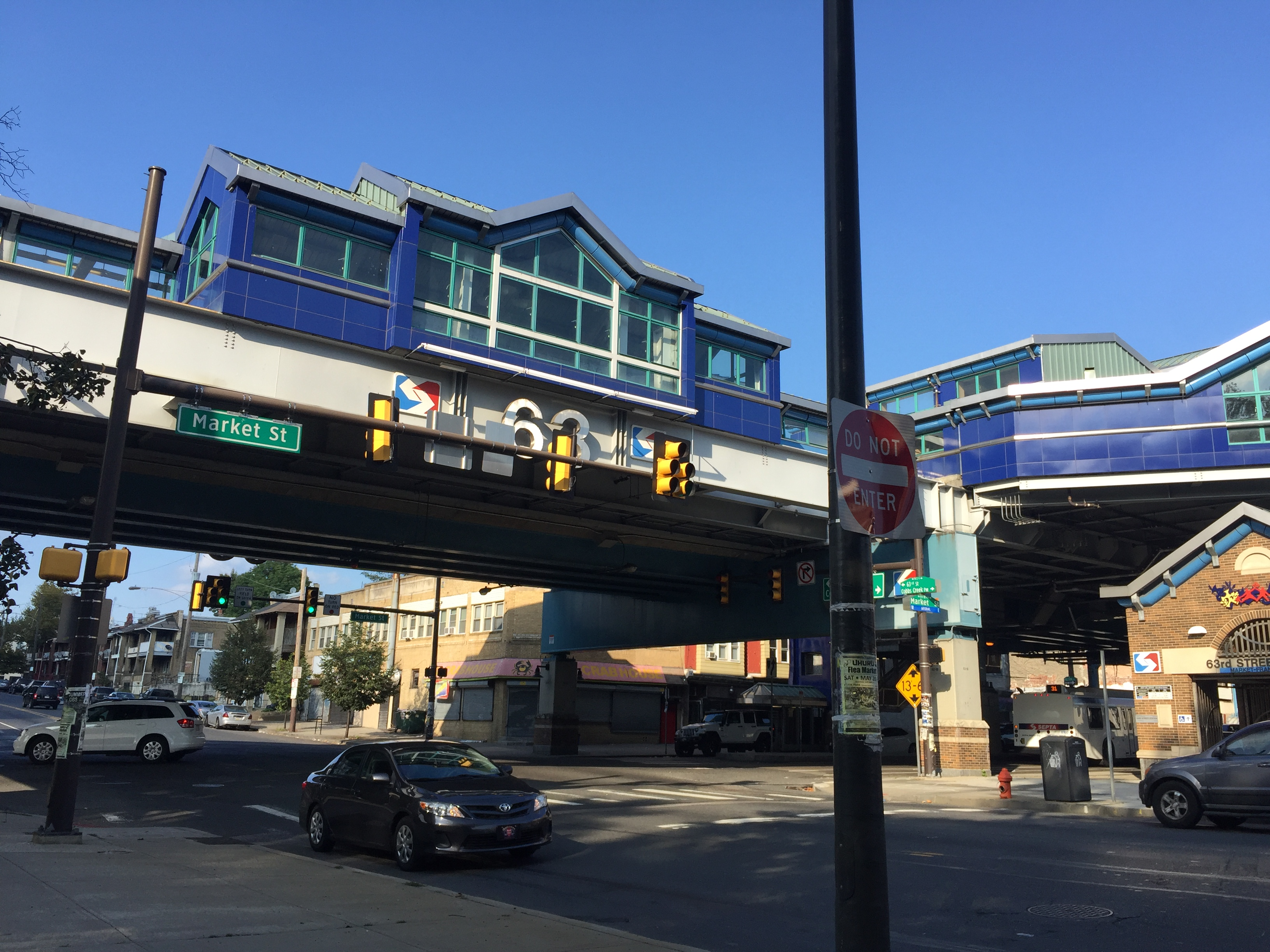
- 63rd Street station exterior from Cobbs Creek Parkway

General information
- Location: 63rd and Market Streets; Philadelphia, Pennsylvania
- Coordinates: 39°57′46″N 75°14′48″W
- Owner: SEPTA
- Platforms: 2 side platforms
- Tracks: 2
- Connections: SEPTA City Bus: 21, 31

Construction
- Structure type: Elevated
- Accessible: Yes

History
- Opened: March 4, 1907
- Rebuilt: 2009

Services
Preceding station	SEPTA Metro	Following station
Millbourne toward 69th Street T.C.	L (SEPTA Metro)	60th Street toward Frankford T.C.
Former services
Preceding station	Philadelphia Transportation Company	Following station
66th Street toward 69th Street	Market Elevated	60th Street toward Frankford
Location

63rd Street station is an elevated rapid transit station in Philadelphia, Pennsylvania, served by the SEPTA Metro L. Located at the intersection of 63rd and Market Streets in the Haddington neighborhood of West Philadelphia, it is the westernmost stop on the line within the Philadelphia city limits.

This station is also served by SEPTA bus routes 21 and 31. The station is also the northern terminus of the Cobbs Creek Trail.

== History ==
The 63rd Street station is one of the original Market Street Elevated stations built by the Philadelphia Rapid Transit Company; the line opened for service on March 4, 1907 between 69th Street and 15th Street stations.

The station was closed on June 13, 2008, for rehabilitation as part of a multi-phase reconstruction of the entire western Market Street Elevated.

Renovations to this station included the installation of new elevators, escalators and lighting, as well as other infrastructure improvements. A new brick station house was also added. The station reopened on May 4, 2009. The project resulted in the station becoming compliant with the Americans with Disabilities Act.

== Station layout ==
There are two side platforms connecting to a station house on the southeast corner of 63rd and Market streets. There are also three exit-only staircases; two descend to the west side of 63rd Street and one to the northwest corner of Market and Felton streets.

Unlike other stations along the western elevated portion of the line, the corridor between the station house and the westbound platform is above the tracks rather than below.

== Gallery ==
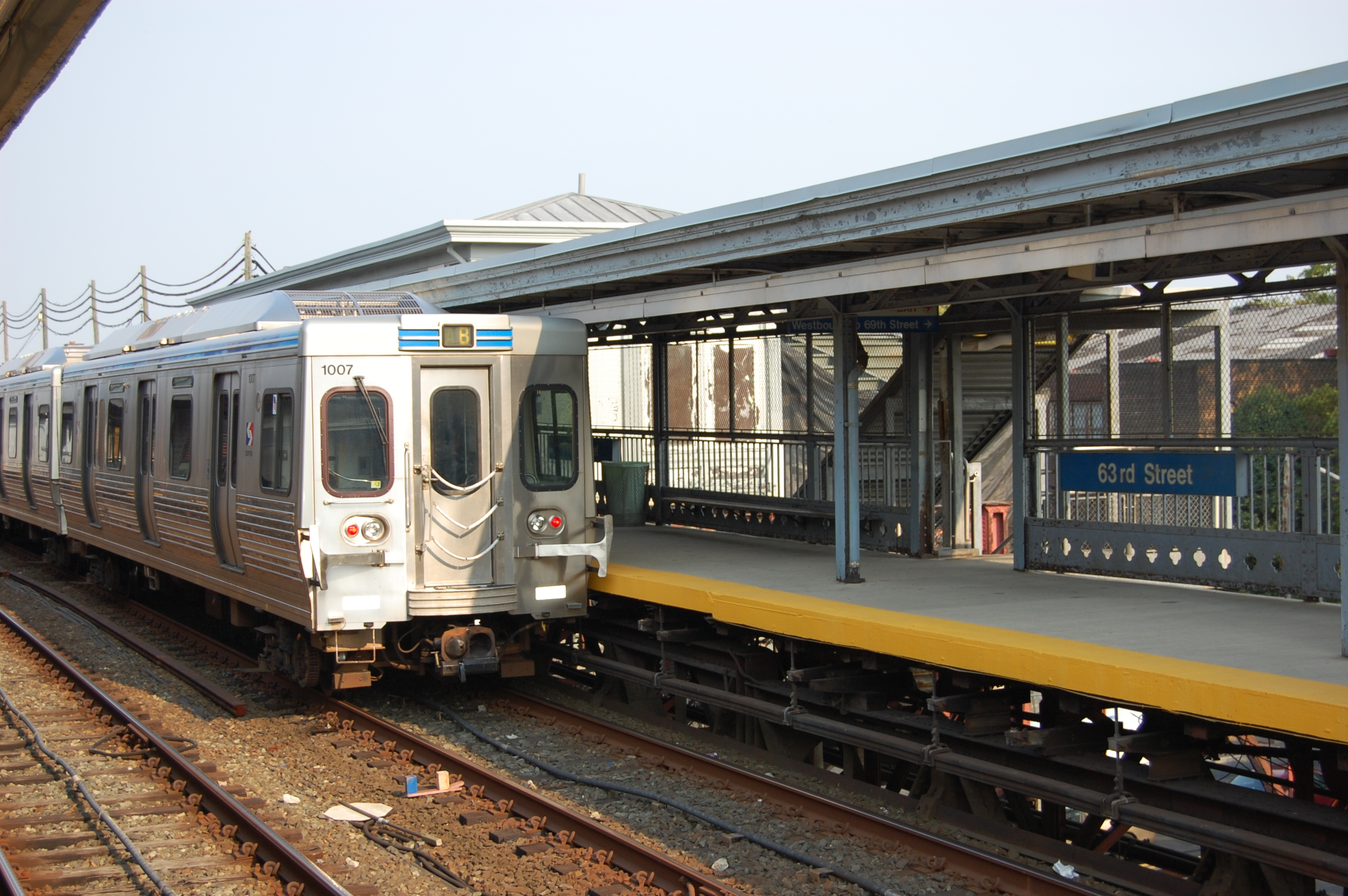
63rd Street Platform
