= Sellers family =

Family of American scientists and engineers

The Sellers family of Philadelphia and Delaware County, Pennsylvania, are a family of scientists and engineers. More members of the Sellers family and the closely related Peale family have belonged to the American Philosophical Society than any other family in the history of the United States, and the same is true of the Academy of Natural Sciences, the Franklin Institute, and the Pennsylvania Academy of the Fine Arts.

== Notable members ==
Among the best-known members of the Sellers family are: John Sellers (1728–1804) observer of the transit of Venus; William Sellers (1824–1905) designer of the standard screw thread; George Escol Sellers (1808–1899) designer of the Panama Railway, Coleman Sellers (1827–1907) inventor of the cinema and developer of hydroelectric technology; Horace Wells Sellers (1857–1933) restorer of Independence Hall; and Peter Hoadley Sellers (1930–2014) deviser of the mathematical algorithms used to decode DNA. The landscape painter Anna Sellers (1824–1905), the historian Charles Coleman Sellers (1903–1980) the philosopher Mortimer Newlin Stead Sellers (born 1959), and the actor Rosabell Laurenti Sellers (born 1996) while well known in their fields, were not engineers.

Samuel Sellers (1655–1732), progenitor of the Sellers family in North America, came to Pennsylvania from Belper in Derbyshire in 1682 and was among the Quaker founders of Darby, in what was then Chester County, Pennsylvania. His family had settled in Millbourne. The area was used as farming and a homestead for the family. Sellers brought with him the most advanced technology for making and working with wire, and built Sellers Hall (1684), for the next three centuries a center for technological innovation in North America. His son, Samuel Sellers, Jr. (1690–1773) continued to develop American wire-working and invented machines for the twisting of worsted yarn. Like their descendants, both Samuels were members of the Society of Friends, whose tolerant policies and commitment to reason encouraged scientific and mechanical pursuits.

John Sellers (1728–1804) was among the original members of the American Philosophical Society and a member with David Rittenhouse of the committee that observed the transit of Venus in 1769. He surveyed the boundary of Delaware County when it separated from Chester County and was a member of the convention that drafted the Pennsylvania Constitution of 1790. Soon afterwards he was elected to represent Delaware County in Pennsylvania's first Senate. He was a strong supporter of the American Revolution and signed much of the Continental currency.

John Sellers' son Nathan Sellers (1751–1830) was also active in the Revolution, but he was called back from the campaign by Act of Congress because his expertise in wire-working was essential to the manufacture of paper and cartridges, which had been embargoed by the British. All paper-making in North America depended on his skills, which led to numerous innovations. Nathan Sellers initiated his family's involvement in the anti-slavery movement, which would continue in concert with the Garrett, Pennock and other closely related Pennsylvania families, until the practice of slavery was abolished, not only in Pennsylvania, but throughout the United States.

William Sellers (1824–1905) founded Sellers and Company, the leading machine tool company of the nineteenth century. As president of the Franklin Institute, he proposed a standard screw thread ("the Sellers screw thread") that has since been adopted throughout the world. He pioneered principles of scientific management and efficiency in cooperation with his chief engineer, Frederick Winslow Taylor (1856–1915). Dr. Coleman Sellers (1827–1907) was also a pioneer in mechanical engineering and a founder and president of the American Society of Mechanical Engineers. He founded the Engineering Department at the University of Pennsylvania and was first president of the Philadelphia Museum of Art and the University of the Arts. He was president and professor of mechanics at the Franklin Institute and at the Stephens Institute of Technology. Among his many patents were the Kinematoscope, a protean development in the history of film. As president of the Cataract Construction Company at Niagara Falls, he was decisive in the development of hydroelectric power and the adoption of the alternating current rather than direct current in North America.

The history of the Sellers family of scientists and engineers is extensively documented by the Peale/Sellers Collection of the American Philosophical Society.
