= 56th Street station =

Rapid transit station in Philadelphia

56th St
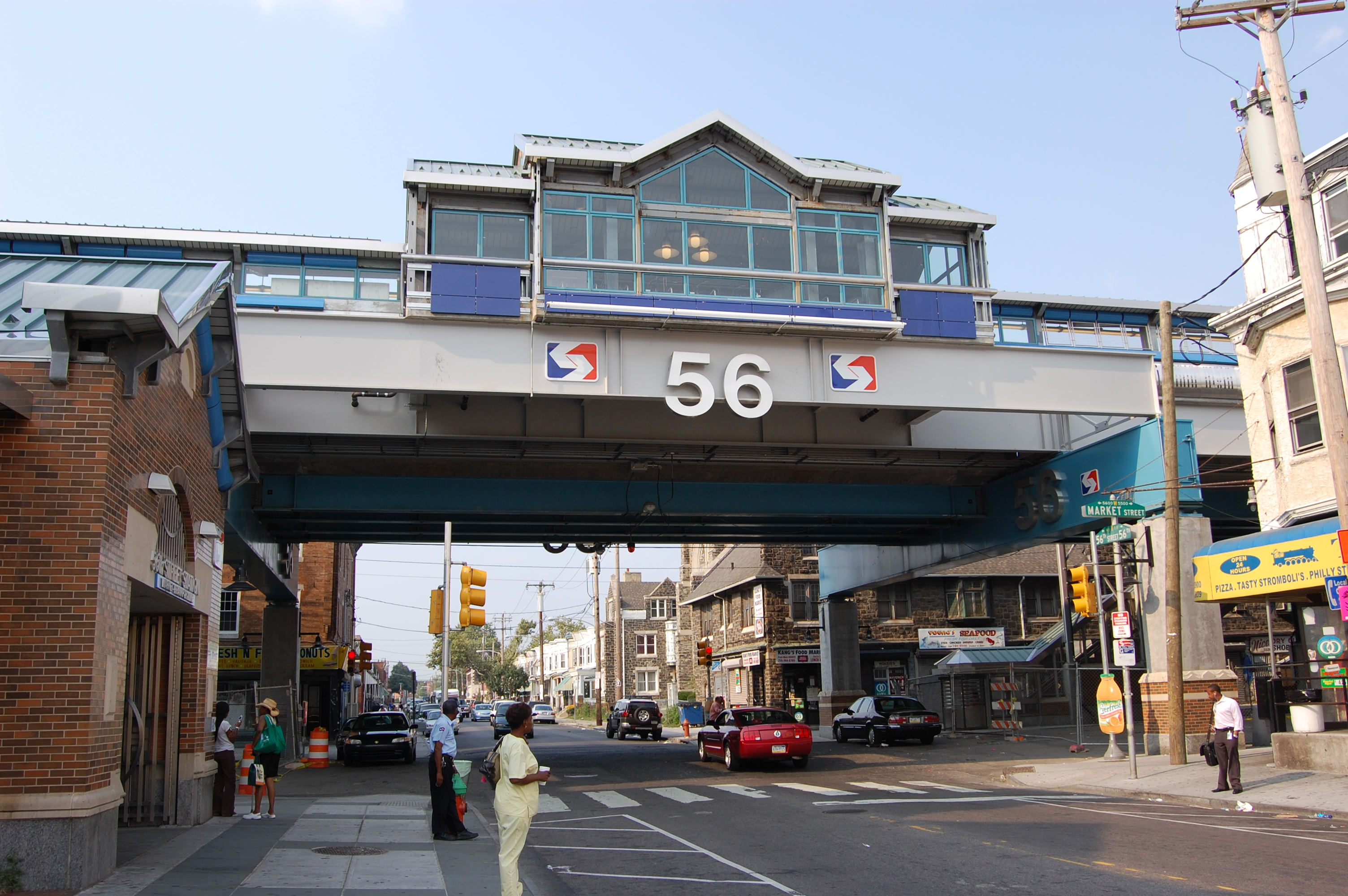
- 56th Street station Exterior

General information
- Location: 56th and Market Streets; Philadelphia, Pennsylvania
- Coordinates: 39°57′39″N 75°13′59″W
- Owner: SEPTA
- Platforms: 2 side platforms
- Tracks: 2
- Connections: SEPTA City Bus: 31, 63

Construction
- Structure type: Elevated
- Accessible: Yes

History
- Opened: March 4, 1907
- Rebuilt: 2006

Services
Preceding station	SEPTA Metro	Following station
60th Street toward 69th Street T.C.	L (SEPTA Metro)	52nd Street toward Frankford T.C.
Former services
Preceding station	Philadelphia Transportation Company	Following station
60th Street toward 69th Street	Market Elevated	52nd Street toward Frankford
Location

56th Street station is an elevated subway station on the SEPTA Metro L, located at the intersection of 56th and Market Street in Philadelphia, Pennsylvania. The station serves two West Philadelphia neighborhoods, Haddington to the north, and Cobbs Creek to the south.

The station is also served by SEPTA bus routes 31 and 63.

== History ==
56th Street station is one of the original Market Street Elevated stations built by the Philadelphia Rapid Transit Company; the line opened for service on March 4, 1907 between 69th Street and 15th Street stations.

From May 31, 2005 to February 2006, the station underwent a rehabilitation project as part of a multi-phase reconstruction of the entire western Market Street Elevated. The renovated station included new elevators, escalators, lighting, and other infrastructure, as well as a new brick station house. The project resulted in the station becoming compliant with the Americans with Disabilities Act.

== Station layout ==
There are two side platforms connecting to a station house on the southwest corner of 56th and Market streets. There are also two exit-only stairs descending to the east side of 56th Street.
