= 60th Street station (SEPTA) =

Rapid transit station in Philadelphia

60th St
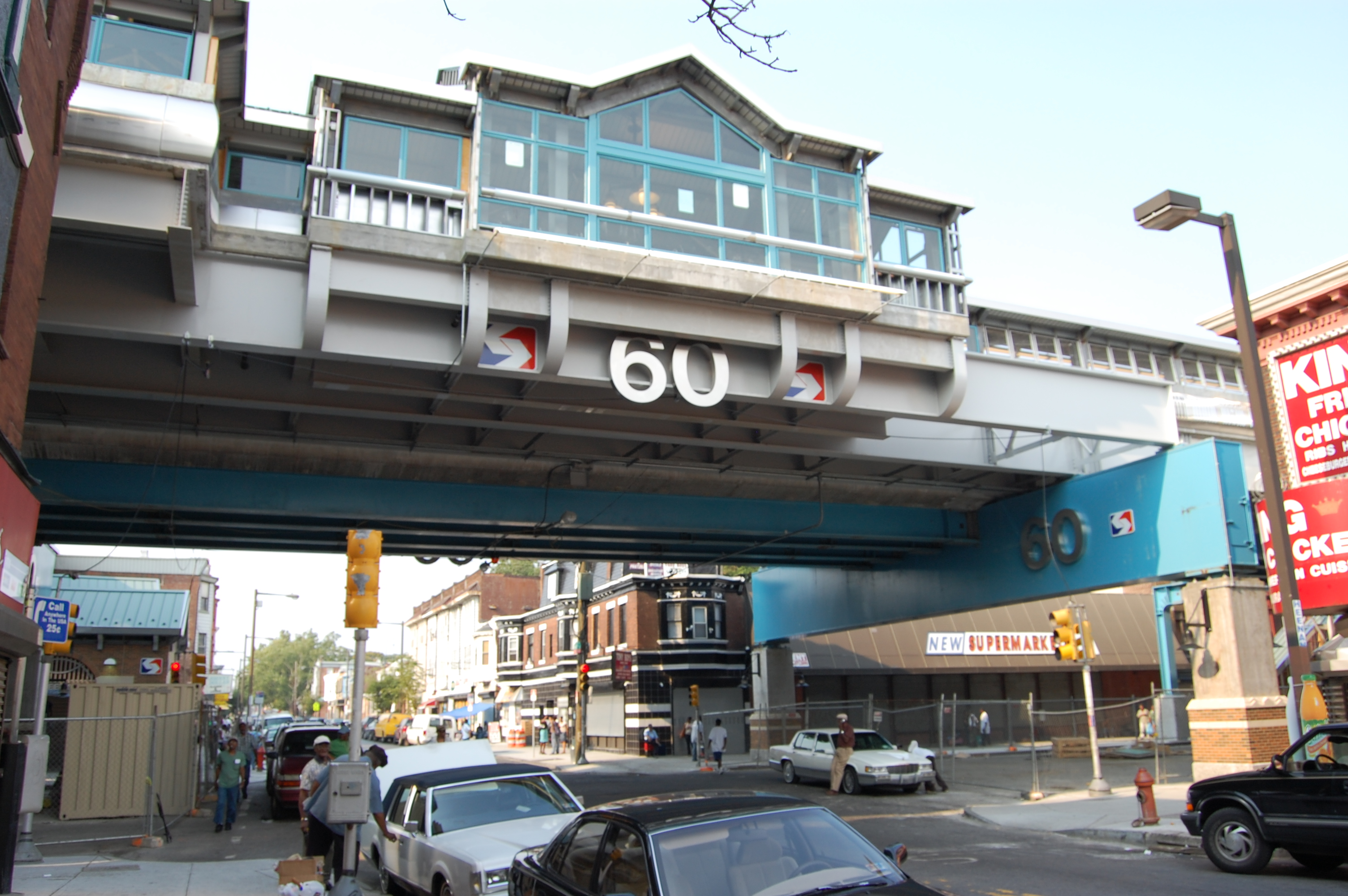
- 60th Street station exterior

General information
- Location: 60th and Market Streets; Philadelphia, Pennsylvania
- Coordinates: 39°57′43″N 75°14′27″W
- Owner: SEPTA
- Platforms: 2 side platforms
- Tracks: 2
- Connections: SEPTA City Bus: 31, 46

Construction
- Structure type: Elevated
- Accessible: Yes

History
- Opened: March 4, 1907
- Rebuilt: 2007

Services
Preceding station	SEPTA Metro	Following station
63rd Street toward 69th Street T.C.	L (SEPTA Metro)	56th Street toward Frankford T.C.
Former services
Preceding station	Philadelphia Transportation Company	Following station
63rd Street toward 69th Street	Market Elevated	56th Street toward Frankford
Location

60th Street station is an elevated rapid transit station on the SEPTA Metro L, located at the intersection of 60th Street and Market Street in Philadelphia, Pennsylvania. The station straddles the line between two West Philadelphia neighborhoods, Haddington to the north and Cobbs Creek.

The station is also served by SEPTA bus routes 31 and 46.

== History ==
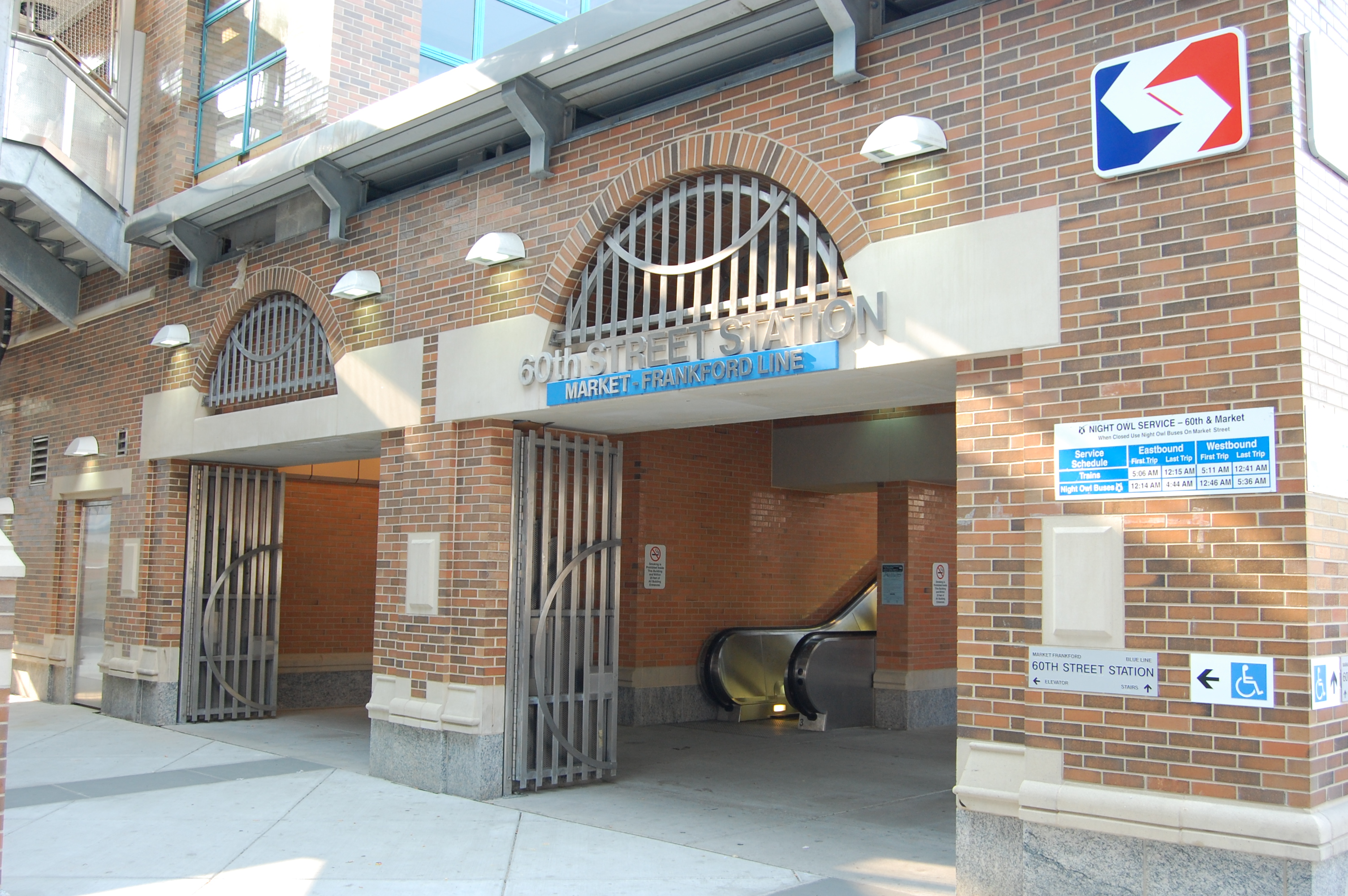
The main entrance to the station

60th Street station is one of the original Market Street Elevated stations built by the Philadelphia Rapid Transit Company; the line opened for service on March 4, 1907 between 69th Street and 15th Street stations.

From June 2006 to January 2007, the station was closed for rehabilitation as part of a multi-phase reconstruction of the entire western Market Street Elevated. The renovated station included new elevators, escalators, lighting, and other infrastructure, as well as a renovated brick station house. The station reopened in January 2007 but the work was not fully completed until June 18, 2007. The project resulted in the station becoming compliant with the Americans with Disabilities Act.

== Station layout ==
There are two side platforms connecting to a station house on the northwest corner of 60th and Market streets. Two exit-only stairs descend to the east side of 60th Street.
