= Financially Distressed Municipalities Act =

Act in Pennsylvania regarding municipal debt

The Financially Distressed Municipalities Act (Act of 1987, P.L. 246, No. 47), also known as Act 47, is a Pennsylvania statute outlining procedures to stabilize municipalities in Pennsylvania undergoing financial distress. The Act empowers the Pennsylvania Department of Community and Economic Development to declare certain municipalities as financially distressed. It provides for the restructuring of debt of financially distressed municipalities, limits the ability of financially distressed municipalities to obtain government funding; authorizes municipalities to participate in federal debt adjustment actions and bankruptcy actions under certain circumstances; and provides for consolidation or merger of contiguous municipalities to relieve financial distress.

== History ==
Most provisions of Act 47 initially remained suspended until the termination of the Pennsylvania Intergovernmental Cooperation Act (Section 708 of Act 1991, June 5, P.L. 9, No 6).

The cities of Erie and Altoona, among others, have narrowly avoided Act 47 designation. Their mayors seek legislative changes to the binding arbitration rules of Act 111, as well as a reduction in the designation of tax-exempt properties, to improve their financial health.

=== Benefits of Act 47 ===
Although some municipalities (listed in the chart below) have had the Financially Distressed designation removed, most cannot afford to lose the benefits Act 47 provides. The benefits include revenue from the nonresident wage tax available only to cities with Act 47 status.

=== Distressed municipalities ===
The following municipalities were designated as part of the Municipalities Financial Recovery Program as of the date indicated. Any dates of imposition and lifting of sanctions, and the rescinding of the initial designation are also noted.

Municipality	County	Designated	Sanctioned	Sanction rescinded	Designation rescinded
Aliquippa	Beaver	December 22, 1987			December 1, 2023
Altoona	Blair	April 1, 2012			September 13, 2017
Ambridge	Beaver	April 10, 1990			April 16, 1993
Braddock	Allegheny	June 15, 1988			July 19, 2023
Chester	Delaware	April 6, 1995			
Clairton	Allegheny	January 19, 1988			November 24, 2015
Colwyn	Delaware	May 6, 2015			April 29, 2022
Duquesne	Allegheny	June 20, 1991			October 15, 2023
East Pittsburgh	Allegheny	November 13, 1992			December 27, 1999
Farrell	Mercer	November 12, 1987			February 8, 2019
Franklin	Cambria	July 26, 1988			January 31, 2023
Greenville	Mercer	May 8, 2002			November 9, 2023
Harrisburg	Dauphin	October 20, 2010			
Homestead	Allegheny	March 22, 1993			March 28, 2007
Johnstown	Cambria	August 21, 1992			April 28, 2023
Mahanoy City	Schuylkill	February 18, 2016			February 23, 2023
Millbourne	Delaware	January 7, 1993			March 11, 2014
Nanticoke	Luzerne	May 26, 2006			May 3, 2016
New Castle	Lawrence	January 5, 2007			December 12, 2023
Newville	Cumberland	August 9, 2023			
North Braddock	Allegheny	May 22, 1995			April 11, 2003
Pittsburgh	Allegheny	December 29, 2003			February 12, 2018
Plymouth	Luzerne	July 27, 2004			May 3, 2016
Rankin	Allegheny	January 9, 1989			May 24, 2023
Reading	Berks	October 14, 2009			July 14, 2022
Scranton	Lackawanna	January 10, 1992	January 1, 1999	November 22, 2002	January 25, 2022
Shamokin	Northumberland	June 16, 2014			August 20, 2024
Shenandoah	Schuylkill	May 20, 1988			April 16, 1993
West Hazleton	Luzerne	March 27, 2003			October 21, 2014
Westfall	Pike	April 14, 2009			October 12, 2014
Wilkinsburg	Allegheny	January 19, 1988			November 10, 1998

- List of Act 47 Municipalities
