= Dunlap, Philadelphia =

Dunlap
- Neighborhood of Philadelphia
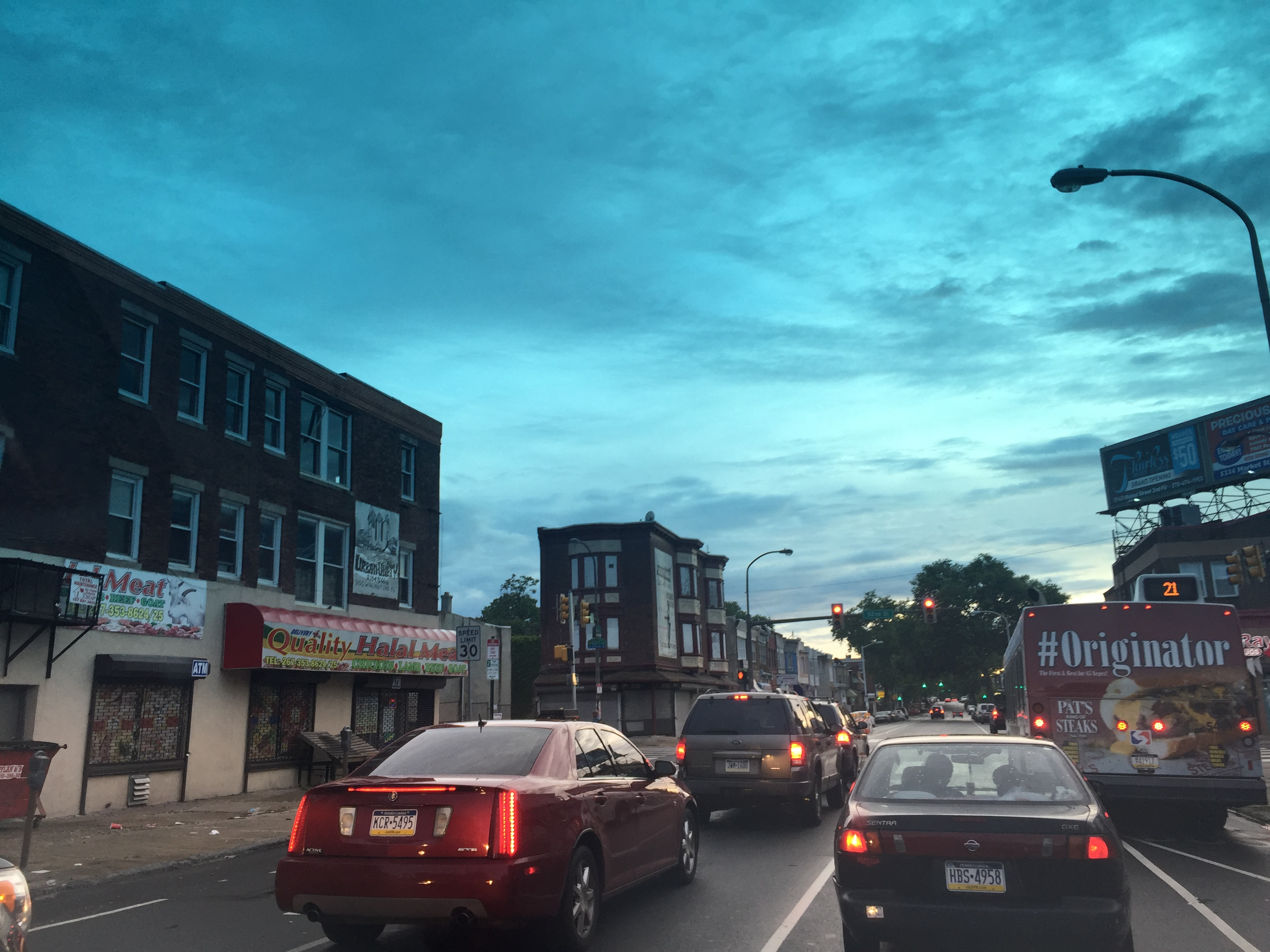
- Dunlap neighborhood

- Location within Philadelphia
- Country: United States
- State: Pennsylvania
- County: Philadelphia
- City: Philadelphia
- ZIP code: 19139
- Area codes: 215, 267 and 445

Dunlap is a small neighborhood in the West Philadelphia section of Philadelphia, Pennsylvania, United States. The neighborhood lies between Haverford Avenue and Market Street and stretches from 46th to 52nd streets. Dunlap is squeezed between the neighborhoods of Mill Creek and Haddington and situated just north of Walnut Hill. The neighborhood is named after the former historic Thomas Dunlap School that was restored into senior homes in 1991. Dunlap is located in the 19139 ZIP Code, and is situated in the Philadelphia Police Department's 19th police district, which encompasses a large portion of West Philadelphia.

According to some sources, the neighborhood is generally known for low income housing, with household incomes generally below the poverty level. The area has many dilapidated or abandoned houses.

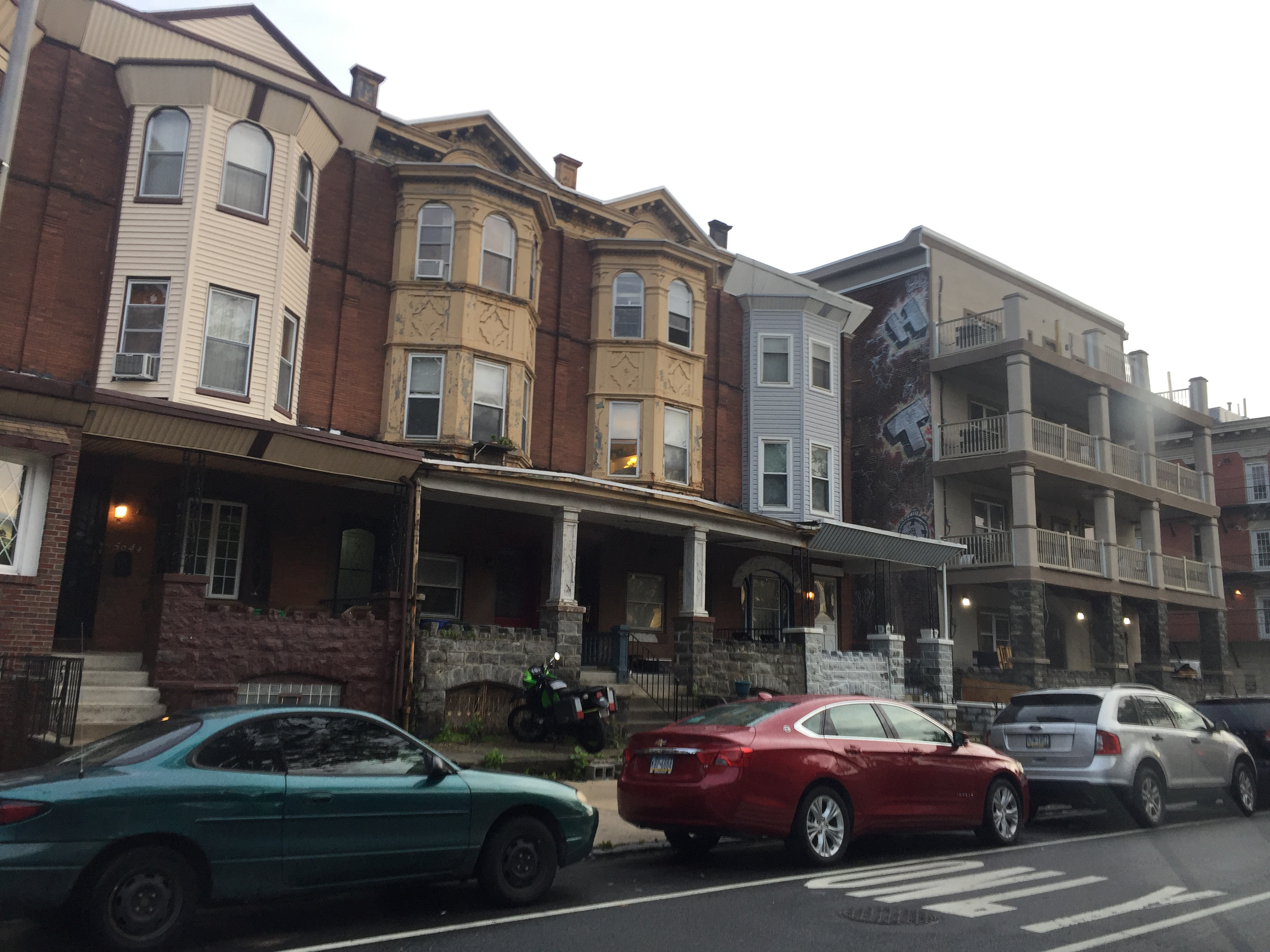
Houses in the Dunlap neighborhood

The area is served by SEPTA's 52nd Street station.
