= Benjamin Bartholomew =

American politician (1752–1812)

Member of the Pennsylvania House of Representatives from the Chester County district
- In office 1773–1776 Serving with Charles Humphreys, Isaac Pearson, John Morton, John Jacobs, John Minshall, James Hockey, George Ashbridge, James Gibbs, Joseph Pennock, James Gibbons, Anthony Wayne, Joseph Pyle
- Preceded by: John Morton, John Jacobs, John Sellers, John Minshall, John Crosby, Charles Humphreys, Isaac Pearson, George Ashbridge
- Succeeded by: John Jacobs, Caleb Davis, Joseph Gardner, John Fulton, Samuel Cunningham, John Sellers

Personal details
- Born: February 16, 1752
- Died: March 31, 1812 (aged 60) East Whiteland Township, Pennsylvania, U.S.
- Resting place: Great Valley Baptist Church Cemetery; Tredyffrin Township, Pennsylvania, U.S.
- Spouse: Rachel Dewees
- Children: 10
- Occupation: Politician; farmer

Benjamin Bartholomew (February 16, 1752 – March 31, 1812) was an American politician from Pennsylvania. He served as a member of the Pennsylvania Provincial Assembly, representing Chester County from 1773 to 1776.

== Early life ==
Benjamin Bartholomew was born on February 16, 1752, to Sarah and Joseph Bartholomew. After his father died, he was left 160 acres (65 ha) of farmland that he farmed.

== Career ==
Bartholomew served as a member of the Pennsylvania Provincial Assembly, representing Chester County from 1773 to 1776. In January 1775, he was a member of the council of safety for the Revolutionary convention. At the outbreak of the Revolutionary War, he raised a company of volunteers. He attained the rank of captain of the 5th Pennsylvania Regiment on October 2, 1776. After the war, he continued working as a farmer.

== Personal life ==
Bartholomew married Rachel Dewees, daughter of William Dewees. They had ten children, Joseph, Hannah (born 1772), Sarah, John, Rachel, Marian, Edward, Augustine, Benjamin and Ellen. His great-grandson John Cleaver Bartholomew was a veterinarian.

Bartholomew died on March 31, 1812, aged 60, at his farm in East Whiteland Township. He was buried at Great Valley Baptist Church Cemetery in Tredyffrin Township.
