= 52nd Street station (SEPTA Metro) =

Rapid transit station in Philadelphia

52nd St
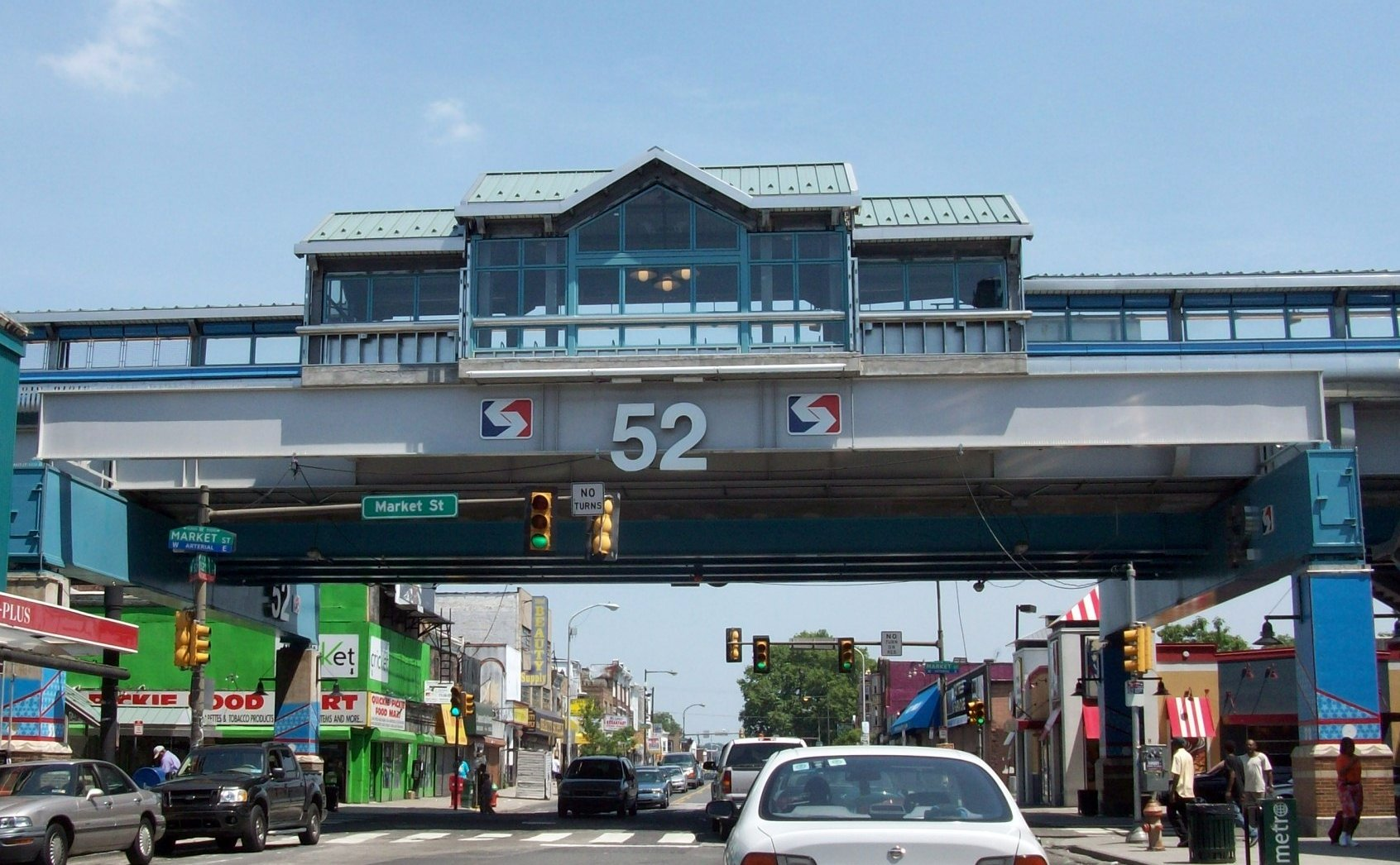
- Station exterior as seen from 52nd Street

General information
- Location: 5200 Market Street; Philadelphia, Pennsylvania
- Coordinates: 39°57′35″N 75°13′30″W
- Owner: SEPTA
- Platforms: 2 side platforms
- Tracks: 2
- Connections: SEPTA City Bus: 31, 52

Construction
- Structure type: Elevated
- Accessible: Yes

History
- Opened: March 4, 1907
- Rebuilt: 2008

Services
| Preceding station | SEPTA Metro | Following station |
|---|---|---|
| 56th Street toward 69th Street T.C. | L (SEPTA Metro) | 46th Street toward Frankford T.C. |
Former services
| Preceding station | Philadelphia Transportation Company | Following station |
|---|---|---|
| 56th Street toward 69th Street | Market Elevated | 46th Street toward Frankford |
Location

52nd Street station is an elevated SEPTA Metro stop on the L, above the intersection of 52nd Street and Market Street in Philadelphia, Pennsylvania. The station lies at the junction of four neighborhoods. Haddington is to the northwest, Dunlap to the northeast, Walnut Hill to the southeast, and Cobbs Creek to the southwest.

The SEPTA bus routes serving 52nd Street are routes 31 and 52. 52nd Street is a major shopping corridor in West Philadelphia.

== History ==
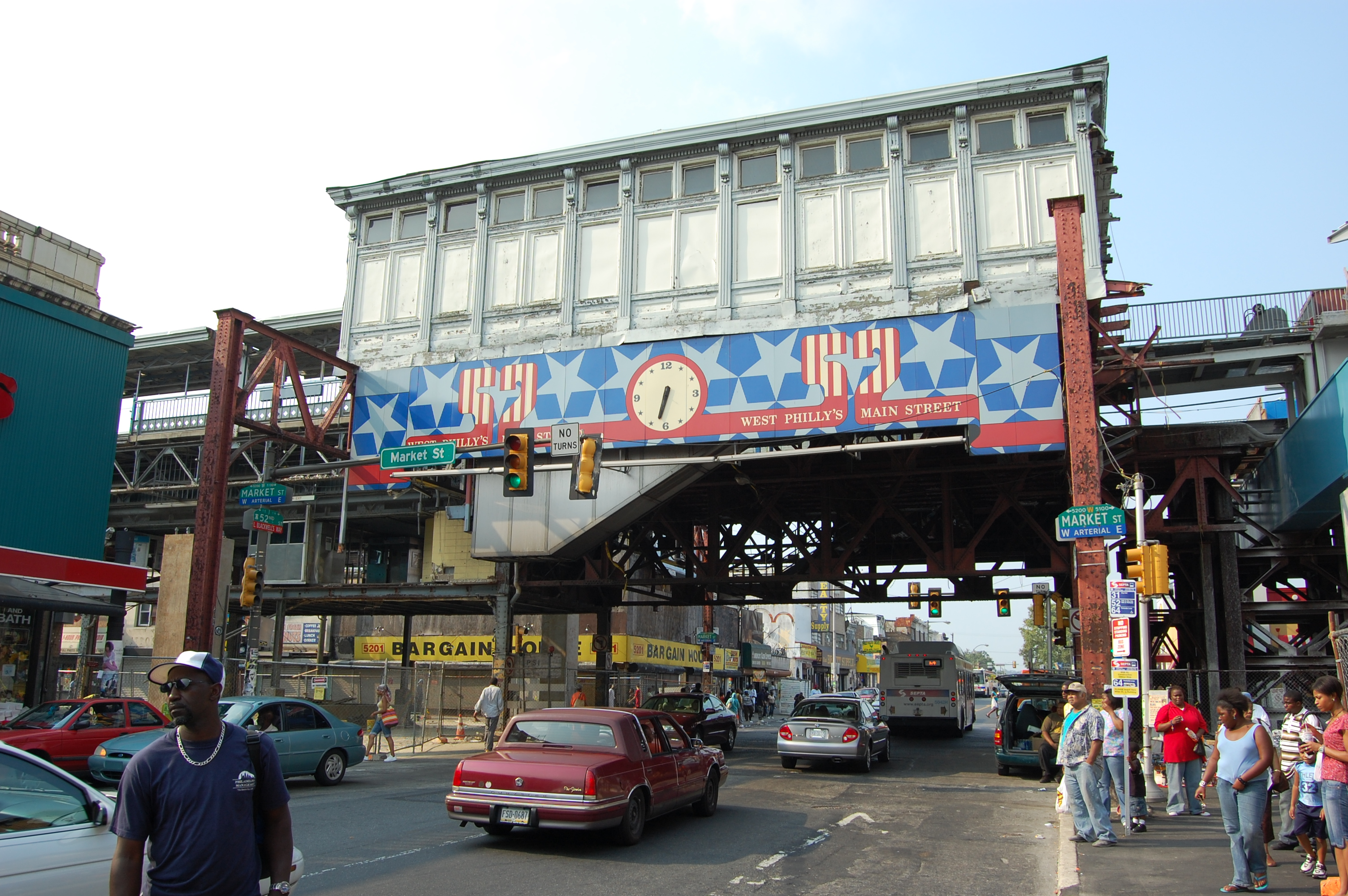
The station prior to reconstruction, showing its 1970's Bicentennial trim

52nd Street station is one of the original Market Street Elevated stations built by the Philadelphia Rapid Transit Company; the line opened for service on March 4, 1907, between 69th Street and 15th Street stations.

From October 2006 to February 2008, the station underwent a rehabilitation project as part of a multi-phase reconstruction of the entire western Market Street Elevated. The renovated station included new elevators, escalators, lighting, and other infrastructure, as well as a new brick station house. Unlike other stations in the project, 52nd Street was never closed for an extended period of time. The project resulted in the station becoming compliant with the Americans with Disabilities Act.

In April 2007, the Philadelphia Police Department labeled this intersection the "Worst Corner In The City" due to the high crime and rate of shootings on the block. There were 16 shootings within a 4-month span beginning in June 2006.

== Station layout ==
There are two side platforms connecting to a station house on the southeast corner of 52nd and Market streets. Two exit-only stairs descend to the west side of 52nd Street.
