= Sellers Hall =

Historic house in Pennsylvania, United States

- U.S. National Register of Historic Places
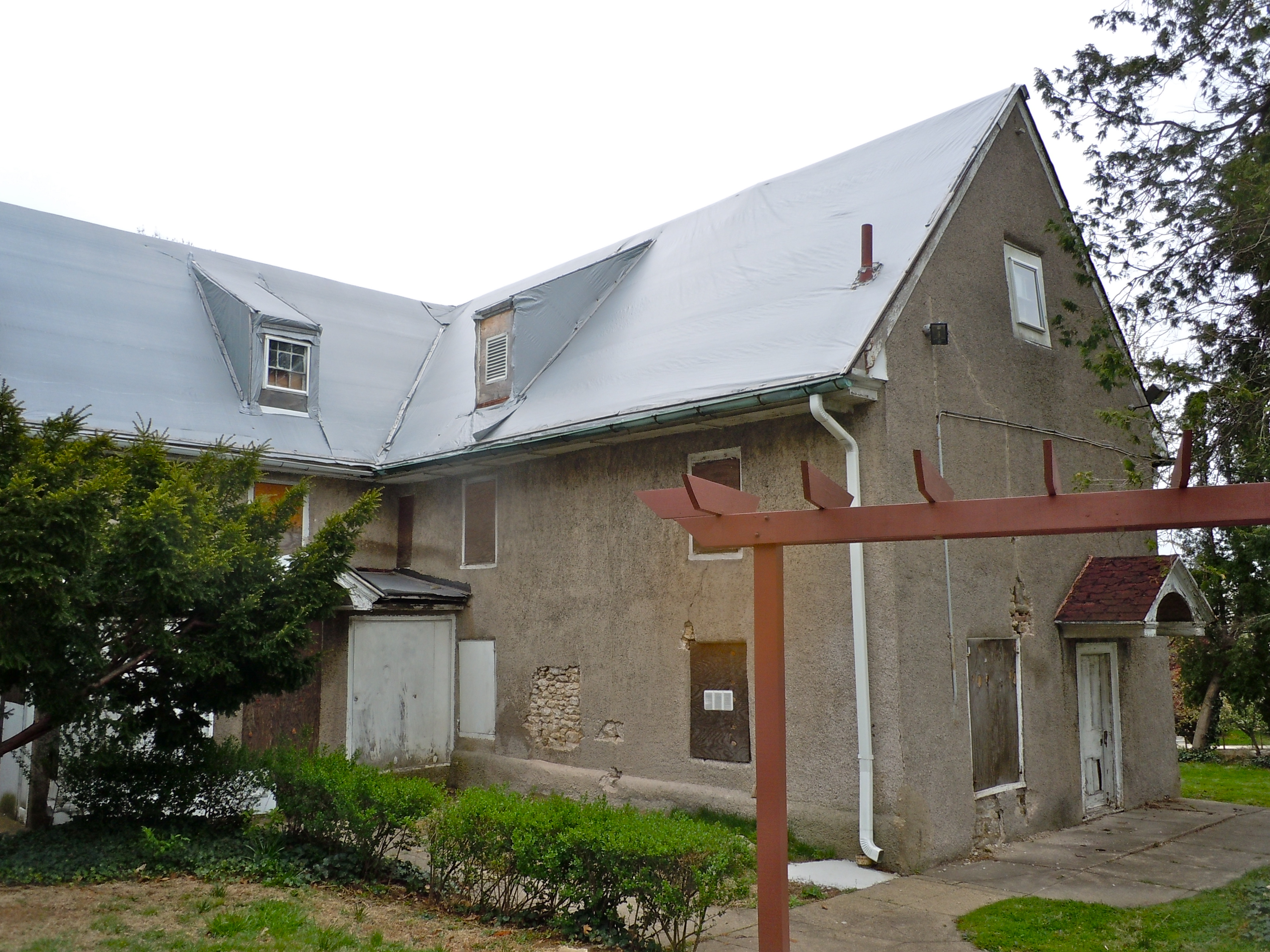
- Sellers Hall in 2011

- Location within Pennsylvania
- Location: NW corner of Hampden Rd. & Walnut St., Upper Darby Township, Pennsylvania
- Coordinates: 39°57′26″N 75°15′41″W
- Area: 0.5 acres (0.20 ha)
- NRHP reference No.: 100002339
- Added to NRHP: April 18, 2018

Sellers Hall, located in Upper Darby and completed in 1684, is one of the oldest buildings in Pennsylvania and is the ancestral home of the Sellers family of scientists and engineers.

Samuel Sellers (1655-1732) arrived in Philadelphia in 1682, the first year of Penn's colony. A young man, he was eager to marry, which explains the very early date of the house. He married Anna Gibbons (1655-1743) on August 13, 1684, and moved into Sellers Hall. The Sellers' declaration of intention to marry is the first entry in the minutes of Darby meeting.

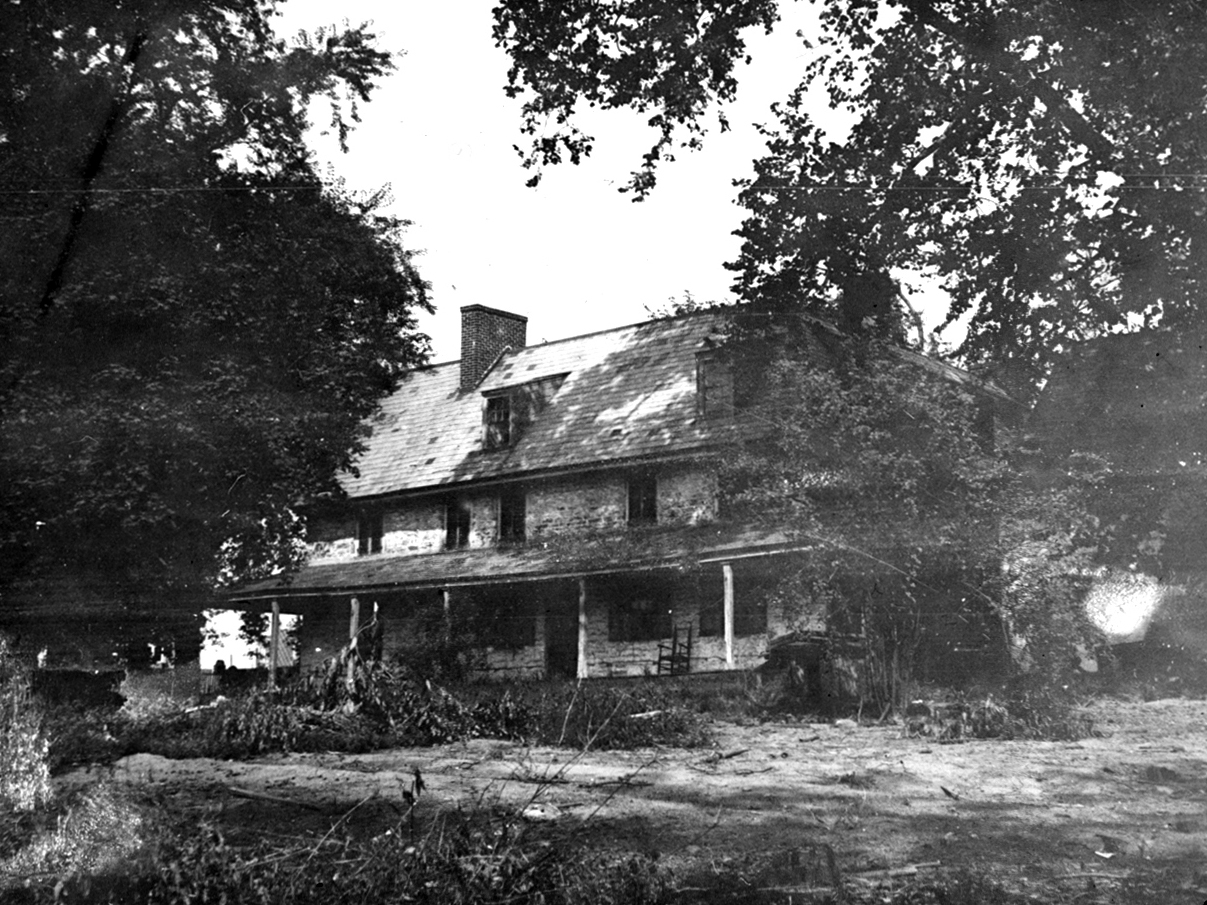
Earlier photo

Samuel Sellers brought with him from Derbyshire in England the technology for making and weaving wire. This technology, and his mills on Cobbs Creek in Upper Darby, became the basis for a series of inventions and mechanical innovations that would lead to the creation of the early Pennsylvania textile industry at Cardington, the North American paper-making industry, and the fire-hose, fire-engine, and locomotive-making industries in Pennsylvania. Leading American manufacturers such as the Edgemoor Iron company, Midvale Steel, and William Sellers & Company grew out of enterprises conceived and pursued from Sellers Hall.

As the focus of Sellers family activities, Sellers Hall also played a significant role in the political and social life of the United States. John Sellers of Sellers Hall (1728-1804) was among the founders of the American Philosophical Society, one of the framers of the Pennsylvania Constitution of 1790. and represented Delaware County in Pennsylvania's first Senate. With David Rittenhouse (1732-1796), he served on the Scientific Committee that observed the transit of Venus on the third of June, 1769.

Sellers Hall's large farm and outbuildings became a significant step on the Underground Railroad, clandestinely coordinated through the Concord Quarterly Meeting, and the monthly meetings in Concord, Darby, and Wilmington, Delaware. Nathan Sellers (1751-1830) and David Sellers (1757-1813) were among the founders of the Pennsylvania Society for the Abolition of Slavery in 1789 and Samuel Sellers (1810-1888), Nathan Sellers, Jr. (1788-1867), and John Sellers, Jr. (1762-1847) founded the Upper Darby Abolition Society in 1830. Close relatives such as Thomas Garrett (1789-1871) (whose brother married Abigail Sellers and whose son married Frances Sellers) and Abraham Pennock (1786-1868) (who married Elizabeth Sellers) conducted escaping slaves through Sellers Hall. The historians Cope and Ashmead describe as many as thirty persons secreted in the spacious Sellers barns, where they were cared for by George Sellers (1768-1853) and his family, before moving on in small squads and detachments to their next place of refuge.

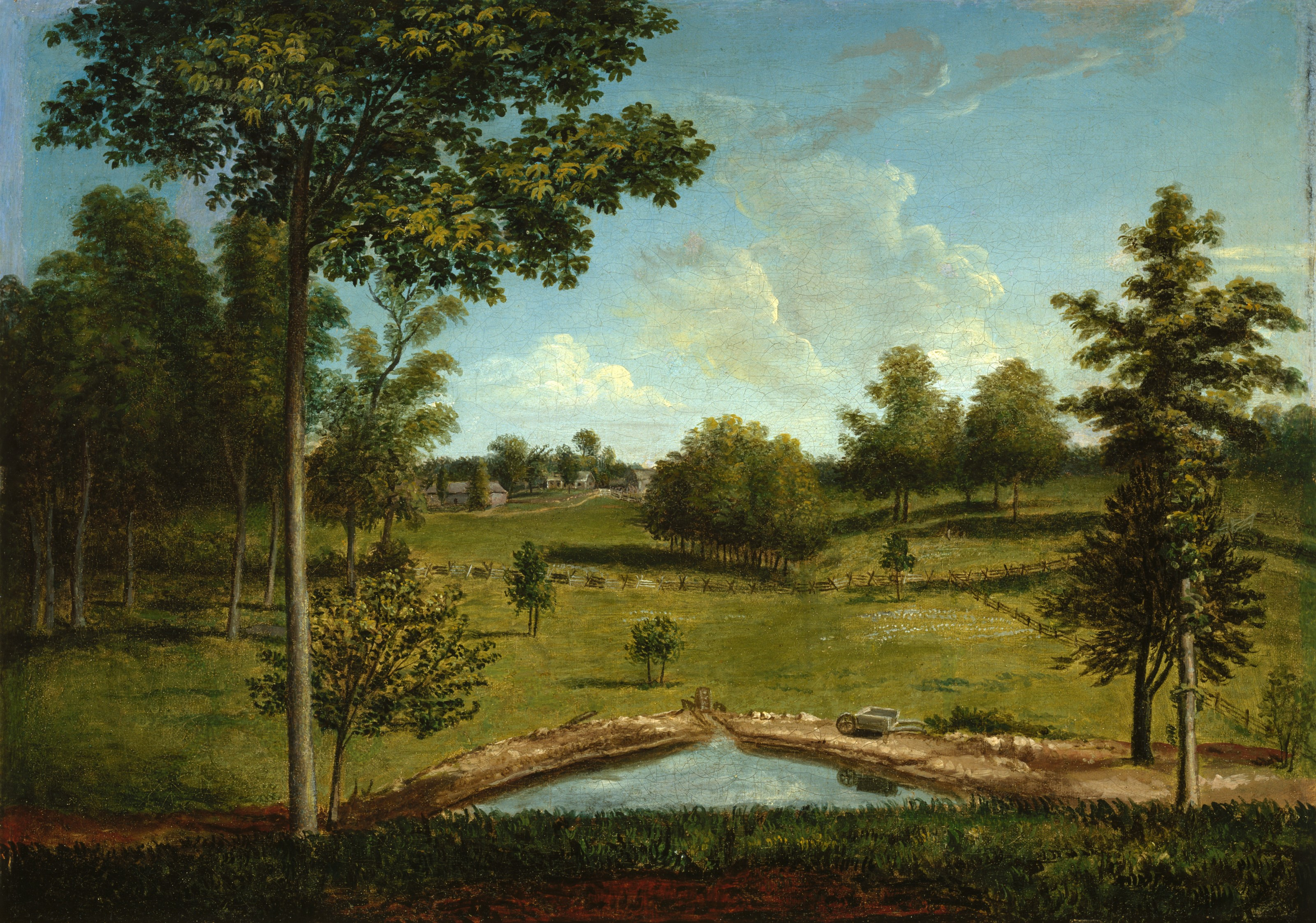
Charles Willson Peale, Landscape Looking Toward Sellers Hall from Mill Bank c.1818. Sellers Hall is on the horizon, center left

The painter Charles Willson Peale, (1741-1827) who voted for the abolition of slavery as a member of the Pennsylvania Assembly in 1780, was a frequent visitor of Sellers Hall. His distant view of Sellers Hall (1818) is an early example of American landscape painting. Peale's daughter, Sophonisba (1786-1859), married Coleman Sellers (1781-1834), and Peale's granddaughter, the landscape painter Anna Sellers (1824-1905), lived at Sellers Hall.

In 1922 Sellers Hall became the property of the Archdiocese of Philadelphia, used first as St. Alice's Church, then as the St. Alice Rectory, and finally as the St. Alice Library.

The Friends of Sellers Hall began the restoration of Sellers Hall in 2010 and in 2016 acquired Sellers Hall, which was placed on the National Register of Historic Places in 2018.
