= Millbourne station =

Rail station in Millbourne, Pennsylvania

Millbourne
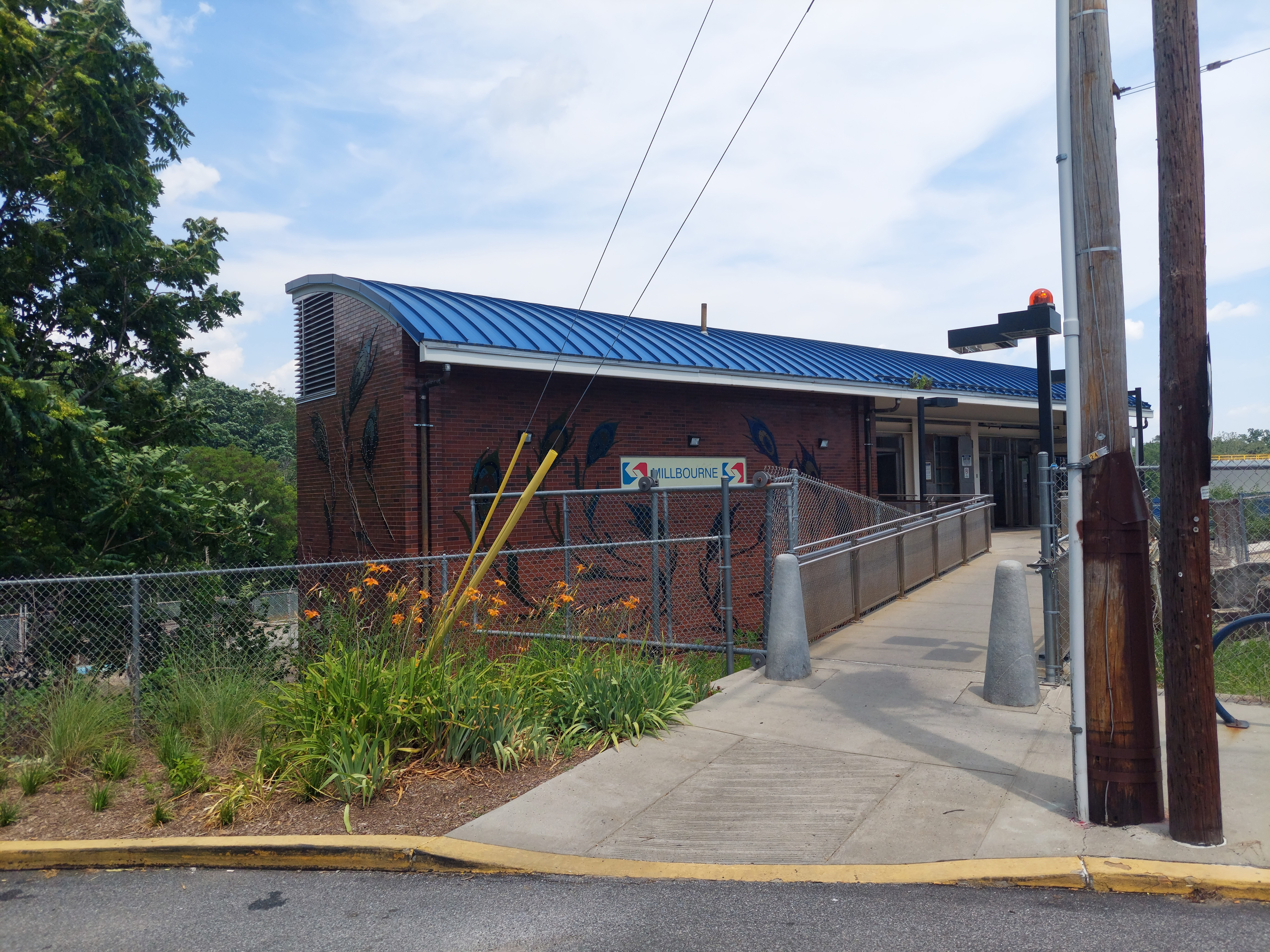
- Station building as seen from Wister Drive

General information
- Location: Wister Drive & Millbourne Avenue; Millbourne, Pennsylvania
- Coordinates: 39°57′52″N 75°15′08″W
- Owner: SEPTA
- Platforms: 2 side platforms
- Tracks: 2

Construction
- Structure type: At-grade
- Accessible: Yes

History
- Opened: March 4, 1907
- Rebuilt: 2008

Services
Preceding station	SEPTA Metro	Following station
69th Street T.C. Terminus	L (SEPTA Metro)	63rd Street toward Frankford T.C.
Former services
Preceding station	Philadelphia Transportation Company	Following station
69th Street Terminus	Market Elevated	63rd Street toward Frankford
Location

Millbourne station is a rapid transit station on SEPTA's L, located just east of the intersection of Millbourne Avenue and Wister Drive in Millbourne, Pennsylvania. It is one of two ground-level stops on the L, as well as one of two SEPTA rapid transit stations located outside the Philadelphia city limits. While most L stations west of 2nd Street station are on Market Street, Millbourne is two blocks north of it.

== History ==
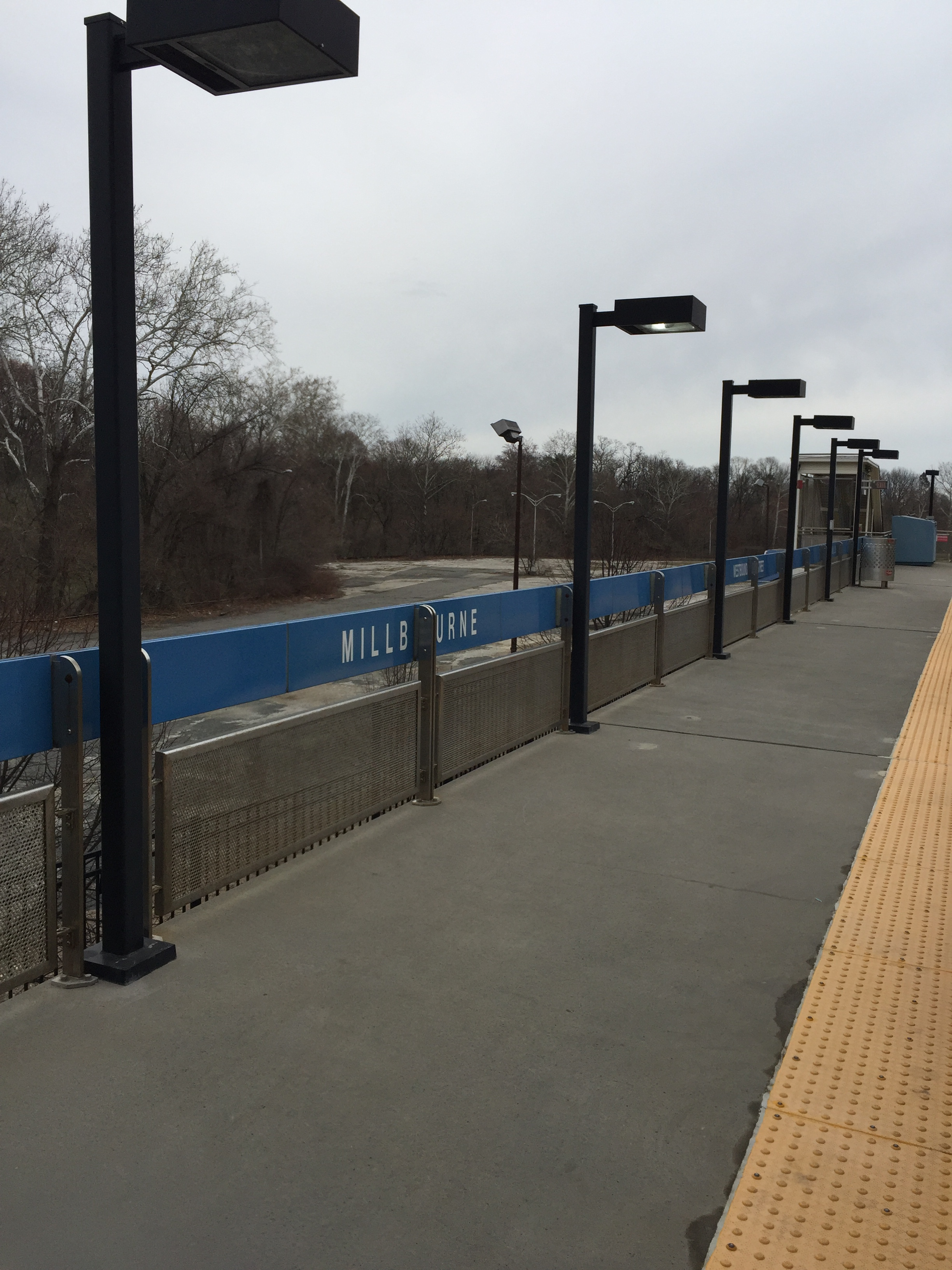
The station's westbound platform

Millbourne station is one of the original Market Street Elevated stations built by the Philadelphia Rapid Transit Company; the line opened for service on March 4, 1907 between 69th Street Transit Center and 15th St./City Hall stations.

The station was closed on April 23, 2007 for rehabilitation as part of a multi-phase reconstruction of the entire western Market Street Elevated. The renovated station included new elevators, lighting, and other infrastructure, as well as a new brick station house. Narrow wooden platforms were replaced by concrete platforms complete with ADA-accessible tactile warning strips. The station reopened on June 16, 2008.

During the L's former rush-hour skip-stop service pattern, Millbourne was served by "B" trains, with "A" trains bypassing the station. Following a successful pilot program where all trains made all stops, the skip-stop practice was discontinued on February 24, 2020.

== Station layout ==
The station has two side platforms connected via an elevated walkway over the tracks to the station house at Wister Drive and Sellers Avenue. There is an additional exit-only gate at the east end of the eastbound platform, which leads to a staircase to North Millbourne Avenue, a dead-end residential street one block to the east.
