= John Sellers (surveyor) =

American scientist and politician (1728–1804)

Member of the Pennsylvania State Senate from the Delaware County, Philadelphia County and the Philadelphia district
- In office 1790–1794

Member of the Pennsylvania Provincial Assembly from Chester County
- In office 1761–1771 Serving with Isaac Person, Charles Humphreys, George Ashbridge, John Minshall, Jonas Preston, John Jacobs, Nathaniel Pennock, John Crosby, John Morton
- Preceded by: George Ashbridge, Nathaniel Pennock, John Jacobs, Charles Humphreys, Isaac Pearson, Joshua Ash, John Minshall, Jonas Preston
- Succeeded by: Charles Humphreys, Isaac Pearson, John Morton, John Jacobs, John Minshall, James Hockley, George Ashbridge, Benjamin Bartholomew

Personal details
- Born: 1728 Upper Darby Township, Province of Pennsylvania
- Died: February 2, 1804 (aged 75–76) Upper Darby Township, Pennsylvania, U.S.
- Resting place: Darby Friends Cemetery
- Party: Federalist
- Occupation: Politician; surveyor; engineer

John Sellers (1728 – February 2, 1804) was an American scientist, politician and surveyor from Pennsylvania. He served in the Pennsylvania Provincial Assembly, then a unicameral legislature, representing Chester County from 1767 to 1771. He became a member of the Pennsylvania State Senate after its creation, representing Delaware and Philadelphia counties and the city of Philadelphia from 1790 to 1794. He was a founding member of the American Philosophical Society and observed the Transit of Venus in 1769.

== Early life ==
John Sellers was born on September (or November) 19, 1728, at Sellers Hall in Upper Darby Township, Pennsylvania, to Sarah (née Smith) and Samuel Sellers. He was a birthright member of the Darby Friends Meeting, and probably attended Darby Friends School (1692-1917) which taught survey. His grandfather Samuel Sellers worked as a weaver and emigrated from Derbyshire in 1684.

== Career ==
=== Surveying career ===
Sellers worked as a weaver. He was appointed surveyor by the governor to run a line from Schuylkill to Lancaster to prepare for the Strasburg Road. He was appointed as road commissioner of the Strasburg Road. He was appointed as a surveying engineer of the Union Canal. He was also involved in the Schuylkill-Susquehanna canal study of 1783 and the boundary commission for the newly created Delaware County in 1789.

=== American Philosophical Society ===
Sellers was one of the original members of the American Philosophical Society. He joined the organization in 1768. Sellers and David Rittenhouse and others were members of the society's committee that observed the Transit of Venus in 1769 and reported their observations for the benefit of science.

=== Political career ===
Sellers was a Federalist. He was a member of the Pennsylvania Provincial Assembly (later the Pennsylvania House of Representatives), representing Chester County, from 1767 to 1771. He was appointed one of the Boston Port Bill Committee and was a deputy in the first Provincial Conference of Representatives at Philadelphia on July 14, 1774. These activities on behalf of the Revolution and particularly Sellers' role in signing the Continental currency led to his disownment by the Society of Friends.

He was a member of the constitutional convention of 1789, representing Delaware. He served in the first session of the Pennsylvania Senate. He represented Delaware and Philadelphia counties and Philadelphia from 1790 to 1794. He was appointed by Governor Thomas Mifflin as associate judge of the Delaware County Court, but declined the appointment.

== Personal life ==
Sellers grandson James Sellers was an inventor and had a wire weaving business. His great-great grandson James C. Sellers was a Philadelphia lawyer.

Sellers died on February 2, 1804, in Upper Darby. He was interred at Darby Friends Cemetery.
