= List of SEPTA Metro stations =

SEPTA Metro consists of six lines containing thirteen services. The L and B were both inherited from the former Philadelphia Transportation Company, and originally built by the Philadelphia Rapid Transit Company. The system also includes the M, an interurban rail line between Norristown, Pennsylvania and Upper Darby Township, Pennsylvania, originally owned by the Philadelphia and Western Railroad, then acquired by the Philadelphia Suburban Transportation Company (PSTC).

The system also contains three trolley lines. The T and the G were inherited from the former Philadelphia Transportation Company (PTC) and originally built by the Philadelphia Rapid Transit Company (PRT). The D was built by the Philadelphia and West Chester Traction Company (P&WCTC) and later inherited by the Philadelphia Suburban Transportation Company (PSTC). Operation of the D was taken over by SEPTA in 1970.

== Key of services ==
Line	Type	Service	Termini	
Line	Type	Service	South/West	North/East
L (SEPTA Metro)	Rapid transit	All Stops	69th Street T.C.	Frankford T.C.
B (SEPTA Metro)	Rapid transit	Local	NRG Station	Fern Rock T.C.
B (SEPTA Metro)	Rapid transit	Express	Walnut–Locust; NRG Station (Sports Express)	Fern Rock T.C.
B (SEPTA Metro)	Rapid transit	Spur	8th–Market	Olney Transit Center (Weekday); Fern Rock T.C. (Saturday)
T (SEPTA Metro)	Light rail	Lancaster Avenue	63rd–Malvern/Overbrook	13th Street
T (SEPTA Metro)	Light rail	Baltimore Avenue	61st–Baltimore/Angora	13th Street
T (SEPTA Metro)	Light rail	Chester Avenue	Yeadon; Darby Transit Center (Limited)	13th Street
T (SEPTA Metro)	Light rail	Woodland Avenue	Darby Transit Center	13th Street
T (SEPTA Metro)	Light rail	Elmwood Avenue	80th Street/Eastwick	13th Street
G (SEPTA Metro)	Streetcar	All Stops	63rd–Girard	Richmond–Westmoreland or Frankford–Delaware
D (SEPTA Metro)	Light rail	Media	Orange Street/Media	69th Street T.C.
D (SEPTA Metro)	Light rail	Sharon Hill	Chester Pike/Sharon Hill	69th Street T.C.
M (SEPTA Metro)	Light metro	Local	69th Street T.C.	Norristown T.C.

== List of stations ==
†	Terminal of a SEPTA Metro service

Station	Service	Neighborhood/municipality/borough	County	Former operator	Disabled access	Opened	Connections/notes
2nd Street	L (SEPTA Metro)	Center City, Philadelphia	Philadelphia	PRT	Disabled access	1908	
5th Street/Independence Hall	L (SEPTA Metro)	Center City, Philadelphia	Philadelphia	PRT	Disabled access	1908	Formerly known as 5th Street
8th–Market†	L (SEPTA Metro) B (SEPTA Metro)	Center City, Philadelphia	Philadelphia	PRT	Disabled access	1908 (MFL); 1932 (BRS)	PATCO; Jefferson Station
~~11th Street~~	L (SEPTA Metro)	Center City, Philadelphia	Philadelphia	PRT		1908	Jefferson Station; Temporarily closed through 2027
13th Street†	L (SEPTA Metro) T1 (SEPTA Metro) T2 (SEPTA Metro) T3 (SEPTA Metro) T4 (SEPTA Metro) T5 (SEPTA Metro)	Center City, Philadelphia	Philadelphia	PRT	Disabled access	1908	Formerly known as Juniper Street for the T line
15th Street/City Hall	L (SEPTA Metro) B (SEPTA Metro) T1 (SEPTA Metro) T2 (SEPTA Metro) T3 (SEPTA Metro) T4 (SEPTA Metro) T5 (SEPTA Metro)	Center City, Philadelphia	Philadelphia	PRT	Disabled access	1907 (MFL); 1928 (BSL)	Suburban Station
19th Street	T1 (SEPTA Metro) T2 (SEPTA Metro) T3 (SEPTA Metro) T4 (SEPTA Metro) T5 (SEPTA Metro)	Center City, Philadelphia	Philadelphia	PRT		1907	
22nd Street	T1 (SEPTA Metro) T2 (SEPTA Metro) T3 (SEPTA Metro) T4 (SEPTA Metro) T5 (SEPTA Metro)	Center City, Philadelphia	Philadelphia	PTC		1955	Replaced the former 24th Street surface stop
33rd Street	T1 (SEPTA Metro) T2 (SEPTA Metro) T3 (SEPTA Metro) T4 (SEPTA Metro) T5 (SEPTA Metro)	West Philadelphia	Philadelphia	PTC		1955	
34th Street	L (SEPTA Metro)	West Philadelphia	Philadelphia	PTC		1956	
36th–Sansom	T2 (SEPTA Metro) T3 (SEPTA Metro) T4 (SEPTA Metro) T5 (SEPTA Metro)	West Philadelphia	Philadelphia	PTC		1955	Formerly known as 36th Street (2025)
36th Street Portal	T1 (SEPTA Metro)	West Philadelphia	Philadelphia	PTC		1955	
37th–Spruce	T2 (SEPTA Metro) T3 (SEPTA Metro) T4 (SEPTA Metro) T5 (SEPTA Metro)	West Philadelphia	Philadelphia	PTC		1955	
40th Street	L (SEPTA Metro)	West Philadelphia	Philadelphia	PTC	Disabled access	1956	
40th Street Portal	T2 (SEPTA Metro) T3 (SEPTA Metro) T4 (SEPTA Metro) T5 (SEPTA Metro)	West Philadelphia	Philadelphia	PTC		1955	
46th Street	L (SEPTA Metro)	West Philadelphia	Philadelphia	PRT	Disabled access	1907	
52nd Street	L (SEPTA Metro)	West Philadelphia	Philadelphia	PRT	Disabled access	1907	
56th Street	L (SEPTA Metro)	West Philadelphia	Philadelphia	PRT	Disabled access	1907	
60th Street	L (SEPTA Metro)	West Philadelphia	Philadelphia	PRT	Disabled access	1907	
63rd Street	L (SEPTA Metro)	West Philadelphia	Philadelphia	PRT	Disabled access	1907	
69th Street T.C.†	L (SEPTA Metro) M (SEPTA Metro) D (SEPTA Metro)	Upper Darby	Delaware	PRT	Disabled access	1907	
Anderson Avenue	D (SEPTA Metro)	Upper Darby Township	Delaware	P&WCTC		1913	
Andrews Avenue	D (SEPTA Metro)	Collingdale	Delaware	P&WCTC		1906	
Ardmore Avenue	M (SEPTA Metro)	Haverford Township	Delaware	P&W		1907	
Ardmore Junction	M (SEPTA Metro)	Haverford Township	Delaware	P&W		1907	
Aronimink	D (SEPTA Metro)	Upper Darby Township	Delaware	P&WCTC		1913	
Arrott Transit Center	L (SEPTA Metro)	Near Northeast Philadelphia	Philadelphia	PRT	Disabled access	1922	Formerly known as Margaret–Orthodox
Avon Road	D (SEPTA Metro)	Upper Darby Township	Delaware	P&WCTC		1906	Formerly known as Bywood
Baltimore Avenue	D (SEPTA Metro)	Clifton Heights	Delaware	P&WCTC		1906	
Bartram Avenue	D (SEPTA Metro)	Collingdale	Delaware	P&WCTC		1906	
Beatty Road	D (SEPTA Metro)	Media	Delaware	P&WCTC		1913	
Beechwood–Brookline	M (SEPTA Metro)	Haverford Township	Delaware	P&W		1907	
Berks	L (SEPTA Metro)	Kensington, Philadelphia	Philadelphia	PRT	Disabled access	1922	
Beverly Boulevard	D (SEPTA Metro)	Upper Darby Township	Delaware	P&WCTC		1906	Formerly known as Beverly Hills
Bridgeport	M (SEPTA Metro)	Bridgeport	Montgomery	P&W		1912	
Broad–Allegheny	B (SEPTA Metro)	Upper North Philadelphia	Philadelphia	PRT	Disabled access	1928	Formerly known as Allegheny (2025)
Broad–Girard	B (SEPTA Metro) G (SEPTA Metro)	Lower North Philadelphia	Philadelphia	PRT	Disabled access	1928	Formerly known as Girard (2025)
Broad–Spring Garden	B (SEPTA Metro)	Lower North Philadelphia	Philadelphia	PRT	Disabled access	1928	Formerly known as Spring Garden (2025)
Brookside–Springfield	D (SEPTA Metro)	Springfield Township	Delaware	P&WCTC		1913	Formerly known as Springfield Road (2025)
Bryn Mawr South	M (SEPTA Metro)	Radnor Township	Delaware	P&W		1907	
Cecil B. Moore	B (SEPTA Metro)	Lower North Philadelphia	Philadelphia	PRT	Disabled access	1928	Formerly known as Columbia
Chester Pike/Sharon Hill†	D (SEPTA Metro)	Sharon Hill	Delaware	P&WCTC		1906	Formerly known as Sharon Hill (2025)
Chinatown	B (SEPTA Metro)	Center City, Philadelphia	Philadelphia	PRT		1932	Formerly known as Vine
Church	L (SEPTA Metro)	Near Northeast Philadelphia	Philadelphia	PRT	Disabled access	1922	Formerly known as Ruan–Church
Congress Avenue	D (SEPTA Metro)	Upper Darby Township	Delaware	P&WCTC		1906	
County Line	M (SEPTA Metro)	Lower Merion Township	Montgomery	P&W		1912	
Creek Road	D (SEPTA Metro)	Upper Darby Township	Delaware	P&WCTC		1906	Formerly known as Oakview
DeKalb Street	M (SEPTA Metro)	Bridgeport	Montgomery	P&W		1912	Formerly known as King Manor
Drexel Hill Junction	D (SEPTA Metro)	Upper Darby Township	Delaware	P&WCTC		1906	
Drexel Manor	D (SEPTA Metro)	Upper Darby Township	Delaware	P&WCTC		1906	
Drexel Park	D (SEPTA Metro)	Upper Darby Township	Delaware	P&WCTC		1906	
Drexel Station at 30th Street	L (SEPTA Metro) T1 (SEPTA Metro) T2 (SEPTA Metro) T3 (SEPTA Metro) T4 (SEPTA Metro) T5 (SEPTA Metro)	West Philadelphia	Philadelphia	PTC	Disabled access	1955	30th Street Station; Formerly known as 30th Street (2024)
Drexelbrook	D (SEPTA Metro)	Upper Darby Township	Delaware	P&WCTC		1913	
Drexeline	D (SEPTA Metro)	Upper Darby Township	Delaware	P&WCTC		1913	
Ellsworth–Federal	B (SEPTA Metro)	South Philadelphia	Philadelphia	PRT		1938	
Erie	B (SEPTA Metro)	Upper North Philadelphia	Philadelphia	PRT		1928	
Erie–Torresdale	L (SEPTA Metro)	Near Northeast Philadelphia	Philadelphia	PRT	Disabled access	1922	
Fairmount	B (SEPTA Metro)	Lower North Philadelphia	Philadelphia	PRT		1928 (BSL); 1932 (BRS)	
Fairfield Avenue	D (SEPTA Metro)	Upper Darby Township	Delaware	P&WCTC		1906	Alternatively known as Terminal Square
Fern Rock T.C.†	B (SEPTA Metro)	Olney-Oak Lane, Philadelphia	Philadelphia	PTC	Disabled access	1956	SEPTA Lansdale/Doylestown Line Warminster Line West Trenton Line
Frankford T.C.†	L (SEPTA Metro)	Near Northeast Philadelphia	Philadelphia	PRT	Disabled access	1922	Formerly known as Bridge–Pratt
Front–Girard	L (SEPTA Metro) G (SEPTA Metro)	Near Northeast Philadelphia	Philadelphia	PRT	Disabled access	1922	Formerly known as Girard (2025)
Garrettford	D (SEPTA Metro)	Upper Darby Township	Delaware	P&WCTC		1906	
Garrett Hill	M (SEPTA Metro)	Radnor Township	Delaware	P&W		1907	
Gulph Mills	M (SEPTA Metro)	Upper Merion Township	Montgomery	P&W	Disabled access	1912	
Haverford South	M (SEPTA Metro)	Haverford Township	Delaware	P&W		1907	
Hilltop Road	D (SEPTA Metro)	Upper Darby Township	Delaware	P&WCTC		1906	
Huey Avenue	D (SEPTA Metro)	Upper Darby Township	Delaware	P&WCTC		1913	
Hughes Park	M (SEPTA Metro)	Upper Merion Township	Montgomery	P&W		1912	
Hunting Park	B (SEPTA Metro)	Upper North Philadelphia	Philadelphia	PRT		1928	
Huntingdon	L (SEPTA Metro)	Kensington, Philadelphia	Philadelphia	PRT	Disabled access	1922	
Irvington Road	D (SEPTA Metro)	Upper Darby Township	Delaware	P&WCTC		1906	
Kensington–Allegheny	L (SEPTA Metro)	Kensington, Philadelphia	Philadelphia	PRT	Disabled access	1922	Formerly known as Allegheny (2025)
Lansdowne Avenue	D (SEPTA Metro)	Upper Darby Township	Delaware	P&WCTC		1906	
Leamy Avenue	D (SEPTA Metro)	Springfield Township	Delaware	P&WCTC		1913	
Logan	B (SEPTA Metro)	Olney-Oak Lane, Philadelphia	Philadelphia	PRT		1928	
Lombard–South	B (SEPTA Metro)	Center City, Philadelphia	Philadelphia	PRT		1932	
MacDade Boulevard	D (SEPTA Metro)	Collingdale	Delaware	P&WCTC		1906	Formerly known as Collingdale
Matsonford	M (SEPTA Metro)	Lower Merion Township	Montgomery	P&W		1912	Formerly known as Conshohocken Road
Marshall Road	D (SEPTA Metro)	Upper Darby Township	Delaware	P&WCTC		1906	
Millbourne	L (SEPTA Metro)	Millbourne	Delaware	PRT	Disabled access	1907	Formerly known as 66th Street
North Philadelphia	B (SEPTA Metro)	North Philadelphia	Philadelphia	PRT	Disabled access	1928	North Broad; North Philadelphia
Norristown T.C.†	M (SEPTA Metro)	Norristown	Montgomery	P&W	Disabled access	1912	Moved to current location in 1989.
North Street	D (SEPTA Metro)	Collingdale	Delaware	P&WCTC		1906	
NRG Station†	B (SEPTA Metro)	South Philadelphia	Philadelphia	none	Disabled access	1973	Formerly known as Pattison and AT&T; Limited service for the B2
Olney Transit Center†	B (SEPTA Metro)	Olney-Oak Lane, Philadelphia	Philadelphia	PRT	Disabled access	1928	
Oregon	B (SEPTA Metro)	South Philadelphia	Philadelphia	none	Disabled access	1973	
Paper Mill Road	D (SEPTA Metro)	Springfield Township	Delaware	P&WCTC		1913	
Parkview	M (SEPTA Metro)	Upper Darby Township	Delaware	P&W		1907	
Penfield	M (SEPTA Metro)	Haverford Township	Delaware	P&W		1907	
Penn Street	D (SEPTA Metro)	Clifton Heights	Delaware	P&WCTC		1906	
Pine Ridge	D (SEPTA Metro)	Springfield Township	Delaware	P&WCTC		1913	
Providence Road/Media	D (SEPTA Metro)	Media	Delaware	P&WCTC		1913	Formerly known as Bowling Green and Providence Road
Race–Vine	B (SEPTA Metro)	Center City, Philadelphia	Philadelphia	PRT	Disabled access	1928	
Radnor South	M (SEPTA Metro)	Radnor Township	Delaware	P&W		1912	(at Radnor)
Roberts Road	M (SEPTA Metro)	Lower Merion Township	Delaware	P&W		1912	Formerly known as Rosemont
Saxer Avenue	D (SEPTA Metro)	Springfield Township	Delaware	P&WCTC		1913	
Scenic Road	D (SEPTA Metro)	Springfield Township	Delaware	P&WCTC		1913	
School Lane	D (SEPTA Metro)	Upper Darby Township	Delaware	P&WCTC		1913	
Snyder	B (SEPTA Metro)	South Philadelphia	Philadelphia	PRT		1938	Terminus of B line until 1973
Somerset	L (SEPTA Metro)	Kensington, Philadelphia	Philadelphia	PRT	Disabled access	1922	
Spring Garden	L (SEPTA Metro)	Lower North Philadelphia	Philadelphia	none		1977	Replaced former Fairmount elevated station
Springfield Mall	D (SEPTA Metro)	Springfield Township	Delaware	P&WCTC		1913	Formerly known as Sproul Road
Springfield–Madison	D (SEPTA Metro)	Clifton Heights	Delaware	P&WCTC		1906	Formerly known as Springfield Road (2025)
Stadium	M (SEPTA Metro)	Radnor Township	Delaware	P&W	Disabled access	1912	Known as Stadium–Ithan Avenue from 2010 to 2024
Susquehanna–Dauphin	B (SEPTA Metro)	Lower North Philadelphia	Philadelphia	PRT		1928	Formerly known as Dauphin–Susquehanna
Tasker–Morris	B (SEPTA Metro)	South Philadelphia	Philadelphia	PRT		1938	
Thomson Avenue	D (SEPTA Metro)	Springfield Township	Delaware	P&WCTC		1913	
Tioga	L (SEPTA Metro)	Kensington, Philadelphia	Philadelphia	PRT	Disabled access	1922	
Township Line Road	M (SEPTA Metro)	Haverford Township	Delaware	P&W		1907	Formerly known as West Overbrook
Villanova South	M (SEPTA Metro)	Radnor Township	Delaware	P&W		1907	
Walnut Street	D (SEPTA Metro)	Upper Darby Township	Delaware	P&WCTC		1906	
Walnut–Locust†	B (SEPTA Metro)	Center City, Philadelphia	Philadelphia	PRT	Disabled access	1930	PATCO 12–13th & Locust, 15–16th & Locust
Woodland Avenue	D (SEPTA Metro)	Springfield Township	Delaware	P&WCTC		1913	
Wynnewood Road	M (SEPTA Metro)	Haverford Township	Delaware	P&W		1907	
Wyoming	B (SEPTA Metro)	Olney-Oak Lane, Philadelphia	Philadelphia	PRT		1928	
York–Dauphin	L (SEPTA Metro)	Kensington, Philadelphia	Philadelphia	PRT	Disabled access	1922	Formerly known as Dauphin–York

== List of former stations ==
Station	Service	Neighborhood / Municipality / Borough	County	Former operator	Opened	Closed	Connections / Notes
8th & Market (Bridge)	Bridge	Center City, Philadelphia	Philadelphia	PRT	1936	–	Operated by PATCO Speedline since 1968
9–10th & Locust	Bridge	Center City, Philadelphia	Philadelphia	PTC	1953	–	Operated by PATCO Speedline since 1968
12–13th & Locust	Bridge	Center City, Philadelphia	Philadelphia	PTC	1953	–	Operated by PATCO Speedline since 1968
15–16th & Locust	Bridge	Center City, Philadelphia	Philadelphia	PTC	1953	–	Operated by PATCO Speedline since 1968
24th Street	MFL	Center City, Philadelphia	Philadelphia	PRT	1907	1956	Replaced by 22nd Street; 24th Street B&O Station
32nd Street	MFL	West Philadelphia, Philadelphia	Philadelphia	PRT	1907	1956	Replaced by 30th Street
36th Street	MFL	West Philadelphia, Philadelphia	Philadelphia	PRT	1907	1956	Replaced by 34th Street
40th Street	MFL	West Philadelphia, Philadelphia	Philadelphia	PRT	1907	1956	Replaced by 40th Street
Broadway	Bridge	Camden	Camden	PRT	1936	–	Owned by PATCO Speedline since 1968; Connection to River Line Light Rail
City Hall (Camden)	Bridge	Camden	Camden	PRT	1936	–	Owned by PATCO Speedline since 1968
Fairmount Avenue	MFL	Lower North Philadelphia	Philadelphia	PRT	1922	1977	Replaced by Spring Garden in 1977
Franklin Square	Bridge	Center City, Philadelphia	Philadelphia	PRT	1936	–	Owned by PATCO Speedline since 1968
Market–Chestnut	Ferry	Center City, Philadelphia	Philadelphia	PRT	1908	1939	
Shisler Avenue	102	Aldan	Delaware	P&WCTC	1906	2010	
South Street	Ferry	Center City, Philadelphia	Philadelphia	PRT	1908	1939	
Spring Garden	Spur	Center City, Philadelphia	Philadelphia	PRT	1932	1991	

== Future stations ==
Various extension and infill stations with platforms will be added to the D and T trolley lines as part of SEPTA's Trolley Modernization Plan.
