= Beverly Boulevard station =

Beverly Blvd
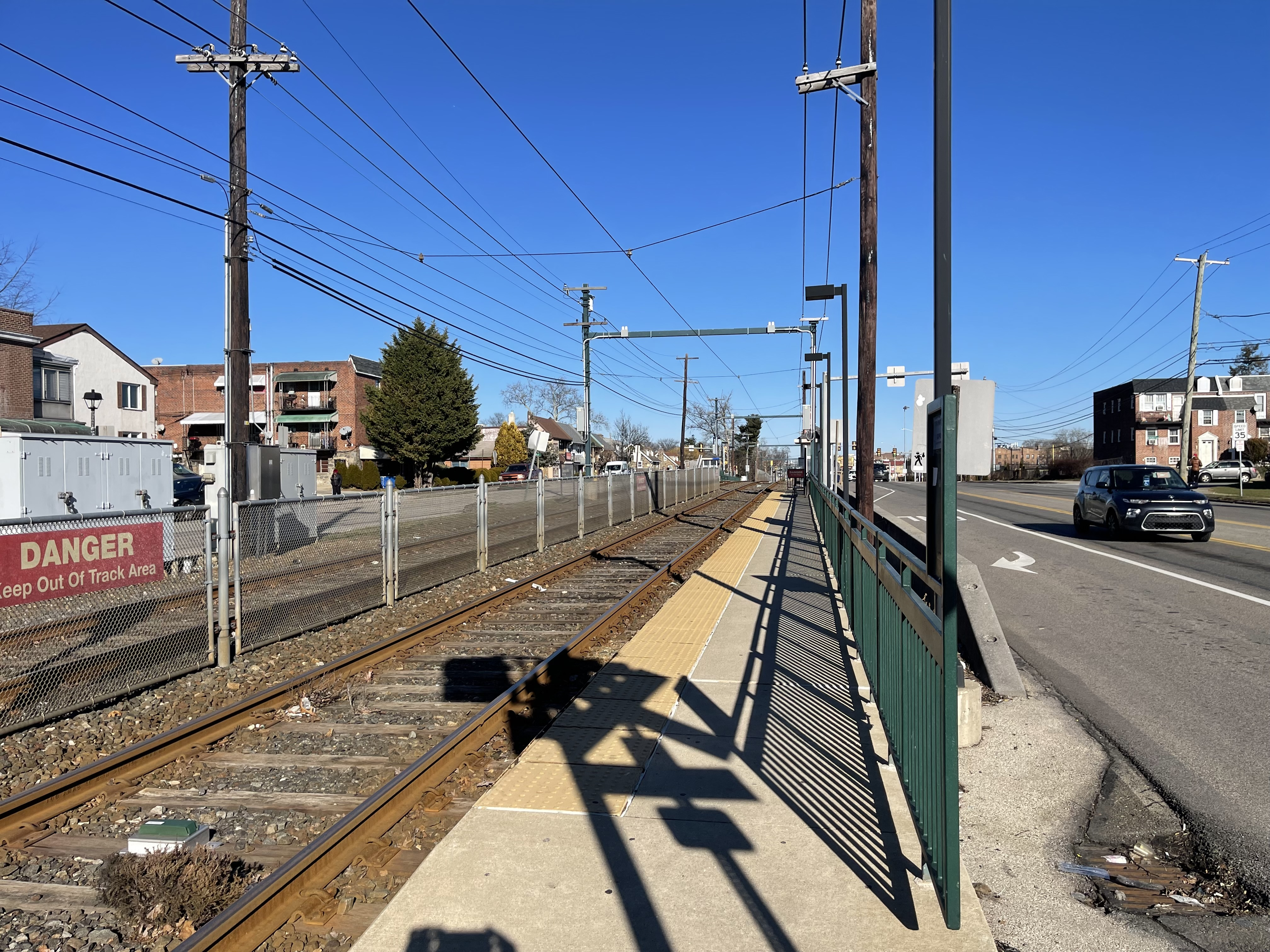

General information
- Location: Garrett Road & Bywood Avenue; Upper Darby Township, Pennsylvania
- Coordinates: 39.9553°N 75.2743°W
- Owner: SEPTA
- Platforms: 2 side platforms
- Tracks: 2

Construction
- Structure type: Open shelters
- Parking: No
- Cycle facilities: No
- Accessible: No

History
- Electrified: Overhead lines
- Former names: Beverly Hills

Services
Preceding station	SEPTA Metro	Following station
Congress Avenue toward Orange Street/Media	D (SEPTA Metro)	Hilltop Road toward 69th Street T.C.
Congress Avenue toward Chester Pike/Sharon Hill	D (SEPTA Metro)	Hilltop Road toward 69th Street T.C.
Location

Beverly Boulevard station (formerly Beverly Hills) is a SEPTA Metro D station in Upper Darby Township, Pennsylvania. It is officially located at Garrett Road and Bywood Avenue, but also includes Beverly Boulevard. The station serves both the D1 and D2. Only local service is provided on both lines. The station contains two platforms with plexiglass bus-type shelters on both sides of the tracks.

Trolleys arriving at this station travel between 69th Street Transportation Center further east in Upper Darby and either Orange Street in Media, Pennsylvania for the D1, or Sharon Hill, Pennsylvania for the D2. Both lines run parallel to Garrett Road and Bywood Avenue, a one-way street that runs west from the Fairfield Avenue station. Beverly Hills is the westernmost stop where the lines runs parallel to both streets.

Beverly Boulevard Station is located at the east end of the Beverly Hills Trestle, which originally went over a former right-of-way of the Newtown Square Branch of the Pennsylvania Railroad, a line that ended just west of Fernwood–Yeadon station on the Media/Wawa Line. That ROW is now part of Naylors Run Park. Beverly Hills station is also one block west of the Hilltop Road station.
