= Lansdowne Avenue station =

Lansdowne Av
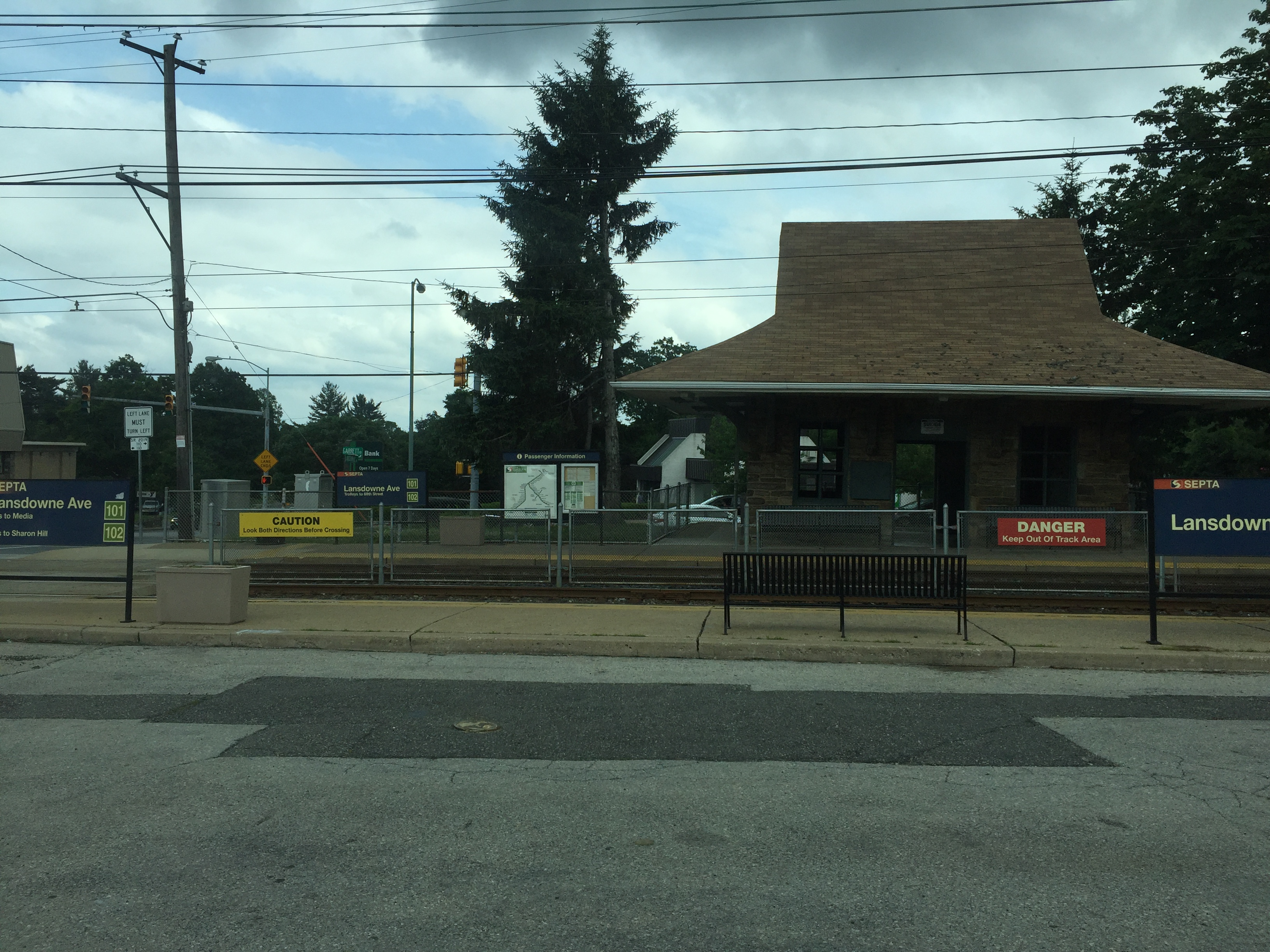
- The original P&W shelter across the tracks at Landsdowne Avenue MSHL station

General information
- Location: Garrett Road & Lansdowne Avenue; Upper Darby Township, Pennsylvania
- Coordinates: 39.9516°N 75.2825°W
- Owner: SEPTA
- Platforms: 2 side platforms
- Tracks: 2
- Connections: SEPTA Suburban Bus: 107, 115

Construction
- Structure type: Open stone shelter (Eastbound); Open acrylic glass shelter (Westbound)
- Accessible: No

History
- Electrified: Overhead lines

Services
Preceding station	SEPTA Metro	Following station
Drexel Park toward Orange Street/Media	D (SEPTA Metro)	Congress Avenue toward 69th Street T.C.
Drexel Park toward Chester Pike/Sharon Hill	D (SEPTA Metro)	Congress Avenue toward 69th Street T.C.
Location

Lansdowne Avenue station is a SEPTA Metro D stop in Upper Darby Township, Pennsylvania. It is located at Garrett Road and Lansdowne Avenue, and serves both the D1 and D2. The station has one shed with a roofed waiting area on the inbound side and a newer plastic and steel bus type shelter on the outbound side. One of the station's two platforms is located on the corner of Lansdowne Avenue and Winding Way.

Trolleys arriving at this station travel between 69th Street Transit Center in Upper Darby Township, Pennsylvania and either Orange Street in Media, Pennsylvania for the D1, or Sharon Hill, Pennsylvania for the D2. It serves as a stop for both local and express lines, and all lines run parallel to Garrett Road. The station is near a local YMCA branch and two Catholic high schools: The Monsignor Bonner High School for boys and the Archbishop Prendergast High School for girls. Both schools merged to form a co-ed campus in 2012. Lansdowne Avenue's shelters consist of a standard Red Arrow-era stone shed on the southwest corner of the grade crossing, and an open plexiglas bus stop type shelter on the northwest corner of the grade crossing.
