= Springfield Road station =

Springfield Road station may refer to:

- Brookside–Springfield station, a SEPTA Metro light rail station in Springfield Township, Delaware County, Pennsylvania
- Springfield–Madison, a SEPTA Metro light rail station in Clifton Heights, Pennsylvania
- Springfield Road station, a former police and British Army station on Springfield Road, Belfast

== See also ==
- Springfield Road (disambiguation)
