= Walnut Street station (SEPTA) =

Walnut St
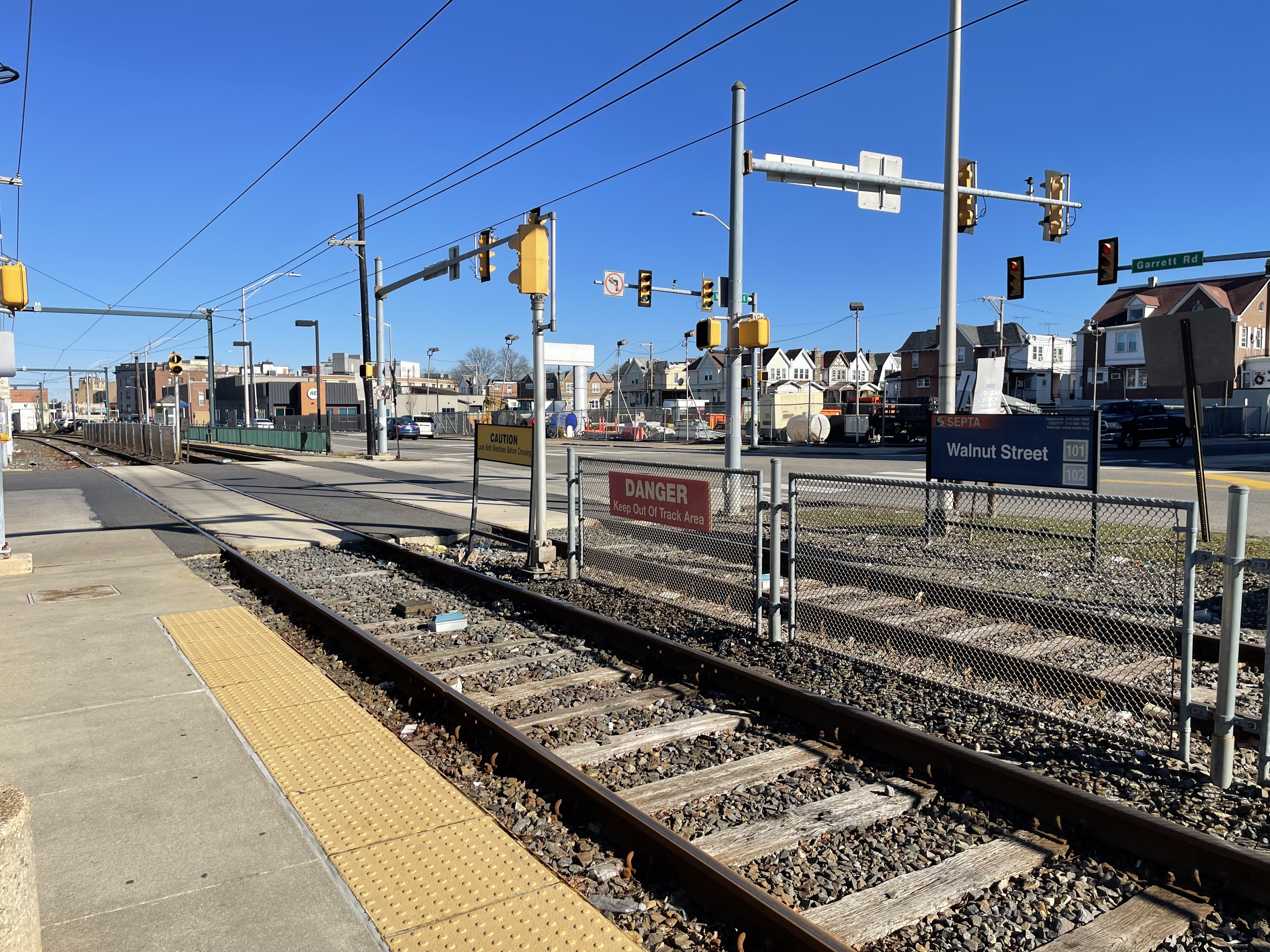

General information
- Location: Garrett Road & Walnut Street; Upper Darby Township, Pennsylvania
- Coordinates: 39.9589°N 75.2665°W
- Owner: SEPTA
- Platforms: 2 side platforms
- Tracks: 2

Construction
- Structure type: Open shelters
- Accessible: No

History
- Electrified: Overhead lines

Services
Preceding station	SEPTA Metro	Following station
Avon Road toward Orange Street/Media	D (SEPTA Metro)	Fairfield Avenue toward 69th Street T.C.
Avon Road toward Chester Pike/Sharon Hill	D (SEPTA Metro)	Fairfield Avenue toward 69th Street T.C.
Location

Walnut Street station is a SEPTA Metro D stop in Upper Darby Township, Pennsylvania. It is officially located at Garrett Road and Walnut Street, but Bywood Avenue is also included as it parallels the north side of the line. The station serves both the D1 and D2, and only local service is provided on both lines. The station contains two platforms with plexiglass bus-type shelters on both sides of the tracks, both of which are at the far end of each platform.

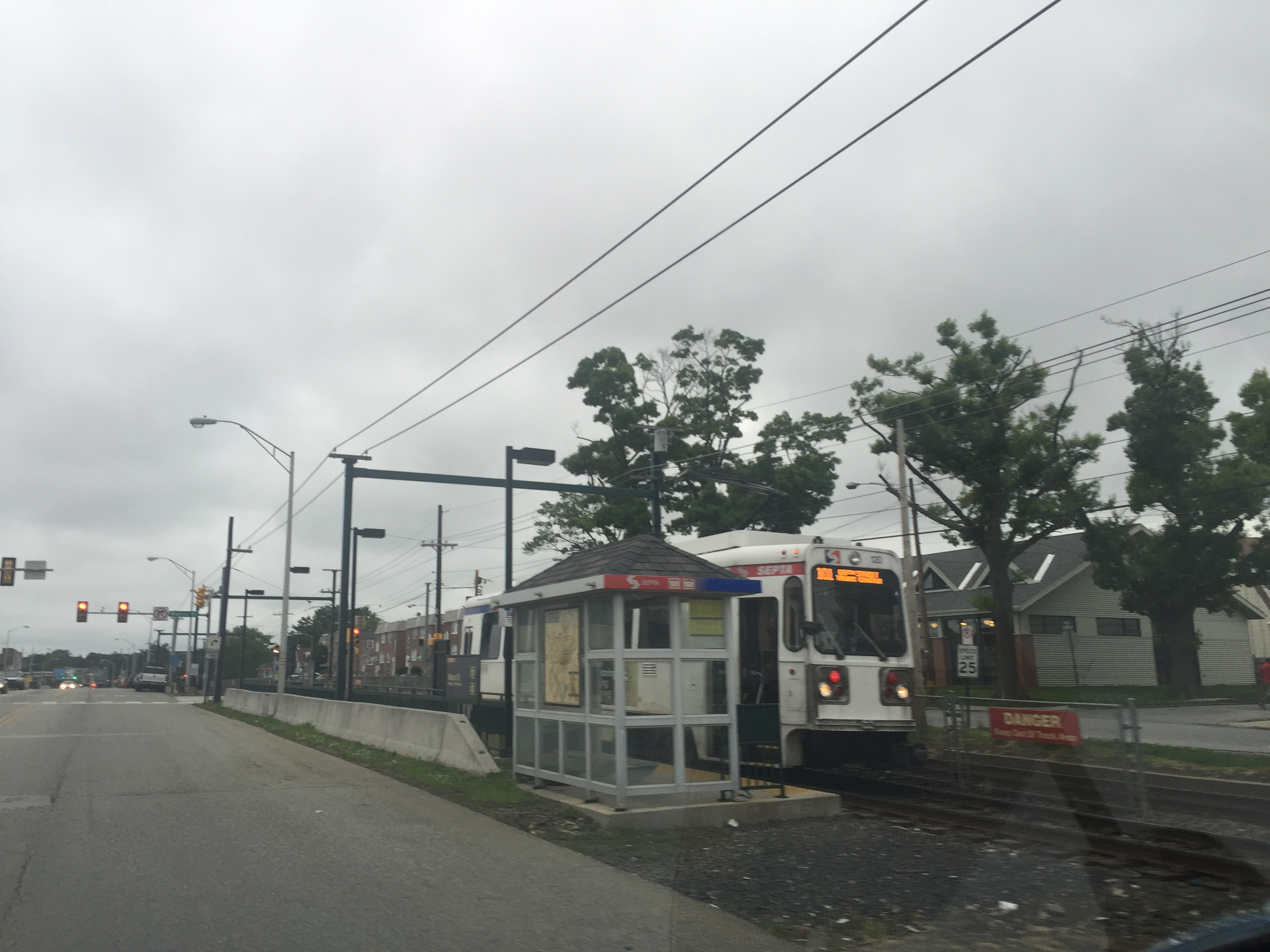
Another view of the station with the D1 trolley.

Trolleys arriving at this station travel between 69th Street Transportation Center further east in Upper Darby and either Orange Street in Media, Pennsylvania, for the D1, or Sharon Hill, Pennsylvania, for the D2. Both lines run parallel to Garrett Road and Bywood Avenue on private right-of-way, and Walnut Street is the easternmost stop where the lines run parallel to both streets. The station is located west of the Upper Darby Township Municipal Library.
