= Hilltop Road station =

Hilltop Rd
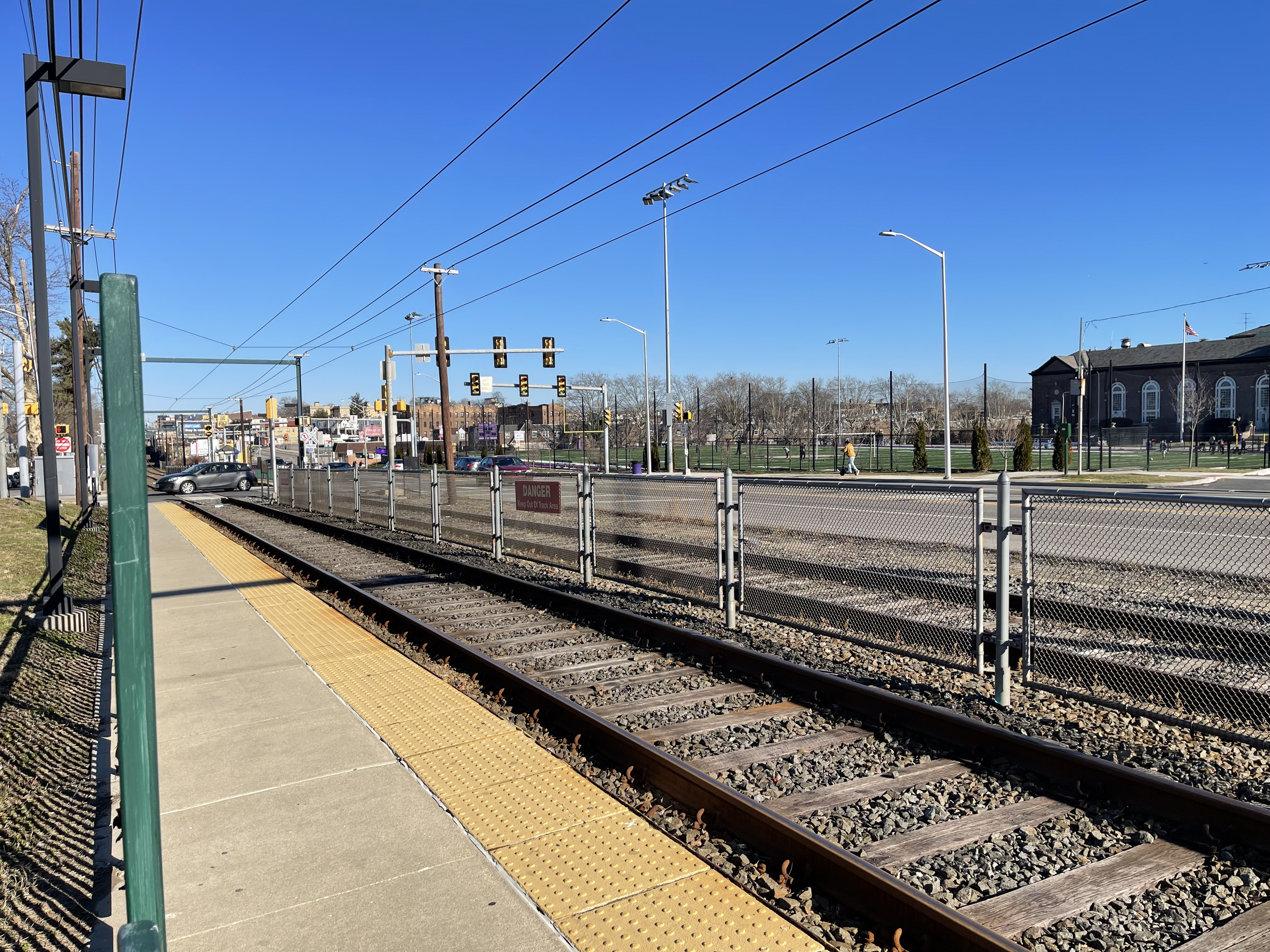

General information
- Location: Garrett Road & Hilltop Road; Upper Darby Township, Pennsylvania
- Coordinates: 39.9559°N 75.2729°W
- Owner: SEPTA
- Platforms: 2 side platforms
- Tracks: 2

Construction
- Structure type: Open shelters
- Accessible: No

History
- Electrified: Overhead lines

Services
Preceding station	SEPTA Metro	Following station
Beverly Boulevard toward Orange Street/Media	D (SEPTA Metro)	Avon Road toward 69th Street T.C.
Beverly Boulevard toward Chester Pike/Sharon Hill	D (SEPTA Metro)	Avon Road toward 69th Street T.C.
Location

Hilltop Road station is a SEPTA Metro D station in Upper Darby Township, Pennsylvania. It is officially located at Garrett Road and Hilltop Road, but also includes Bywood Avenue as it parallels the north side of the line. The station serves both the D1 and D2, and only local service is provided on both lines. The station contains two platforms with plexiglass bus-type shelters on both sides of the tracks, both of which are at the far end of each platform. The Beverly Hills Middle School is across from the south side of the station along Hilltop Road.

Trolleys arriving at this station travel between 69th Street Transit Center further east in Upper Darby and either Orange Street in Media, Pennsylvania for the D1 line, or Sharon Hill, Pennsylvania for the D2 line. Both lines run parallel to Garrett Road and Bywood Avenue, however the run along Garrett Road is interrupted by a curve between Sherbrook Boulevard and Avon Road. Hilltop Road station is also one block east of the Beverly Boulevard station.
