= Garrettford station =

Garrettford
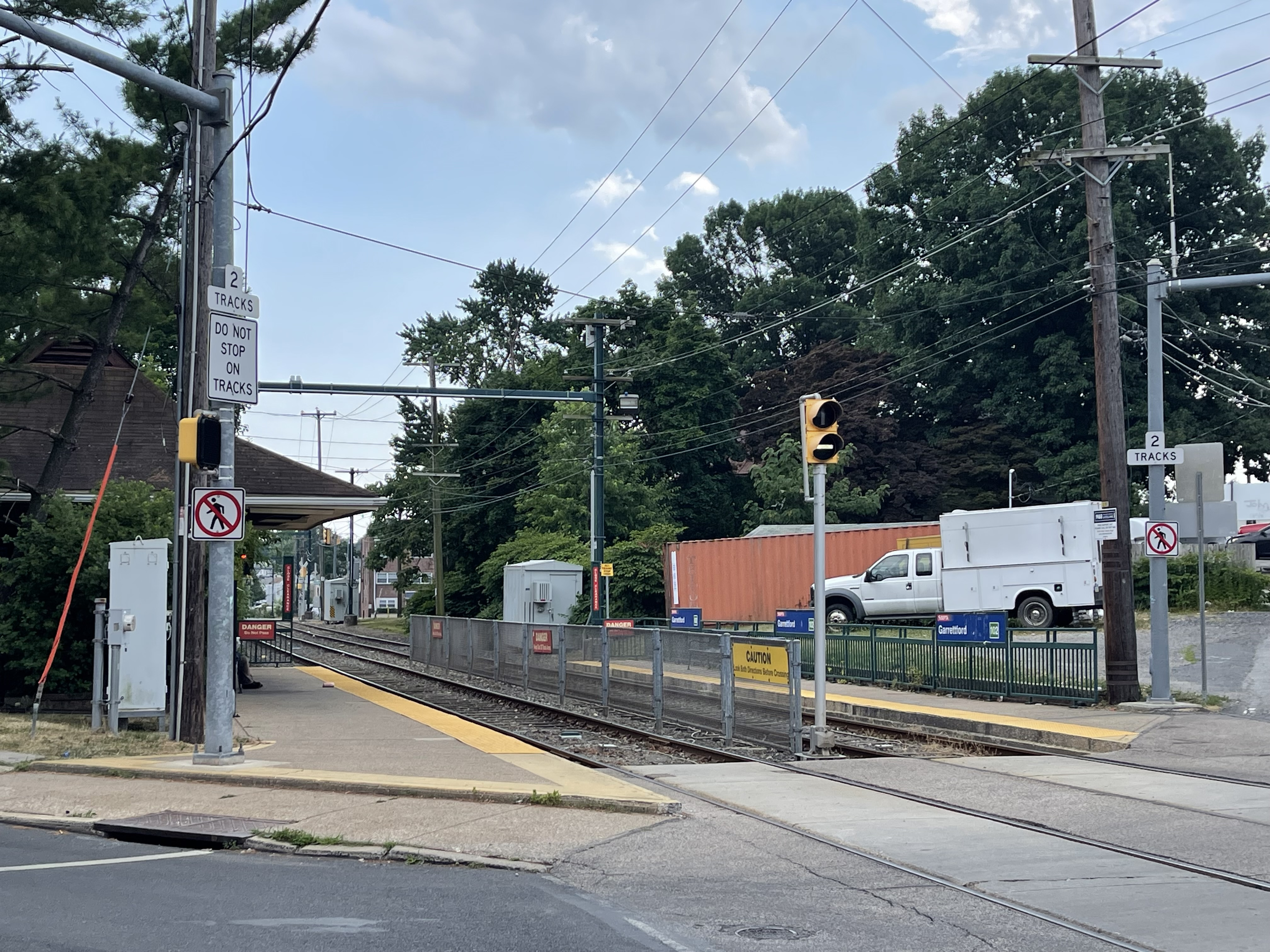
- Garretford station

General information
- Location: Edmonds Avenue & Garrett Road; Drexel Hill, Pennsylvania.
- Coordinates: 39.944°N 75.296°W
- Owner: SEPTA
- Platforms: 2 side platforms
- Tracks: 2

Construction
- Accessible: No

History
- Electrified: Overhead lines

Services
Preceding station	SEPTA Metro	Following station
Drexel Manor toward Chester Pike/Sharon Hill	D (SEPTA Metro)	Drexel Hill Junction toward 69th Street T.C.
Location

Garrettford station is a stop on the D in Drexel Hill, Pennsylvania. It is officially located at Edmonds Avenue and Garrett Road, however, the actual location is at the intersection of Edmonds Avenue, Jones Street and Mill Lane, which is south of Garrett Road. The trolley line crosses the aforementioned intersection at the southwest corner of Edmonds Avenue and Jones Street, to the northeast corner of Edmonds Avenue and Mill Lane.

Trolleys arriving at this station travel between 69th Street Transit Center in Upper Darby Township, Pennsylvania and Sharon Hill, Pennsylvania. Garrettford is the first/last stop along the D2 that doesn't share a right of way with the D1 to Media, Pennsylvania. The station has a shed with a roof where people can go inside when it is raining. This shed is located on the southwest corner of Edmonds Avenue & Jones Street along the east side of the tracks. An abandoned parking lot exists at the southeast corner of Edmonds Avenue & Garrett Road along the west side of the tracks.
