= Avon Road station =

Train station in Pennsylvania

Avon Rd
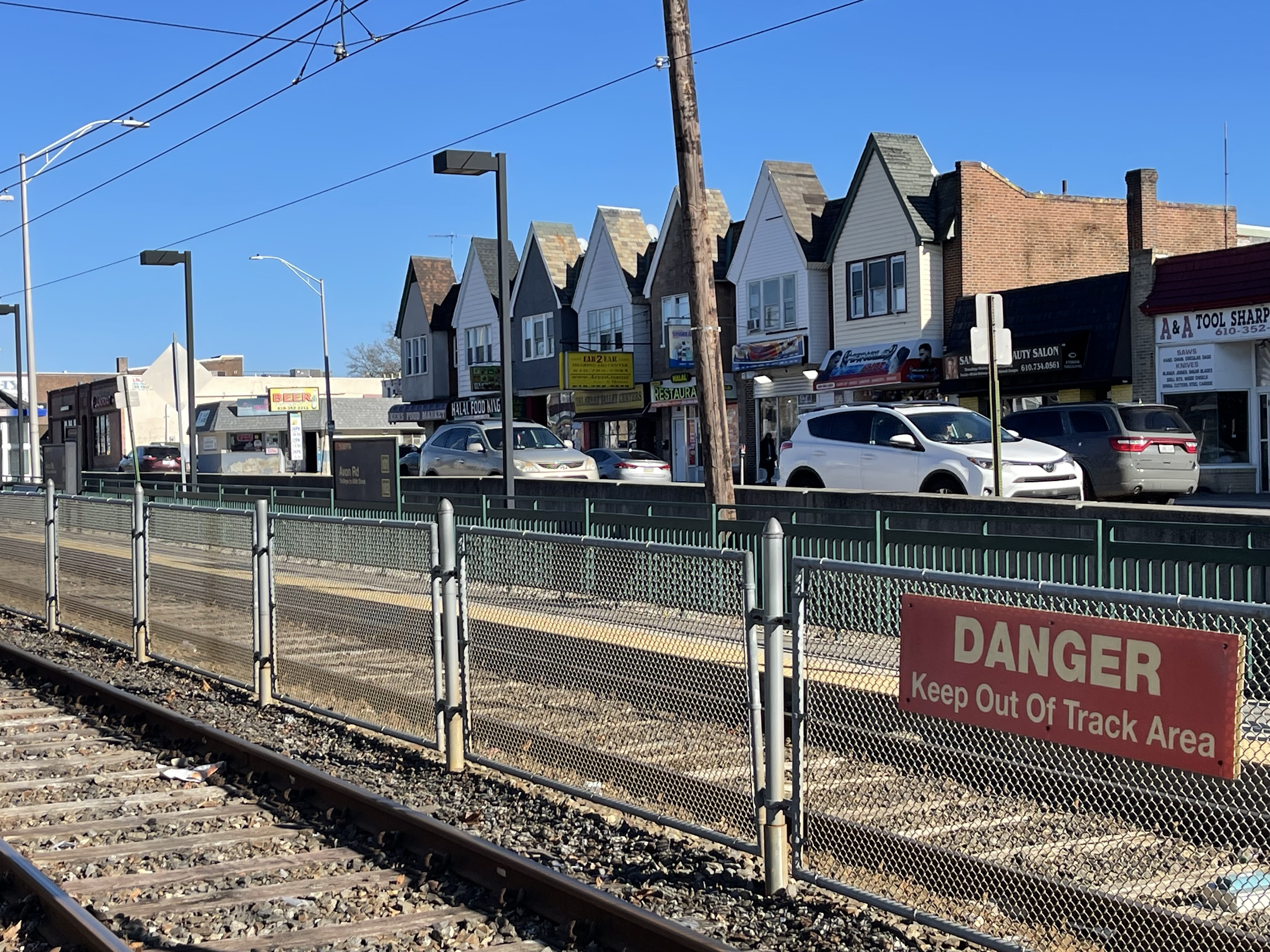

General information
- Location: Garrett Road & Avon Road; Upper Darby Township, Pennsylvania
- Coordinates: 39.9577°N 75.2691°W
- Owner: SEPTA
- Platforms: 2 side platforms
- Tracks: 2

Construction
- Structure type: Open shelters
- Parking: No
- Accessible: No

History
- Electrified: Overhead lines
- Former names: Bywood

Services
Preceding station	SEPTA Metro	Following station
Hilltop Road toward Orange Street/Media	D (SEPTA Metro)	Walnut Street toward 69th Street T.C.
Hilltop Road toward Chester Pike/Sharon Hill	D (SEPTA Metro)	Walnut Street toward 69th Street T.C.
Location

Avon Road station (formerly Bywood) is a SEPTA Metro D station in Upper Darby Township, Pennsylvania, United States. It is officially located at Garrett Road & Avon Road, but Bywood Avenue is also included as it parallels the north side of the line. The station serves both Routes D1 and D2, and only local service is provided on both lines. The station contains two platforms with plexiglass bus-type shelters on both sides of the tracks, both of which are at the far end of each platform. A former Red Arrow Lines-era shelter exists across the tracks from the westbound platform, but it is completely closed and boarded up. This was formerly the inbound platform before the newer inbound platform was moved to the far side after the Avon Road grade crossing.

Trolleys arriving at this station travel between 69th Street Transit Center further east in Upper Darby and either Orange Street in Media, Pennsylvania for the D1, or Sharon Hill, Pennsylvania for the D2. Both lines run parallel to Garrett Road and Bywood Avenue, however the run along Garrett Road is interrupted by a curve between Sherbrook Boulevard and Avon Road.
