= Congress Avenue station =

Congress Av
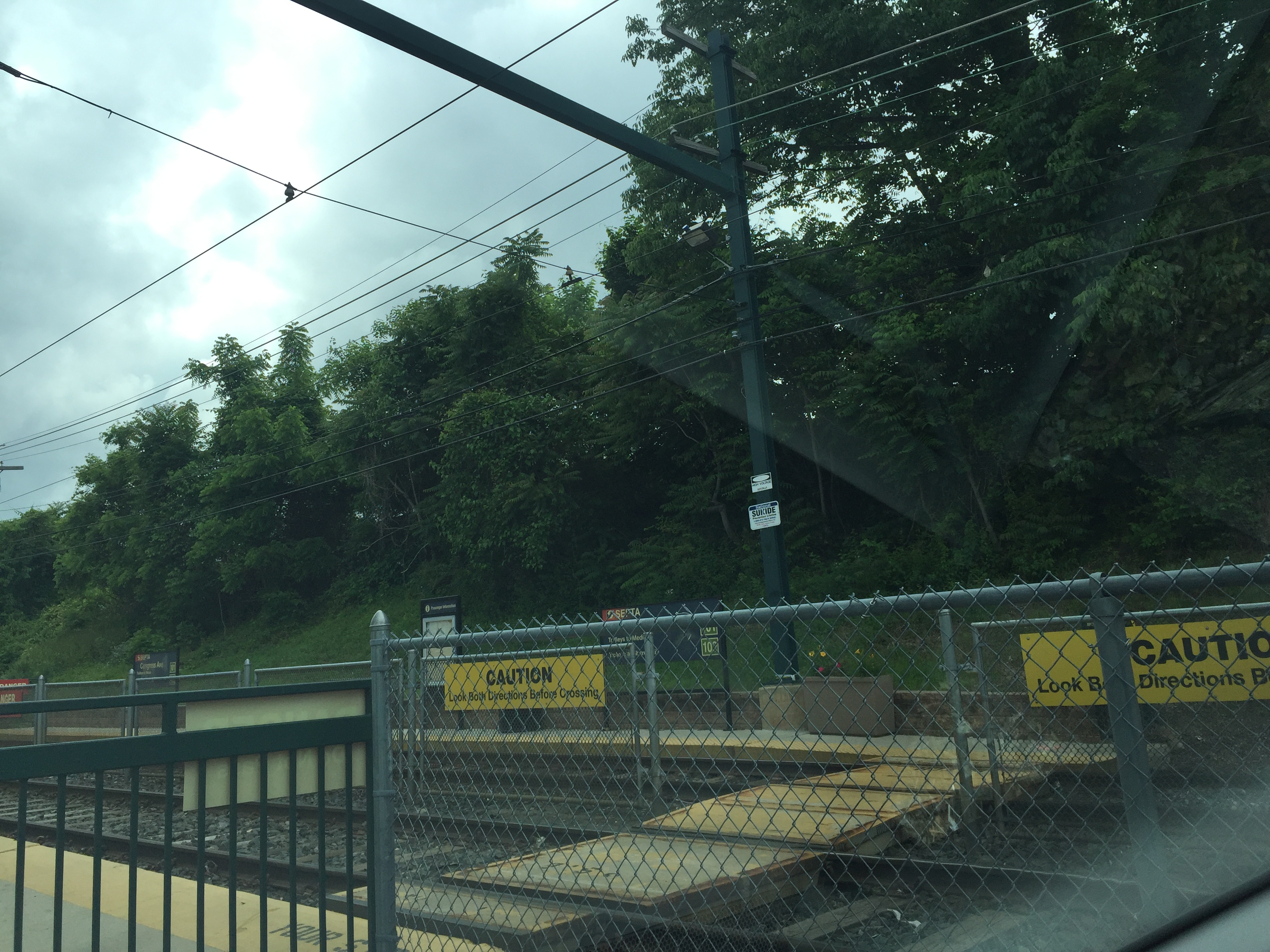

General information
- Location: Garrett Road & Congress Avenue; Upper Darby Township, Pennsylvania
- Coordinates: 39.9530°N 75.2792°W
- Owner: SEPTA
- Platforms: 2 side platforms
- Tracks: 2

Construction
- Structure type: Open shelter
- Accessible: No

History
- Electrified: Overhead lines

Services
Preceding station	SEPTA Metro	Following station
Lansdowne Avenue toward Orange Street/Media	D (SEPTA Metro)	Beverly Boulevard toward 69th Street T.C.
Lansdowne Avenue toward Chester Pike/Sharon Hill	D (SEPTA Metro)	Beverly Boulevard toward 69th Street T.C.
Location

Congress Avenue station is a SEPTA Metro D stop in Upper Darby Township, Pennsylvania. It is located at Garrett Road and Congress Avenue, and serves both Routes 101 and 102. Only local service is provided on both lines. The station is located on the north side of the terminus of the Congress Avenue intersection. It contains two platforms, but only one pre-fabricated shelter on the south side of the tracks.

Trolleys arriving at this station travel between 69th Street Transit Center in Upper Darby Township, Pennsylvania and either Orange Street in Media, Pennsylvania for the D1, or Sharon Hill, Pennsylvania for the D2. Both lines run parallel to Garrett Road. The station is an open stucco shelter on the south side of an athletic field shared by two Catholic high schools: the Monsignor Bonner High School for boys and the Archbishop Prendergast High School for girls.

Congress Avenue Station is located at the west end of the Beverly Hills Trestle, which originally went over a former right-of-way of the Newtown Square Branch of the Pennsylvania Railroad, a line that ended just west of Fernwood–Yeadon station on the Media/Wawa Line. That right of way is now part of Naylors Run Park.
