= Drexel Manor station =

Drexel Manor
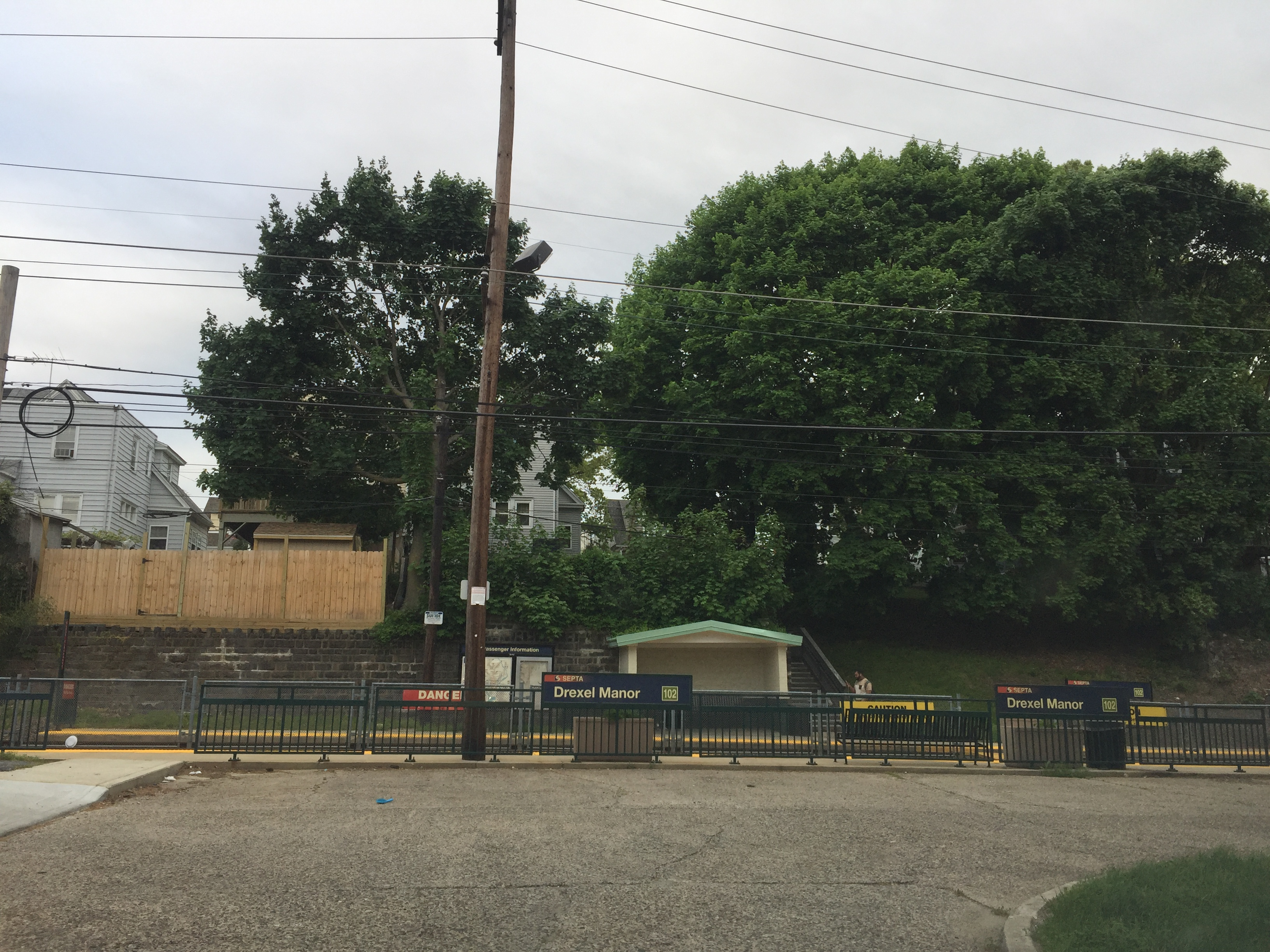
- Drexel Manor station

General information
- Location: Burmont and Cheswold Roads; Drexel Hill, Pennsylvania.
- Coordinates: 39.9422°N 75.2965°W
- Owner: SEPTA
- Platforms: 2 side platforms
- Tracks: 2

Construction
- Structure type: Open shelter
- Accessible: No

History
- Electrified: Overhead lines

Services
Preceding station	SEPTA Metro	Following station
Marshall Road toward Chester Pike/Sharon Hill	D (SEPTA Metro)	Garrettford toward 69th Street T.C.
Location

Drexel Manor station is a station on the D in Drexel Hill, Pennsylvania. The station is officially located near Burmont Road and Cheswold Road, although it is actually southwest of the Burmont Road grade crossing. Like the Marshall Road station, the D2 runs in between Cheswold and Blanchard Roads, both of which terminate at Burmont Road. Two schools are located in the vicinity of this station.

Trolleys arriving at this station travel between 69th Street Transit Center in Upper Darby Township, Pennsylvania and Sharon Hill, Pennsylvania. The station contains an open concrete shelter on the northbound platform of the tracks with a connecting sidewalk between two houses on Blanchard Road. On the opposite side, the southbound platform can be found in front of a parking lot for a housing project across from the intersection of Cheswold and Lasher Roads.

The given location of the station house contains little to indicate actual rail service besides a grade crossing at Burmout Road A vacant lot on the southeast corner of the Burmont Road grade crossing once contained a gravel parking lot, and the northeast corner of the crossing contains another vacant lot with a signal cabinet. A sidewalk along Cheswold Road leads to the platform, and a retaining wall across the tracks may or may not have included another one at one time. Drexel Manor station is located two blocks southwest of the Garrettford station.
