= Marshall Road station =

Marshall Rd
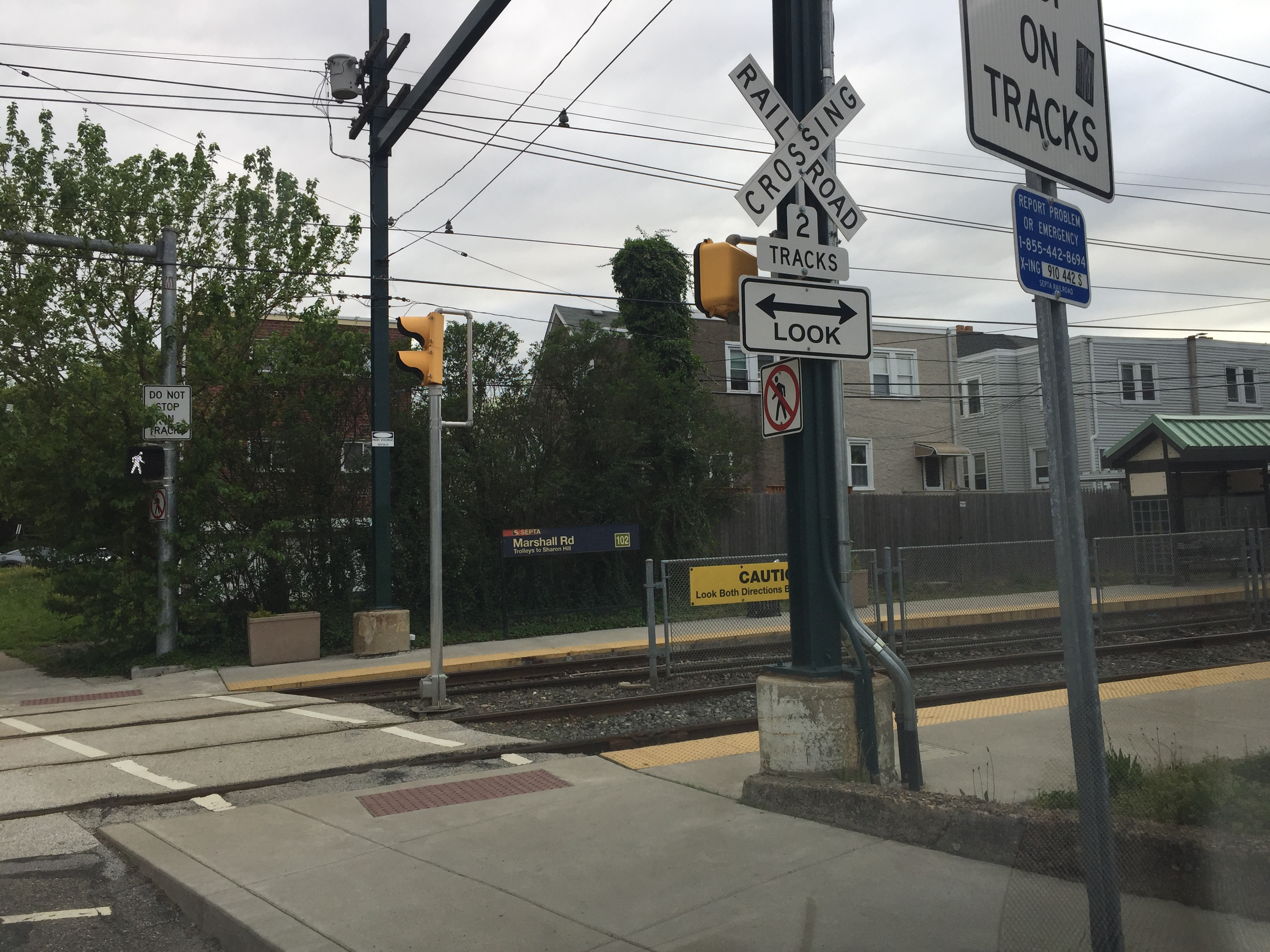

General information
- Location: Near Marshall & Cheswold Roads; Drexel Hill, Pennsylvania.
- Coordinates: 39.9402°N 75.2965°W
- Owner: SEPTA
- Platforms: 2 side platforms
- Tracks: 2

Construction
- Structure type: Open shelter
- Accessible: No

History
- Electrified: Overhead lines

Services
Preceding station	SEPTA Metro	Following station
Creek Road toward Chester Pike/Sharon Hill	D (SEPTA Metro)	Drexel Manor toward 69th Street T.C.
Location

Marshall Road station is a stop on the D in Drexel Hill, Pennsylvania. It is between Cheswold and Blanchard Roads on Marshall Road.

Trolleys arriving at this station travel between 69th Street Transit Center in Upper Darby Township, Pennsylvania and Sharon Hill, Pennsylvania. The station has a shed with a roof where people can go inside when it is raining on one platform and a bench on the other. Both platforms are on the north side of the Marshall Road grade crossing only. Because the stop is in a residential area, no parking is available.
