= Paper Mill Road station =

SEPTA trolley station

Paper Mill Rd
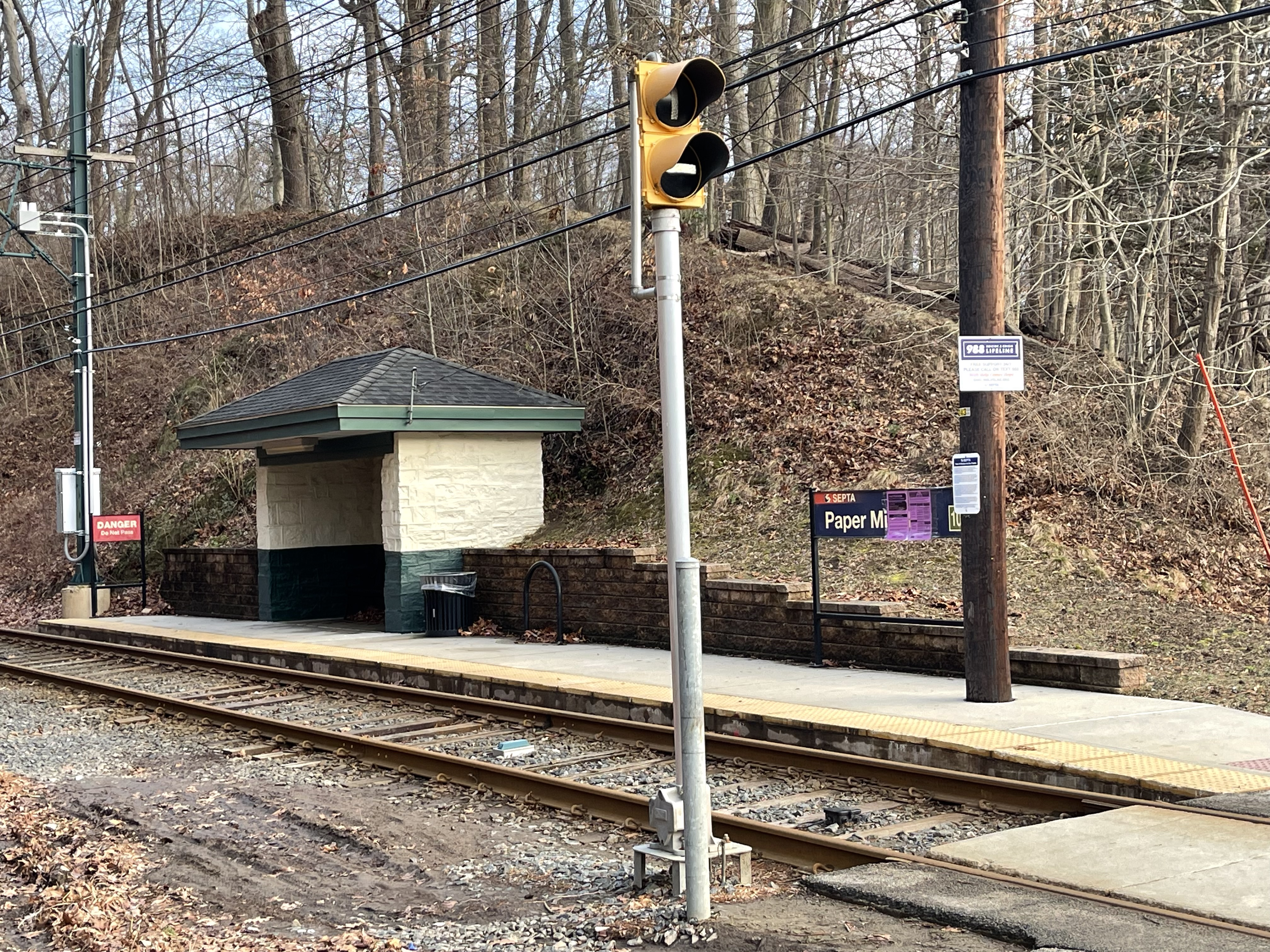
- Paper Mill Road station

General information
- Location: Paper Mill Road at Smedley Park; Springfield, Pennsylvania
- Coordinates: 39.9154°N 75.3579°W
- Owner: SEPTA
- Platforms: 1 side platform
- Tracks: 1

Construction
- Parking: Yes
- Accessible: No

History
- Electrified: Overhead lines

Services
Preceding station	SEPTA Metro	Following station
Pine Ridge toward Orange Street/Media	D (SEPTA Metro)	Springfield Mall toward 69th Street T.C.
Location

Paper Mill Road station is a station on the D in Springfield Township, Delaware County, Pennsylvania. It is located on Paper Mill Road at Smedley Park. Smedley Park named after Samuel L. Smedley, the local founder of the Delaware County Parks and Recreation Board.

Trolleys arriving at this station travel between 69th Street Transit Center in Upper Darby Township, Pennsylvania and Orange Street in Media, Pennsylvania. As part of a major line renovation project in 2010 the shelter at the stop was re-roofed and painted, and a metal bench and platform plantings were added, providing passengers a pleasant waiting area and shelter from the elements. It also has free parking. However these are facilities of Smedley Park, rather than of SEPTA. No elevated platforms exist at this station. Unlike most stops along the D1 in Springfield, the Paper Mill Road stop is located along a section of single track that takes the line through wooded parkland west from Woodland Avenue to the western limit of the township (the Crum Creek Bridge) and a few hundred yards further into Nether Providence Township. Like station stops at Woodland Avenue, Thomson Road, Springfield Mall, and Bowling Green, passengers enter and leave the trolleys from the side of the single-track line where the shelter stands. At an isolated turnout in wooded Smedley Park in Nether Providence Township west of Paper Mill Road Station and east of Pine Ridge station, the line again becomes double-tracked for the stretch to the Media town border at Bowling Green station.

As of 2024, Paper Mill Road is the least used station on all of SEPTA, with 15 riders per day.
