= Saxer Avenue station =

Saxer Av
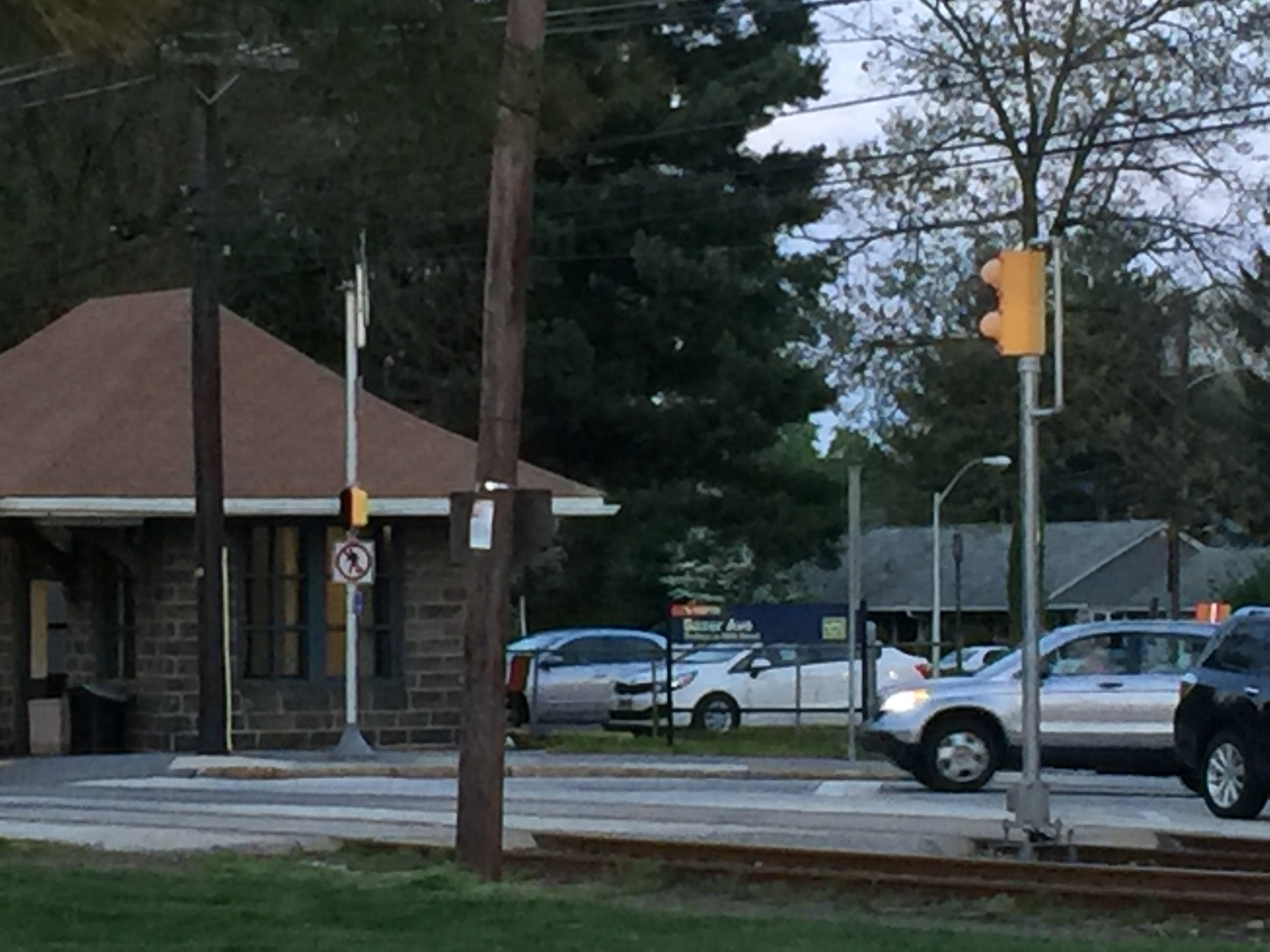

General information
- Location: Near Saxer Avenue and Rolling Road; Springfield, Pennsylvania.
- Coordinates: 39.9288°N 75.3335°W
- Owner: SEPTA
- Platforms: 2 side platforms
- Tracks: 2

Construction
- Parking: No
- Accessible: No

History
- Electrified: Overhead lines

Services
| Preceding station | SEPTA Metro | Following station |
|---|---|---|
| Leamy Avenue toward Orange Street/Media | D (SEPTA Metro) | Brookside–Springfield toward 69th Street T.C. |
Location

Saxer Avenue station is a stop on the D in Springfield Township, Delaware County, Pennsylvania. It is located near Saxer Avenue and Rolling Road.

Trolleys arriving at this station travel between 69th Street Transit Center in Upper Darby Township, Pennsylvania and Orange Street in Media, Pennsylvania. The station has a shed with a roof on the south side of the tracks where people can go inside when it is raining. No parking or bus service is available at this stop. While the south side of the tracks contain local businesses on Saxer Avenue, the north side is almost entirely residential.
