= D (SEPTA) =

Light rail line in Delaware County, Pennsylvania

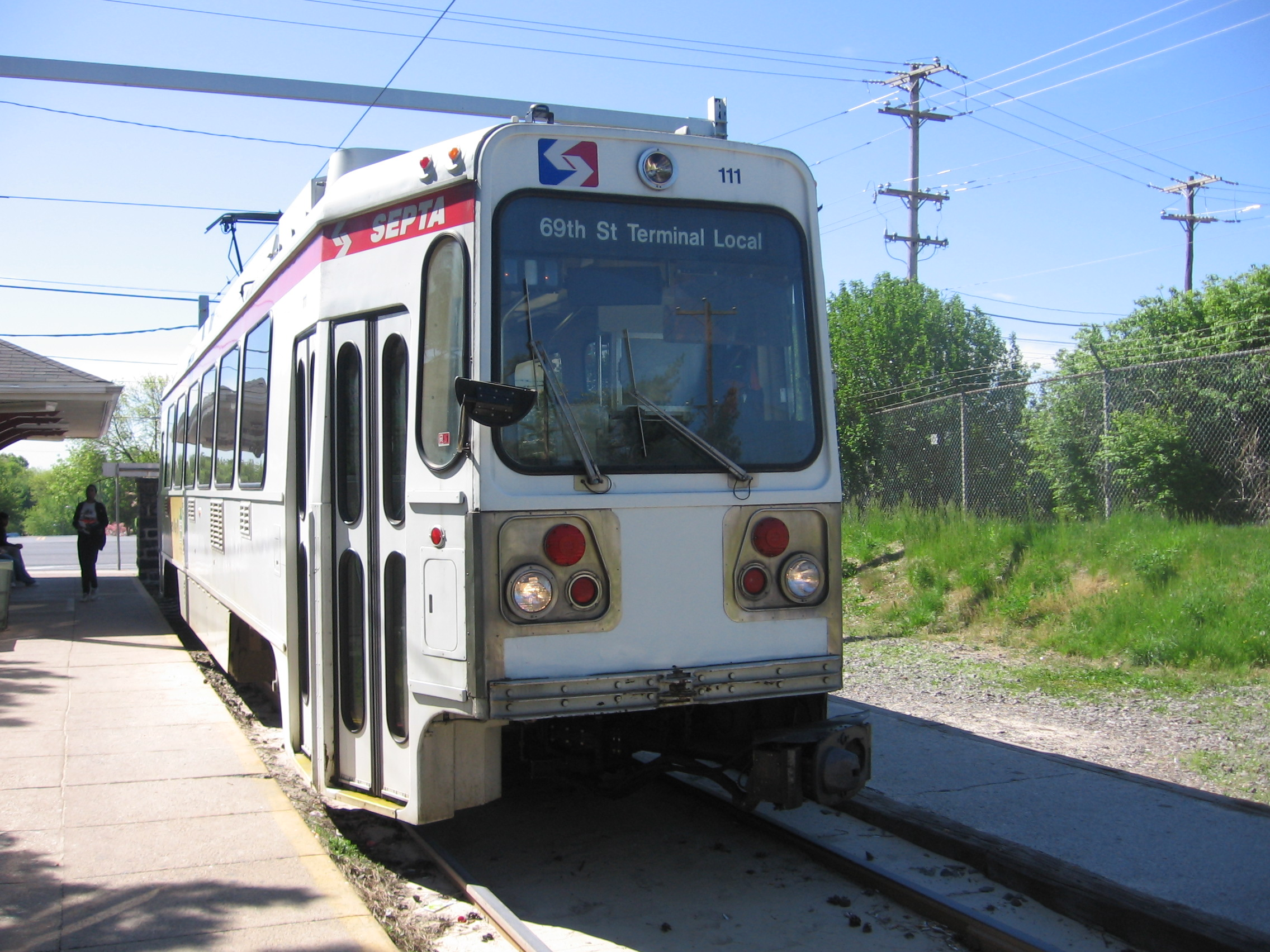
- D2 at Chester Pike/Sharon Hill station

Overview
- Locale: Delaware County, Pennsylvania
- Termini: 69th Street Transit Center; Orange Street/Media Chester Pike/Sharon Hill
- Stations: 40 surface level stations and 10 street-level stops
- Website: septa.org/schedules/D

Service
- Type: Light rail
- System: SEPTA Metro
- Services: Media; Sharon Hill
- Operator: SEPTA Suburban Division
- Rolling stock: SEPTA Series 100
- Daily ridership: 2,397; 2,791 (FY 2025)

History
- Opened: 1906

Technical
- Line length: 11.9 miles (19.2 km)
- Character: Surface (at-grade)
- Track gauge: 5 ft 2 1/2 in (1,588 mm) Pennsylvania trolley gauge
- Electrification: Overhead line, 600 V DC

The D, (Note: Conventions for line names state they are to be referred to by letter only (i.e. "the D", not "the D line")) the Media–Sharon Hill Line, formerly abbreviated as MSHL and numbered 101 and 102 (to Media and to Sharon Hill, respectively), is a light rail line in the SEPTA Metro network serving portions of Delaware County, Pennsylvania. The line comprises two services which terminate at 69th Street Transit Center in Upper Darby Township, Pennsylvania: D1 to Media and D2 to Sharon Hill. Service is operated by the Suburban Transit Division of the Southeastern Pennsylvania Transportation Authority (SEPTA). Altogether, the two services operate on approximately 11.9 miles (19.2 km) of route. The line is one of the few remaining interurban systems in the United States, along with the South Shore Line in Illinois and Indiana, the River Line in New Jersey, and the M, also in the Philadelphia area.

Along with the M, formerly the Philadelphia and Western Railroad, the routes are the remaining lines of the Red Arrow Lines Trolley System once operated by the Philadelphia Suburban Transportation Company (successor to the Philadelphia and West Chester Traction Company); some local residents still call them "Red Arrow".

The line uses 29 Kawasaki Heavy Industries Rolling Stock Company Type K LRV cars similar to those used on the T. However, unlike the city cars, the Type K cars on the D1 and D2 are double-ended and use pantograph collection instead of trolley poles.

== Route ==
Route	Length	South Terminal	North Terminal
(Formerly Route 101)	8.6 mi (13.8 km)	Media; Orange St at State St	Upper Darby; 69th St Transit Center
(Formerly Route 102)	5.3 mi (8.5 km)	Sharon Hill; Sharon Hill	Upper Darby; 69th St Transit Center

The D1 and D2 run together on their exclusive right of way in Upper Darby to Drexel Hill Junction for approximately 2 miles (3.2 km), at which point they diverge.

Map of Routes 101 and 102 (red), as well as former trolley (now bus) Routes 103 and 104 (orange), and Route 100 (blue)

The D1 continues on its own right of way traveling west and southwest through Drexel Hill and Springfield with an important stop at the Springfield Mall before entering the street in Media. The D1 has double tracks to Woodland Avenue, then a single track to just before Pine Ridge, then enters the street at Providence Road/Media in Media and runs on a single track the rest of the way. Cars in the street must yield to the trolley. The line terminates in the middle of the street just west of the Delaware County Courthouse.

The D2 runs southeast from Drexel Hill Junction through Drexel Hill and Clifton Heights and then goes into the street in Aldan. After Aldan, it returns to its own right-of-way, then passes through Collingdale before terminating at Chester Pike in Sharon Hill. The D2 has double tracks until up to North Street in Collingdale, where the D2 returns to its own right-of-way, and after North Street, there is a single track until the end of the line.

Springfield Road has one stop on each line. The D1 stops at Brookside–Springfield in Springfield. The D2 stops at Springfield Road in Clifton Heights, then runs within this street until it moves onto Woodlawn Avenue through Aldan.

== History ==
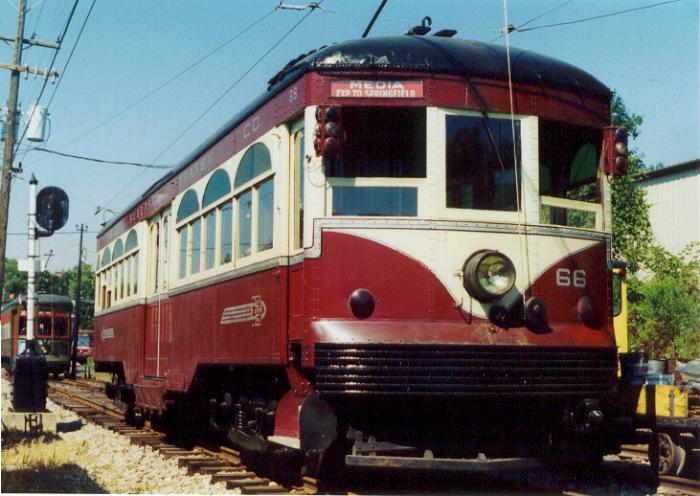
Heavy steel interurban cars like this ran on the Red Arrow until the 1970s

The Sharon Hill Line (D2) was originally built by the Philadelphia and West Chester Traction Company, and opened on March 15, 1906, and the Media Line (D1) was originally built by the same company, opening on April 1, 1913. The lines were later bought by the Philadelphia Suburban Transit Company in 1954.

Besides D1 and D2, there were also two other, now defunct, Red Arrow trolley lines. The direct ancestor of the SEPTA Route 104 bus line went to West Chester, splitting off from the rest of the system right after what is now the 69th Street Transit Center onto West Chester Pike. The tracks continued all the way up West Chester Pike. West Chester trolleys were replaced by buses in 1954 due to widening of West Chester Pike; rush-hour trips to Westgate Hills lasted until 1958. Tracks remained in use for access to the Red Arrow's carbarn in Llanerch until SEPTA closed the barn in 1971; all tracks were soon removed except for a portion near 69th Street that SEPTA occasionally uses to store out-of service trolleys. The other now-defunct Red Arrow trolley line went to Ardmore until December 1966. It split from the West Chester line at Llanerch and continued on its own exclusive right-of-way. Much of the right-of-way still remains between Schauffele Plaza in Ardmore (the former terminus of the line) and Eagle Road in Havertown, although the tracks were removed and the right-of-way paved for dedicated use by the replacement bus line, now SEPTA Route 103. The 103 still uses this private right-of-way, although much of its other street routing has changed.

On April 1, 2020, service on the then-Route 102 was suspended while the then-Route 101 was substituted with buses due to the COVID-19 pandemic. Trolley service on both routes resumed June 1, 2020.

In 2021, SEPTA proposed rebranding their rail transit service as "SEPTA Metro", to make the system easier to navigate. Under this proposal, the Media and Sharon Hill lines would have been rebranded as the "D" lines (for "Delaware", the county in which the trolley routes are located) with a pink color and numeric suffixes for each service. The 101 and 102 were to respectively be rebranded as the D1 69th St / Orange St and D2 69th St / Sharon Hill. After a period of public comment, SEPTA revised its plans to primarily refer to the line as the "D," the services as simply "D1" and "D2", as well as to rethink the name of the then-Route 101's "Orange Street" terminal station name.

=== Future rolling stock ===
In 2023, SEPTA awarded Alstom Transportation the contract to furbish 130 new low-floor trolleys, with an option for 30 more. The trolleys will be of Alstom's Citadis family and will be 80 feet in length and fully ADA-compliant, which the current Kawasaki trolleys from the early 1980s are not. The trolleys will be distributed among the D1 and D2 in Delaware County, and its subway-surface lines and G trolley in neighboring Philadelphia. The first trolley is expected to be delivered from Alstom in the Spring of 2027, with the last trolley to be delivered sometime in 2030.

With SEPTA Trolley Modernization in progress, SEPTA is proposing to extend the D2 to Darby Transit Center. This extension would connect the D2 with the T3 and T4.

== Media stops ==
Media is the western terminus of the D1 trolley line just west of the Orange Street intersection with State Street, the latter of which the trolley runs down the center line. Despite being located in the town, there is no direct connection to the Media station of the Media/Wawa Line which is a mile to the south on Orange Street and partly through a wooded area.

== Stations and stops ==
Location	Station/stop	Connections	Notes
(Media branch)
Media	Orange Street/Media	SEPTA Suburban Bus: 110	Route D1 western terminus
Media	Veterans Square		
Media	Olive Street		
Media	Jackson Street	SEPTA Suburban Bus: 118	
Media	Monroe Street		
Media	Edgemont Street		
Media	Manchester Avenue		
Media	Providence Road/Media		Begin right-of-way and two-track operation Formerly known as Bowling Green
Media	Beatty Road		
Springfield	Pine Ridge		Tracks converge east of here
Springfield	Paper Mill Road		Serves Smedley Park; SEPTA's least used station
Springfield	Springfield Mall	SEPTA Suburban Bus: 107, 109, 110	Formerly known as Sproul Road
Springfield	Thomson Avenue		
Springfield	Woodland Avenue		Resume two-track operation east of here
Springfield	Leamy Avenue		
Springfield	Saxer Avenue		
Springfield	Brookside–Springfield		
Springfield	Scenic Road		
Drexel Hill	Drexeline		
Drexel Hill	Drexelbrook		
Drexel Hill	Anderson Avenue		
Drexel Hill	Aronimink		
Drexel Hill	School Lane		
Drexel Hill	Huey Avenue		
(Sharon Hill branch)
Sharon Hill	Chester Pike/Sharon Hill	SEPTA Suburban Bus: 114, 115	Route D2 western terminus
Collingdale	MacDade Boulevard	SEPTA Suburban Bus: 113	Formerly known as Collingdale
Collingdale	Andrews Avenue		
Collingdale	Bartram Avenue		Located at Woodlawn and Bartram Avenues; located north of the historic former St. Joseph Parish Elementary School, which was converted into a retirement community.
Collingdale	North Street		Tracks leave right-of-way and merge with Woodlawn Avenue north of here
Aldan	Magnolia Avenue		
Aldan	Woodlawn–Providence		
Aldan	Shisler Avenue		Station closed on March 15, 2010
Clifton Heights	Clifton–Aldan	SEPTA Regional Rail:	Tracks transition onto Springfield Road
Clifton Heights	Springfield–Madison		Tracks leave Springfield Road for right-of-way south of here
Clifton Heights	Penn Street		
Clifton Heights	Baltimore Avenue	SEPTA Suburban Bus: 109	
Drexel Hill	Creek Road		Located in Indian Rock Park; Formerly known as Oakview
Drexel Hill	Marshall Road		
Drexel Hill	Drexel Manor		
Drexel Hill	Garrettford		
(trunk line)
Drexel Hill	Drexel Hill Junction	SEPTA Suburban Bus: 107	Also known as Shadeland Avenue; Routes D1 and D2 diverge west of here
Drexel Hill	Irvington Road		Bypassed by D1 rush hour express service
Drexel Hill	Drexel Park		Bypassed by D1 rush hour express service Also called Fairfax Road
Upper Darby	Lansdowne Avenue	SEPTA Suburban Bus: 107, 115	
Upper Darby	Congress Avenue		Bypassed by D1 rush hour express service
Upper Darby	Beverly Boulevard		Bypassed by D1 rush hour express service Formerly known as Beverly Hills
Upper Darby	Hilltop Road		Bypassed by D1 rush hour express service
Upper Darby	Avon Road		Bypassed by D1 rush hour express service Formerly known as Bywood
Upper Darby	Walnut Street		Bypassed by D1 rush hour express service
Upper Darby	Fairfield Avenue		Bypassed by D1 rush hour express service Tracks merge with street east of here
Upper Darby	69th Street Transit Center	SEPTA Metro: SEPTA City Bus: 21, 30, 65; SEPTA Suburban Bus: 103, 104, 105, 107, 108, 109, 110, 111, 112, 113, 120, 123, 126	
