= Fairfield Avenue station =

SEPTA trolley station

Fairfield Av
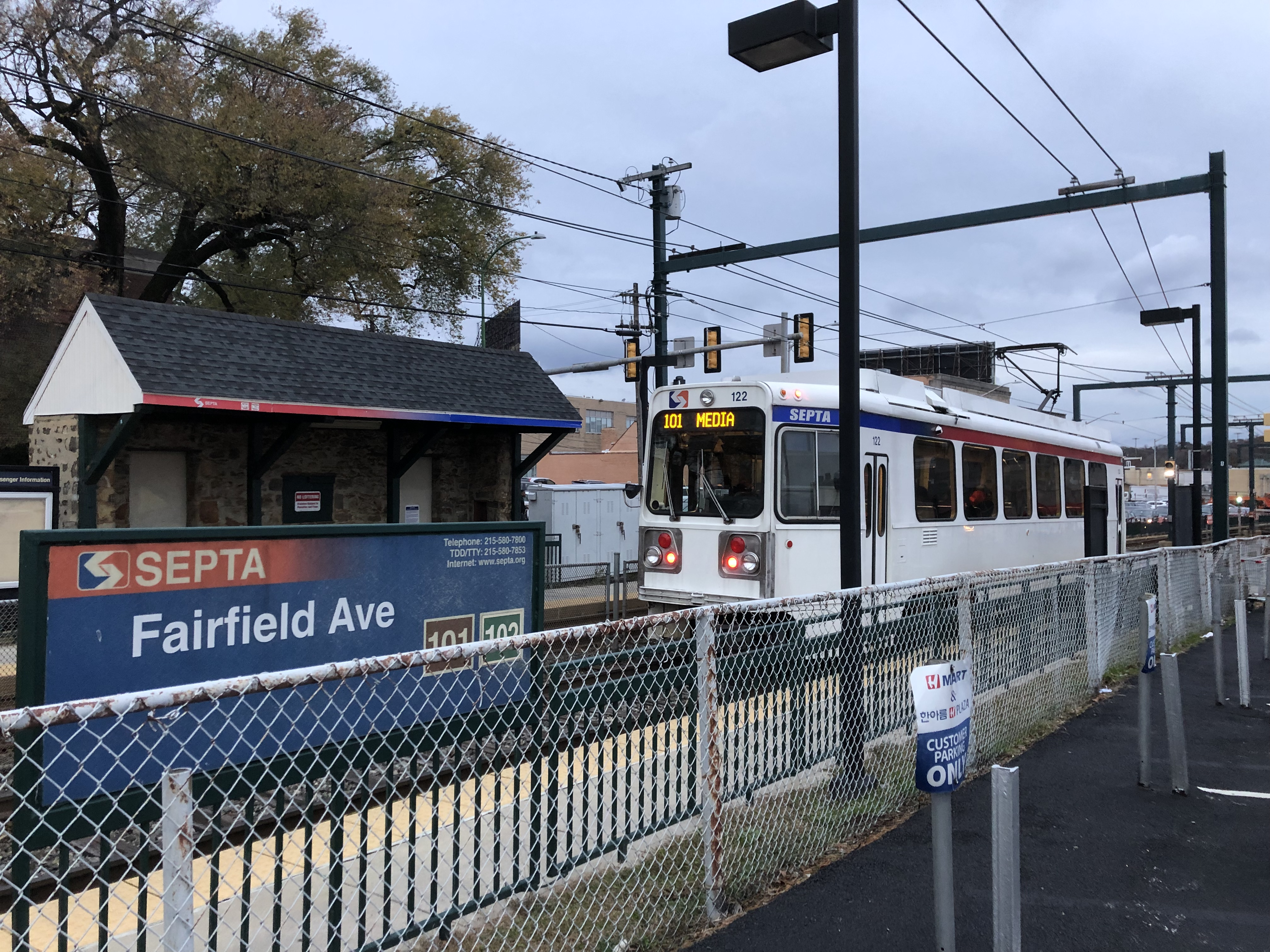
- Fairfield Avenue station in November 2018

General information
- Location: Fairfield Avenue and Terminal Square; Upper Darby Township, Pennsylvania
- Coordinates: 39.9607°N 75.2638°W
- Owner: SEPTA
- Platforms: 2 side platforms
- Tracks: 2

Construction
- Structure type: Open shelter
- Accessible: No

History
- Electrified: Overhead lines

Services
| Preceding station | SEPTA Metro | Following station |
|---|---|---|
| Walnut Street toward Orange Street/Media | D (SEPTA Metro) | 69th Street T.C. Terminus |
| Walnut Street toward Chester Pike/Sharon Hill | D (SEPTA Metro) | 69th Street T.C. Terminus |
Location

Fairfield Avenue station is a SEPTA Metro light rail station in Upper Darby Township, Pennsylvania. It is served by both services (D1 and D2) of the D. The station is located in a private right-of-way and has two side platforms. A stone shelter is located on the outbound (westbound) platform.
