= Brookside–Springfield station =

Brookside–Springfield
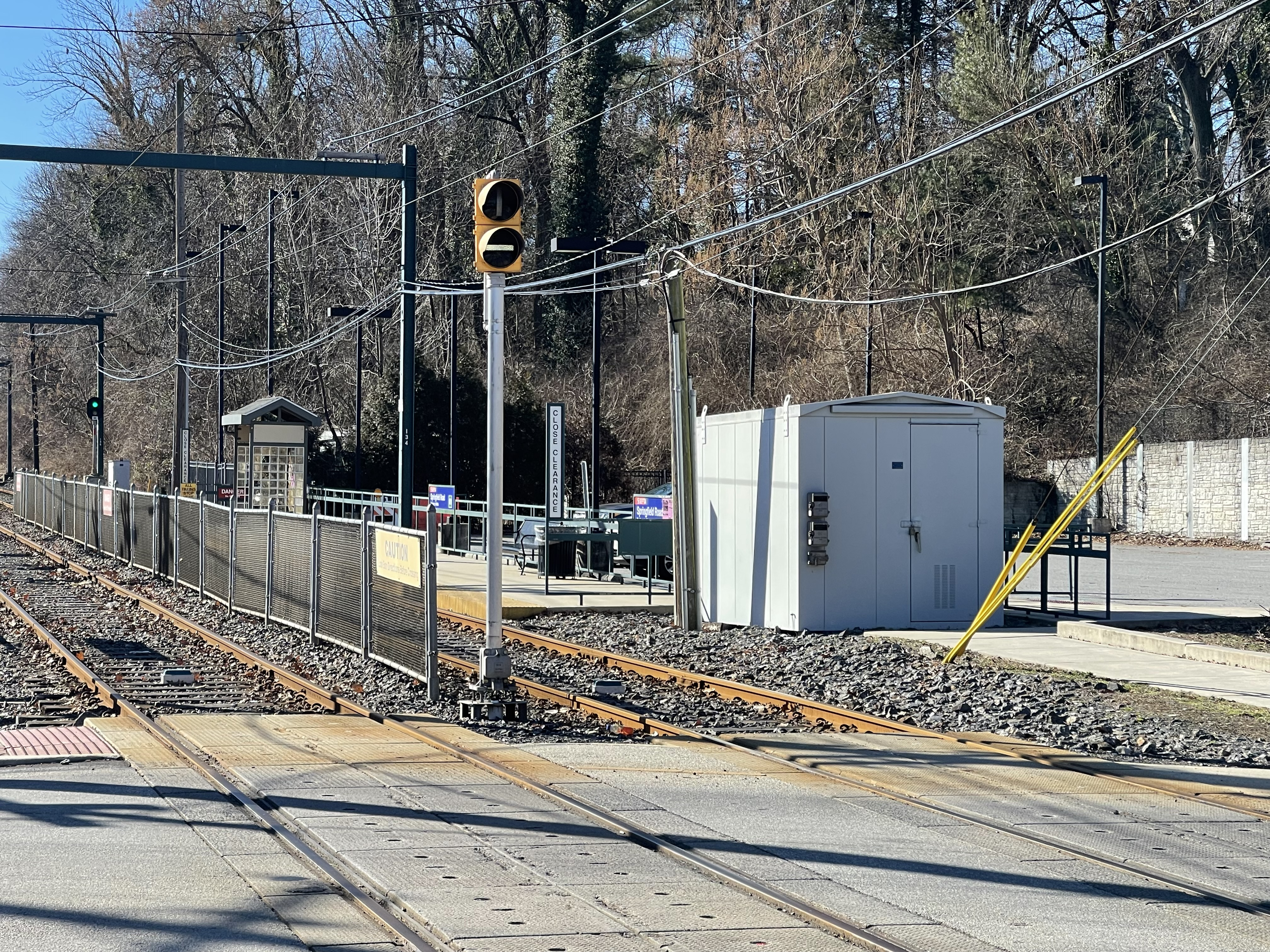

General information
- Location: Springfield Road at Windsor Circle; Springfield, Pennsylvania
- Coordinates: 39.9344°N 75.3296°W
- Owner: SEPTA
- Platforms: 2 side platforms
- Tracks: 2

Construction
- Parking: Yes
- Accessible: No

History
- Electrified: Overhead lines
- Former names: Springfield Road (–2025)

Services
Preceding station	SEPTA Metro	Following station
Saxer Avenue toward Orange Street/Media	D (SEPTA Metro)	Scenic Road toward 69th Street T.C.
Location

Brookside–Springfield station is a stop on the D in Springfield Township, Delaware County, Pennsylvania. It is located on Springfield Road between Windsor Circle and North Brookside Road, although SEPTA gives the address as being near Springfield and Rolling Roads.

Trolleys arriving at this station travel between 69th Street Transit Center in Upper Darby Township, Pennsylvania and Orange Street in Media, Pennsylvania. The major D1 improvement project of 2008-2010 expanded, modernized, and refurbished this facility. Inbound (toward 69th Street Transit Center) trolleys stop for passengers on the north side of Springfield Road at a platform equipped with a large shed with an overhanging roof. A second, smaller shelter was added to the inbound platform. Outbound trolleys stop along a new (2009) platform along the south side of Springfield Road, adjacent to the sizeable station parking lot. This long platform has two open-air metal benches and a bench in a small, roofed shelter to protect waiting passengers during inclement weather. The lighted, landscaped, free parking lot by this platform offers parking for approximately 30 vehicles, and includes spaces for handicapped drivers and a bicycle rack. Several additional free parking spaces for cars line the outbound tracks along North Rolling Road on the north side of Springfield Road across from Windsor Circle.
