= Chester Pike/Sharon Hill station =

Light rail station on SEPTA Route 102

Chester Pike/Sharon Hill
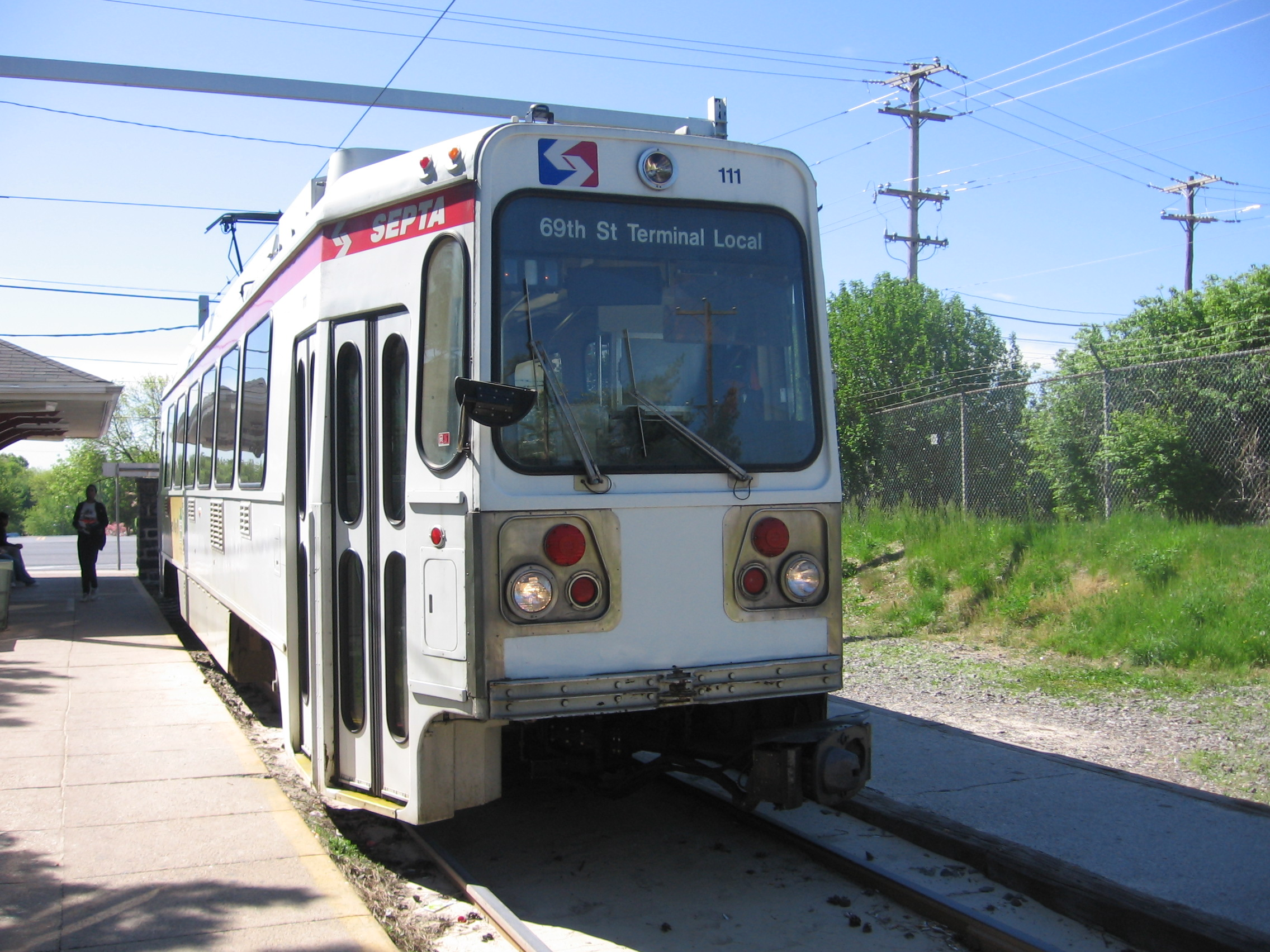
- D2 trolley car at Chester Pike/Sharon Hill station in August 2001

General information
- Location: 1402 Chester Pike (US 13), Sharon Hill, Pennsylvania
- Coordinates: 39.9065°N 75.2781°W
- Owner: SEPTA
- Platforms: 1
- Tracks: 1
- Connections: Wilmington/Newark Line at Sharon Hill SEPTA Suburban Bus: 114

Construction
- Accessible: No

History
- Electrified: Overhead lines

Services
| Preceding station | SEPTA Metro | Following station |
|---|---|---|
| Terminus | D (SEPTA Metro) | MacDade Boulevard toward 69th Street T.C. |
Location

Chester Pike/Sharon Hill station is a station on the D in Sharon Hill, Pennsylvania. The terminus of the D2, the single track ends where it meets Chester Pike (US 13). Trolleys arriving at this station originate from 69th Street Transit Center in Upper Darby Township, Pennsylvania. The station has a shed with a roof where people can go inside when it is raining. It is also about a half-mile walking distance of the Sharon Hill Regional Rail station which serves the Wilmington/Newark Line (formerly R2). However, due to the narrow nature of the neighborhoods and the overall distance, no direct connection exists between the two stations.

Though Sharon Hill is the terminus of the line, CSX's Philadelphia Subdivision freight line bridge crosses over the tracks between here and MacDade Boulevard station, resulting in the large dip upon entering the station from the north. Flooding often occurs in the underpass and as a result, shuttle buses between the two stations are used as substitutes for trolley cars.
