= 69th Street Transit Center =

Rapid transit station in Philadelphia

69th St Transit Center
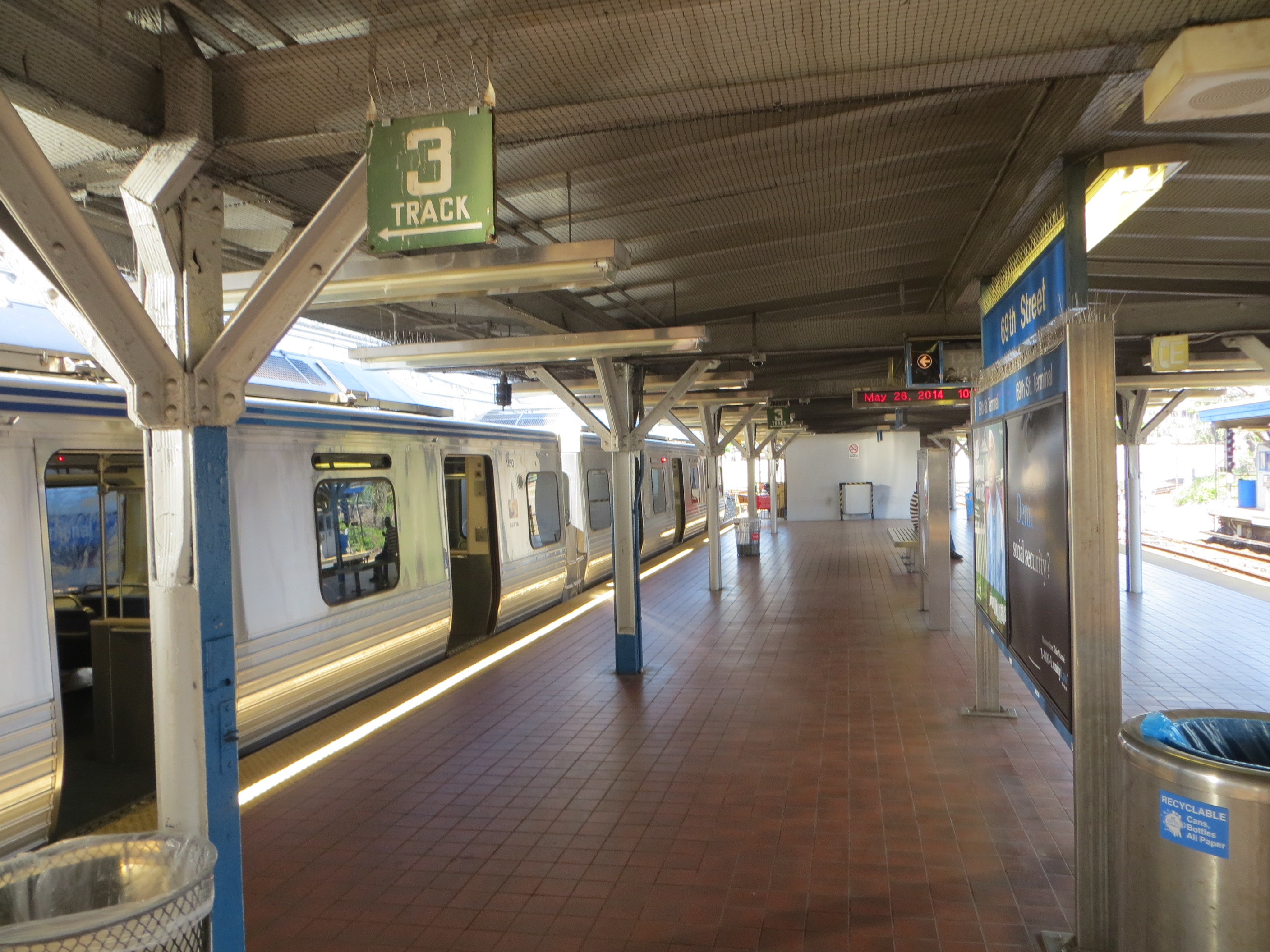
- Market–Frankford (L) e.b. platform, March 2014

General information
- Location: 6901 Market Street; Upper Darby Township, Pennsylvania
- Coordinates: 39°57′47″N 75°15′36″W
- Owner: SEPTA
- Platforms: 1 island & 1 side (L); 1 island & 1 side (D); 2 island & 2 side (M)
- Tracks: 3 (L), 2 (D), 3 (M)
- Connections: SEPTA City Bus: 21, 30, 65, 68; SEPTA Suburban Bus: 103, 104, 105, 107, 108, 109, 110, 111, 112, 113, 120, 123, 126

Construction
- Structure type: At-grade
- Parking: 186 spaces
- Accessible: yes

History
- Opened: March 4, 1907
- Former names: 69th Street Terminal (1907–2011); 69th Street Transportation Center (2011–2025)

Services
Preceding station	SEPTA Metro	Following station
Terminus	L (SEPTA Metro)	Millbourne toward Frankford T.C.
Parkview toward Norristown T.C.	M (SEPTA Metro)	Terminus
Fairfield Avenue toward Orange Street/Media	D (SEPTA Metro)	Terminus
Fairfield Avenue toward Chester Pike/Sharon Hill	D (SEPTA Metro)	Terminus
Former services
Preceding station	Philadelphia Transportation Company	Following station
Terminus	Market Elevated	66th Street toward Frankford
Preceding station	Lehigh Valley Transit Company	Following station
Parkview toward Allentown	Liberty Bell High Speed Line	Terminus
Preceding station	Philadelphia and Western Railroad	Following station
Parkview toward Strafford	Strafford Branch	Terminus
Track layout
Location

69th Street Transit Center, formerly known as 69th Street Transportation Center, is a SEPTA terminal in the Terminal Square area of Upper Darby Township, Pennsylvania. It serves the SEPTA Metro L, M, D, and 14 SEPTA bus routes between the City & Suburban divisions. It is located across Market Street (Route 3) from 69th Street, a major retail corridor.

Serving 35,000 passengers daily during 2019, 69th Street is the second-busiest SEPTA transfer point behind only 15th Street/City Hall station. The terminal also contains SEPTA offices and retail space. SEPTA maintains a dedicated 186 berth parking lot just east of the station.

== History ==
=== 20th century ===
69th Street Transportation Center
Great Hall

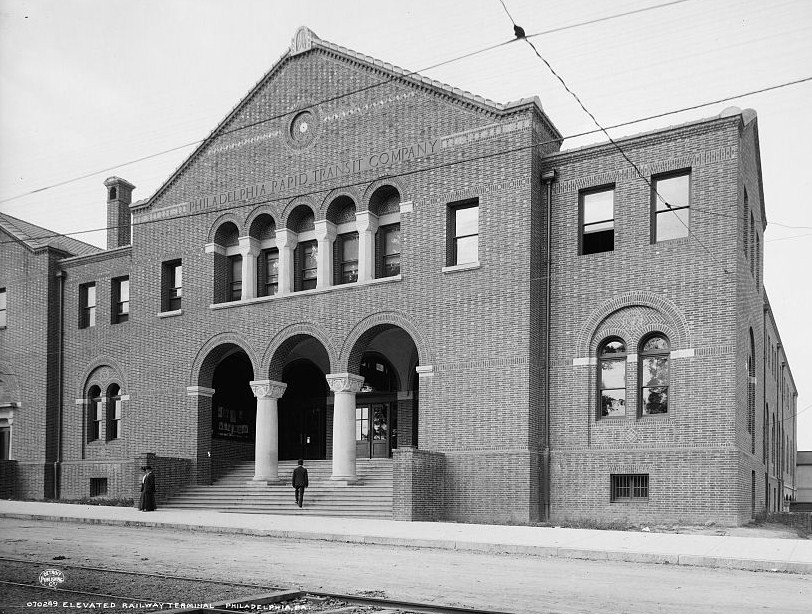
69th Street Transportation Center, shortly after opening in 1907

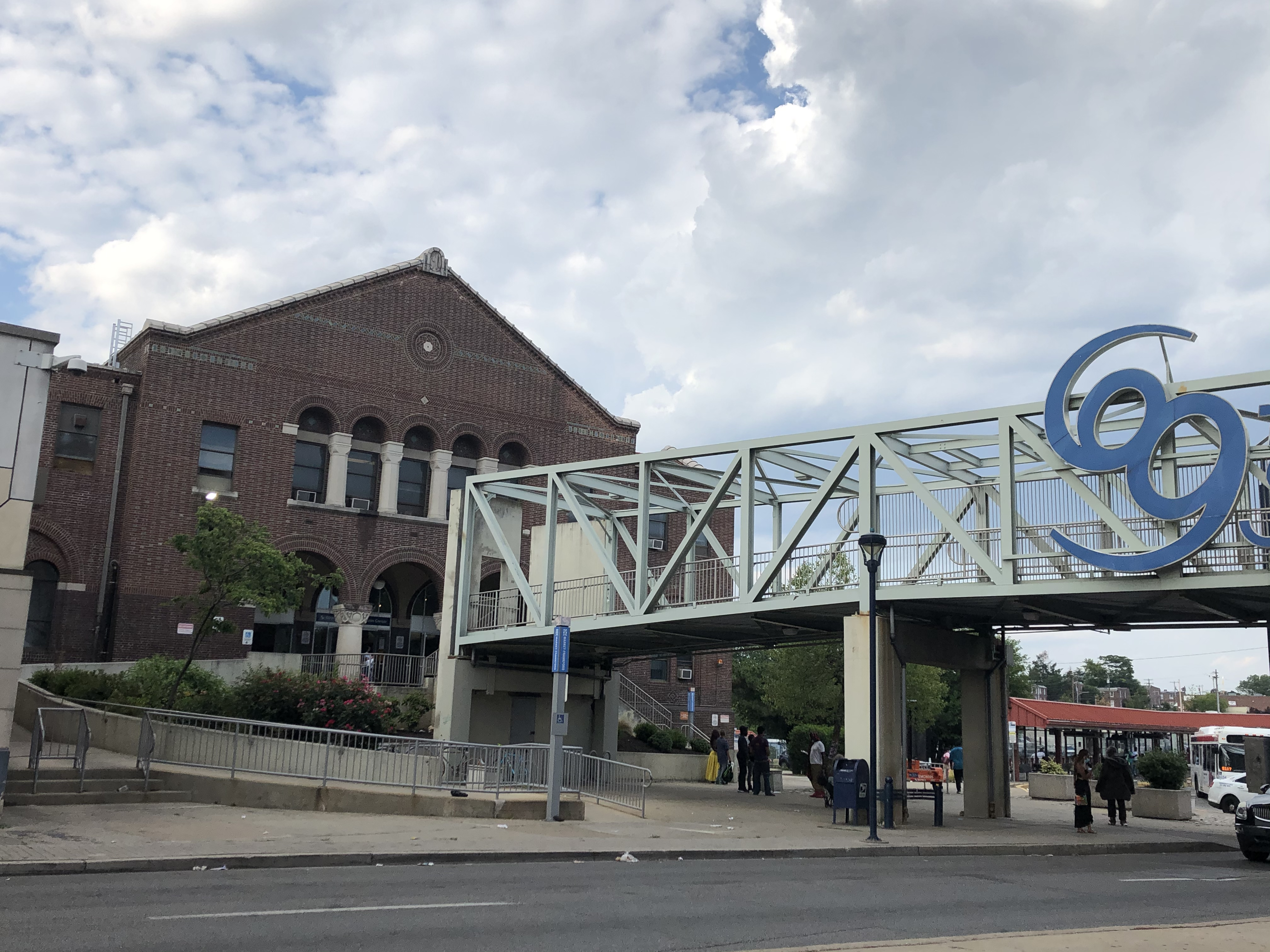
69th Street Transportation Center with an expanded foot bridge covering the right side in 2020

The Philadelphia Rapid Transit Company built 69th Street as the original western terminus for their Market Street Elevated Railway; the line opened for service on March 4, 1907, running between the 69th Street and 15th Street/City Hall stations. The PRT had intended to end the elevated near 63rd Street, but the Philadelphia & West Chester Traction Company successfully petitioned to build their shared terminal in an Upper Darby cow pasture along West Chester Pike. The Traction Company used this open land to build company offices and 5 stub end tracks to support increased service along their trolley lines to West Chester, Ardmore, and Collingdale. On May 22 of that year, the Philadelphia and Western Railroad opened their electric interurban line to a farm on Sugartown Road in Strafford. The P&W built their 69th Street terminal as a 'temporary' wooden structure with minimal furnishings.

The P&W opened a branch to Norristown in 1912, which quickly became the railway's main line. This connected with the Lehigh Valley Transit Company, which began running Liberty Bell Route trolleys all the way from Allentown to 69th Street. The P&WCT began service to Media in 1913 and extended their Collingdale line to Sharon Hill in 1917.

In 1916, John H. McClatchy purchased 50 acres of farmland south of the terminal on which he built homes, offices, and the 69th Street Shopping District. By 1930 the township's population had grown to over 500% of its 1910 level. This explosive growth is considered one of the earliest examples of transit-oriented development.

Between 1922 & 1923 the P&WCT moved West Chester Pike 50 feet south to make room for 3 new trolley terminals to relieve congestion. In 1936 it replaced all 8 stub end tracks with a loop that could effectively handle the same volume of trolley traffic, as well as most of the bus routes that had previously been loading directly on the Pike. This new layout also provided room for several stores and a movie theater. The 'temporary' P&W station finally came down in 1962, with a three track terminal and air-conditioned waiting room opening the next year.

In the 1930s the Philadelphia & West Chester Traction Company merged with a series of other Delaware County transportation companies and in 1936 renamed itself the Philadelphia Suburban Transportation Company, or Red Arrow Lines. Red Arrow acquired the Philadelphia & Western Railroad at the end of 1953. Red Arrow merged into SEPTA in 1970, unifying all services in the station under a single operator for the first time on January 29.

On August 23, 1986 a Route 100 train crashed into the terminal, injuring 44 people and killing 1.

=== 21st century ===
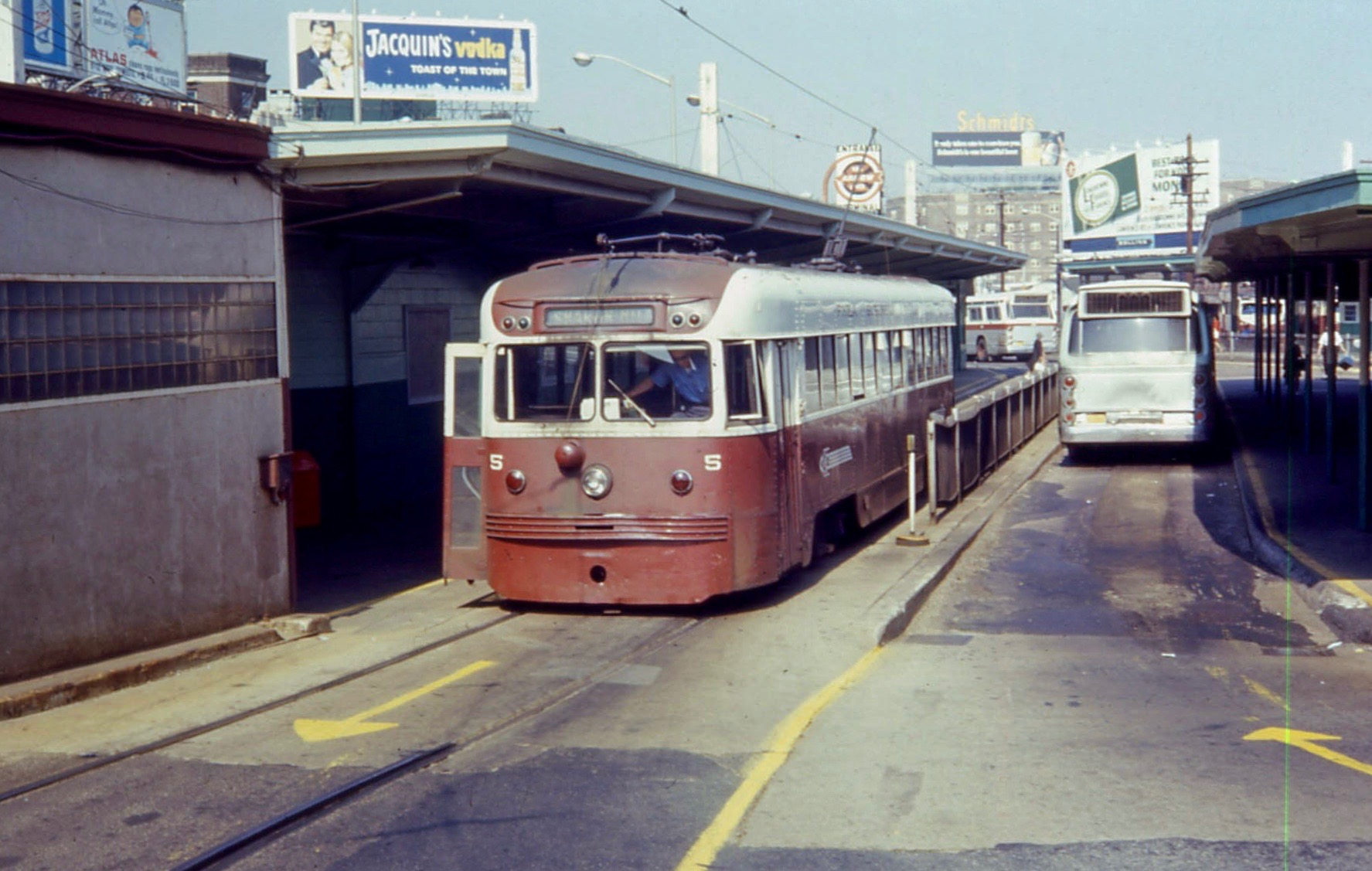
A bus and trolley at the West Terminal in June 1968

On January 29, 2016, SEPTA opened a renovated West Terminal. The $19.6 million project reconstructed the central terminal & platform canopies, replaced the loop's tracks & pavement, added new platforms and ramps to the terminal building, and installed a green roof & eco-friendly LED lighting.

On February 21, 2017, two Market-Frankford trains collided due to an operator driving too fast into the balloon loop, injuring 4 people. On August 22, 2017, an inbound Norristown High Speed train crashed into an unoccupied train at the terminal, injuring 33 people.

On October 18, 2018, SEPTA announced plans for a 318 berth parking garage above the South Terminal bus platform. They estimated construction would cost $37 million, break ground in summer 2020, and last 18 months. A 2019 report suggested removing the bridge across Market Street in favor of a traffic-calmed intersection with crosswalks. In April 2024, SEPTA installed new fare gates at the entrances to the L & M platforms to combat fare evasion.

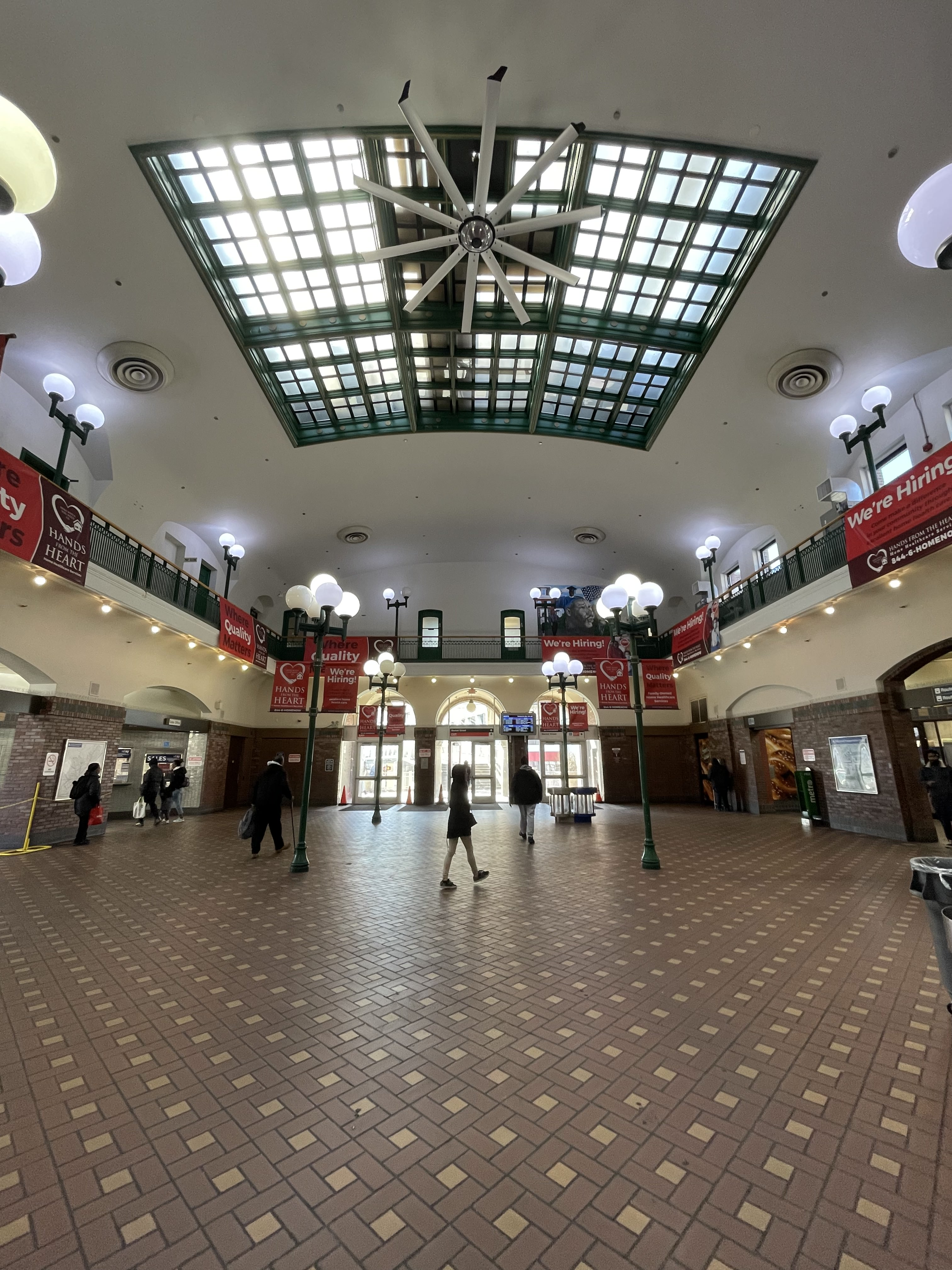
The station's Great Hall, which opened in 1907

== (Market-Frankford Line) platforms ==
The L (formerly Market–Frankford Line) begins at 69th Street, travels east thorough West and Center City Philadelphia along Market Street, then northeast to Frankford Transit Center. 69th Street & nearby Millbourne are the only L stations outside the Philadelphia city limits and the only ground level L stations.

Three below-grade tracks serve the L. Westbound trains terminate on the northern track and all passengers must disembark onto the side platform. Eastbound trains proceed around the balloon loop to the access the two southern tracks which straddle the loading platform. All passengers access the platform via stairs or elevators to the terminal's main level above. Trains may instead continue west to access the storage/maintenance yard they share with the D.

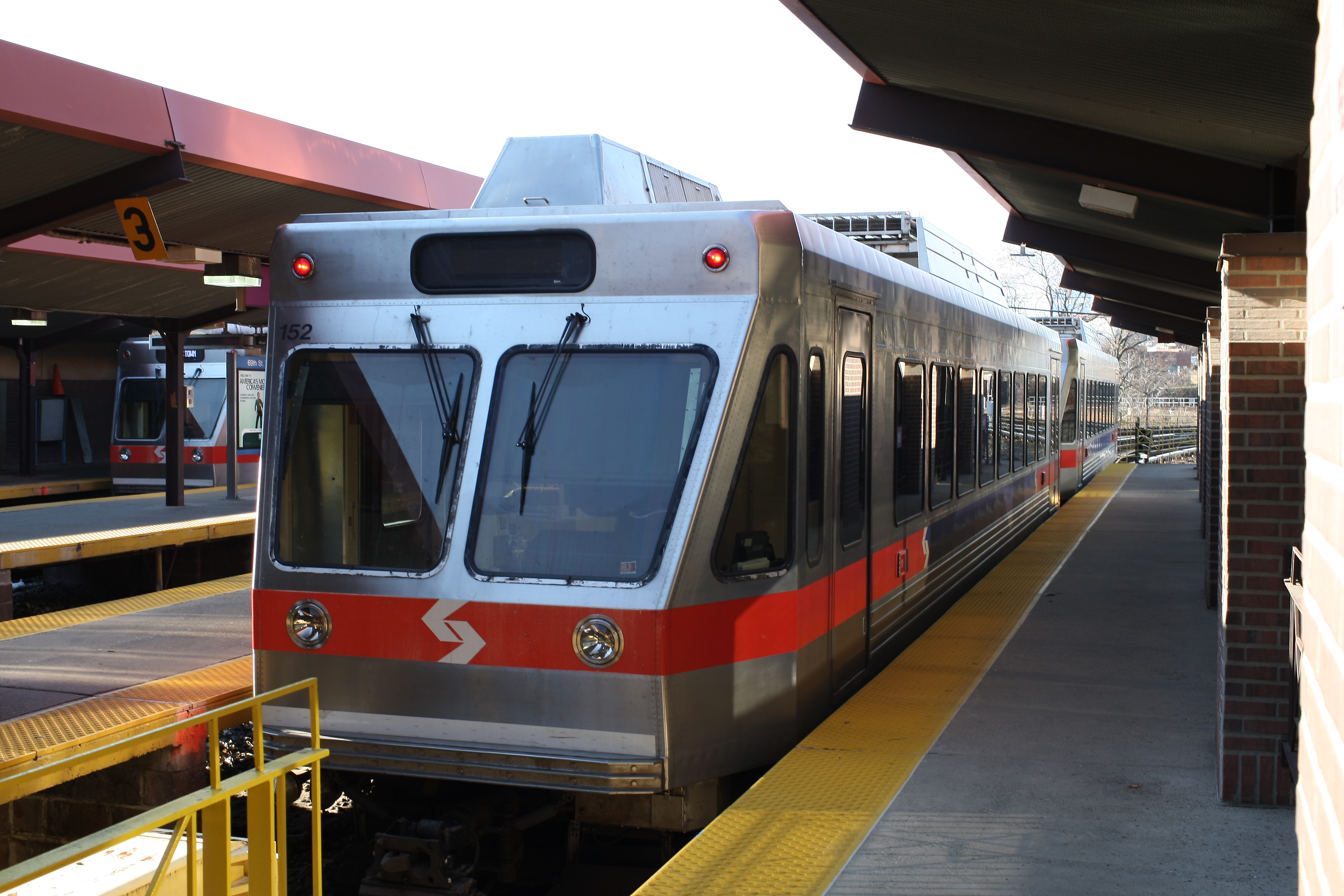
A two-car M train from the northernmost platform. Bumper block visible in the bottom-left.

== (Norristown High Speed Line) Platforms ==
The M (formerly Norristown High Speed Line or Route 100) begins at 69th Street and travels north through the Main Line to Norristown Transit Center in Norristown. All three tracks terminate facing the station and have platforms on both sides. The M terminal area sits between the L tracks and the North Terminal bus bays.

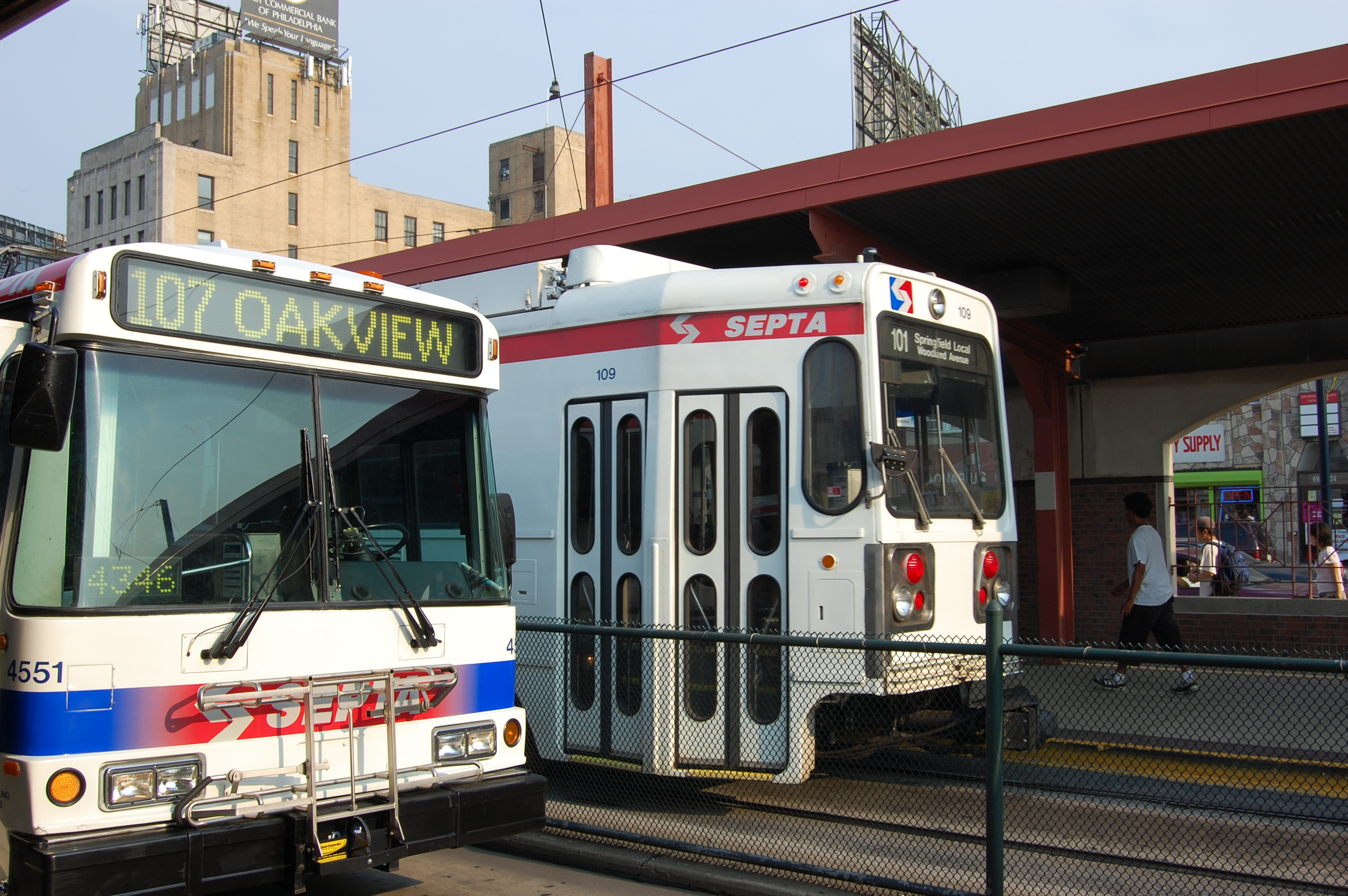
A terminating D1 trolley passing an outbound Route 107 bus

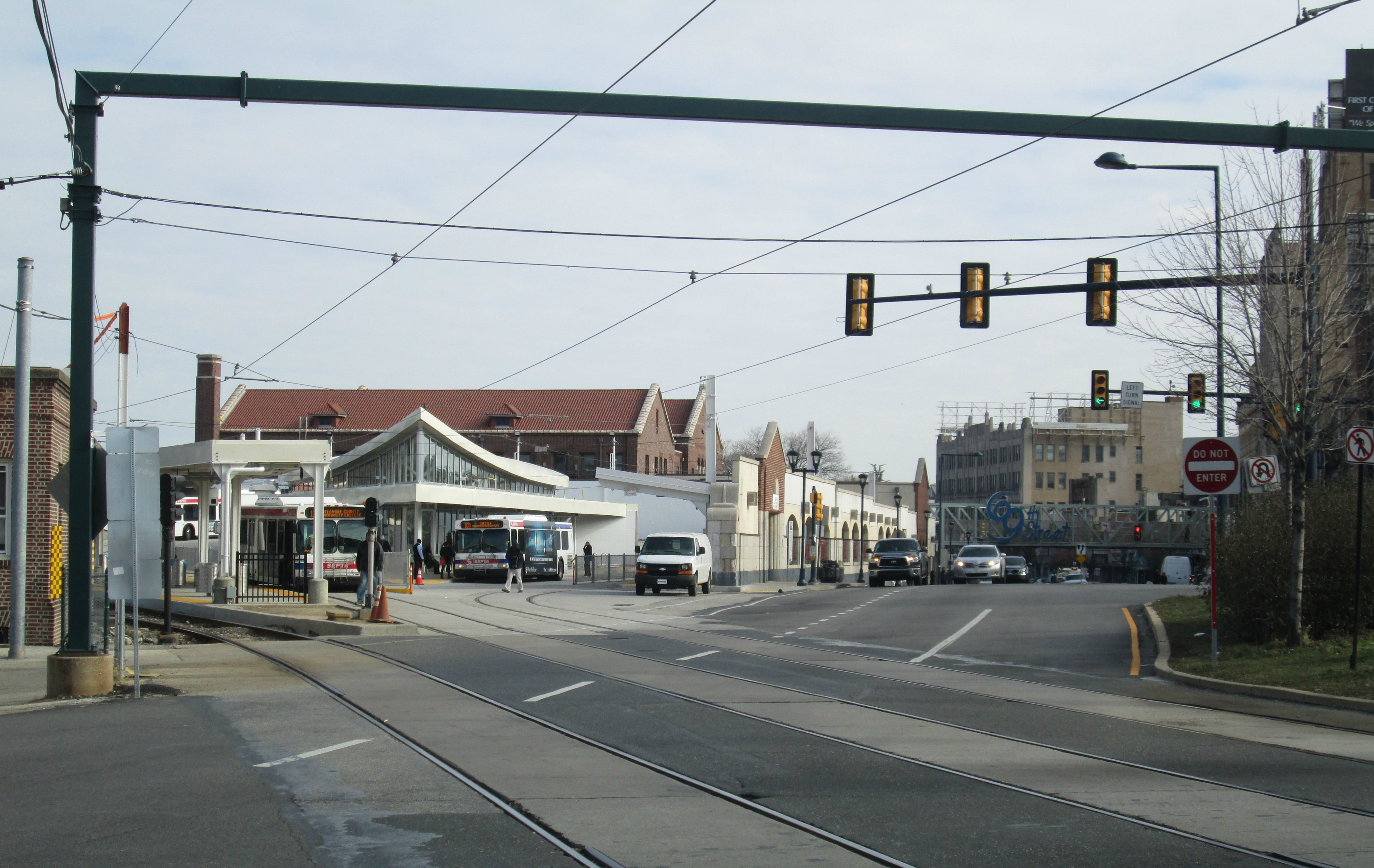
The reconstructed West Terminal seen from across Market Street

== (Media-Sharon Hill Line) and Bus Platforms ==
14 bus routes begin at 69th Street in three distinct areas: West Terminal, North Terminal, and South Terminal.

West Terminal sits directly north of Market Street. It consists of a clockwise inner loop serving the central terminal and a counter-clockwise outer loop serving two separate boarding areas. All three platforms include indoor connections to the main terminal. The D (formerly Media-Sharon Hill Line or Routes 101 & 102) trolleys run on tracks laid in the outer loop. An unpaved track splits off to straddle the northern platform before recombining in the intersection. Two staging tracks branch again near the end of the platform; these lead to a storage/maintenance yard shared with the L. Bus routes 104, 109, 110, 111, 112, 120, and 126 use West Terminal. Most of these routes head West Chester Pike or South along Garrett Road.

Vehicles can only access North Terminal via a private SEPTA road from Victory Avenue. Passengers access it via stairs or elevators down from the station's main floor. It consists of a line of sheltered berths and two loops for buses to turn around. Routes 30, 65, 103, 105, and 123 begin here before mostly running North along Victory Avenue.

Buses enter South Terminal from Market Street in the East, then exit back onto it in the West. It consists of a long canopied platform and a smaller island platform with a bus shelter. A taxi stand sits directly north of the main platform and shares street access with the terminal. Routes 21, 68, 107, 108, and 113 begin here and run in various directions.
