= Pennsylvania Station =

Pennsylvania Station or Penn Station may refer to:

== Current train stations ==
- Baltimore Penn Station
- New York Penn Station
  - Pennsylvania Station (1910–1963), the predecessor to the present New York City station
- Newark Penn Station

== Train stations formerly called Pennsylvania Station ==
- 30th Street Station, Philadelphia, formerly Pennsylvania Station–30th Street
- Exchange Place station (Pennsylvania Railroad), Jersey City
- Harrisburg Transportation Center, formerly Pennsylvania Station, Harrisburg
- Union Station (Pittsburgh), or Pennsylvania Station
- Wilmington station (Delaware), formerly Pennsylvania Station 1907–2011
- Cleveland Union Depot, later known as Pennsylvania Station
  - Euclid Avenue Station, known as Pennsylvania Station following the closure of Cleveland Union Depot
- Pennsylvania Station (Cincinnati)

== Subway stations ==
- 34th Street–Penn Station (IND Eighth Avenue Line), a New York City Subway station (A, C, and E trains)
- 34th Street–Penn Station (IRT Broadway–Seventh Avenue Line), a New York City Subway station (1, 2, and 3 trains)

== Other uses ==
- Penn Station (restaurant chain), a restaurant chain headquartered in Milford, Ohio, United States

== See also ==
- Pennsylvania Railroad, namesake of these stations
- Penn Center Station, former name of Suburban station, Philadelphia
- Penn Medicine Station, in Philadelphia
- Penn Street station, in Clifton Heights, Pennsylvania
