= List of historical passenger rail services in Cleveland =

The table below shows all passenger railroad lines that have served downtown Cleveland, Ohio and what terminal they used.

Railroads	Successor railroad	Union Terminal	Lakefront	Union Depot	Erie Depot	CT&V Depot	NKP Depot	W&LE Depot	Other stations
Conrail	–	1976–1977							
Amtrak	–	1971	1975–present		1972 (5 days)				
Penn Central	Amtrak (10 day gap)	1968–1971							
Norfolk and Western Railway	–	1964–1965							
Erie Lackawanna Railway	Conrail	1960–1976							
Baltimore and Ohio Railroad	–	1934–1962				1909–1934			1898–1909
New York Central Railroad	PC	1930–1968		1914–1930	?				East 105th 1914–1930
Pennsylvania Railroad	–			1918–1953					Euclid Avenue; 1918–1965
Wheeling and Lake Erie Railway	–				1929–1935			1909–1929	1935–1938; 1899–1909
Cleveland Terminal and Valley Railroad	B&O					1898–1901			1895–1898
Cleveland, Cincinnati, Chicago and St. Louis Railway	NYC			1889–1930	?				
Cleveland, Akron and Columbus Railway	PCo			1885–1911					Euclid Avenue; 1885–1911
Cleveland, Canton & Southern Railroad	W&LE								1885–1899
Cleveland, Lorain and Wheeling Railroad	B&O			1883–1895		1898–1901			1895–1898
New York, Chicago and St. Louis Railroad	N&W	1930–1965					1883–1928		West 25th ?–? 1882–1883
Connotton Valley Railway	C&C								1880–1885
New York, Pennsylvania and Ohio Railroad	Erie				1881–1883				1880–1883
Valley Railway	CT&V								1880–1895
Cleveland, Painesville & Ashtabula Railroad (1879–1882)	NYC&St.L								1879–1882
Cleveland, Tuscarawas Valley and Wheeling Railway	CL&W			1875–1883					
Pennsylvania Company	PRR			1871–1918					Euclid Avenue; 1871–1918
Lake Shore and Michigan Southern Railway	NYC			1869–1914	?				East 105th 1910–1914
Cleveland, Mount Vernon and Delaware Railway	CA&C			1869–1885					Euclid Avenue; 1869–1885
Cleveland, Columbus, Cincinnati and Indianapolis Railway	CCC&St.L			1868–1889	?				
Bellefontaine Railway	CCC&I			1864–1868					
Erie Railroad	EL; A&GW	1948–1960			1883–1948				1868–1871
Atlantic and Great Western Railroad	Nypano								1871–1880; 1863–1868
Cleveland and Mahoning Valley Railroad	A&GW Ry								1856–1863
Bellefontaine and Indiana Railroad	Bellefontaine			1854–1864					
Cleveland, Zanesville and Cincinnati Railroad	CMV&D			1854–1869					
Cleveland and Toledo Railroad	CP&A			1853–1869					
Cleveland and Pittsburgh Railroad	PCo			1853–1871					Euclid Avenue; 1856–1871; C&P Depot; 1851–1853
Cleveland, Painesville and Ashtabula Railroad (1848–1869)	LS&MS			1853–1869					1851–1853
Toledo, Norwalk and Cleveland Railroad	C&T			1853					1852–1853
Cleveland, Columbus and Cincinnati Railroad	CCC&I			1853–1868	?				1851–1853
