= Youngstown station (Pennsylvania Railroad) =

Railroad station in Youngstown, Ohio

Youngstown
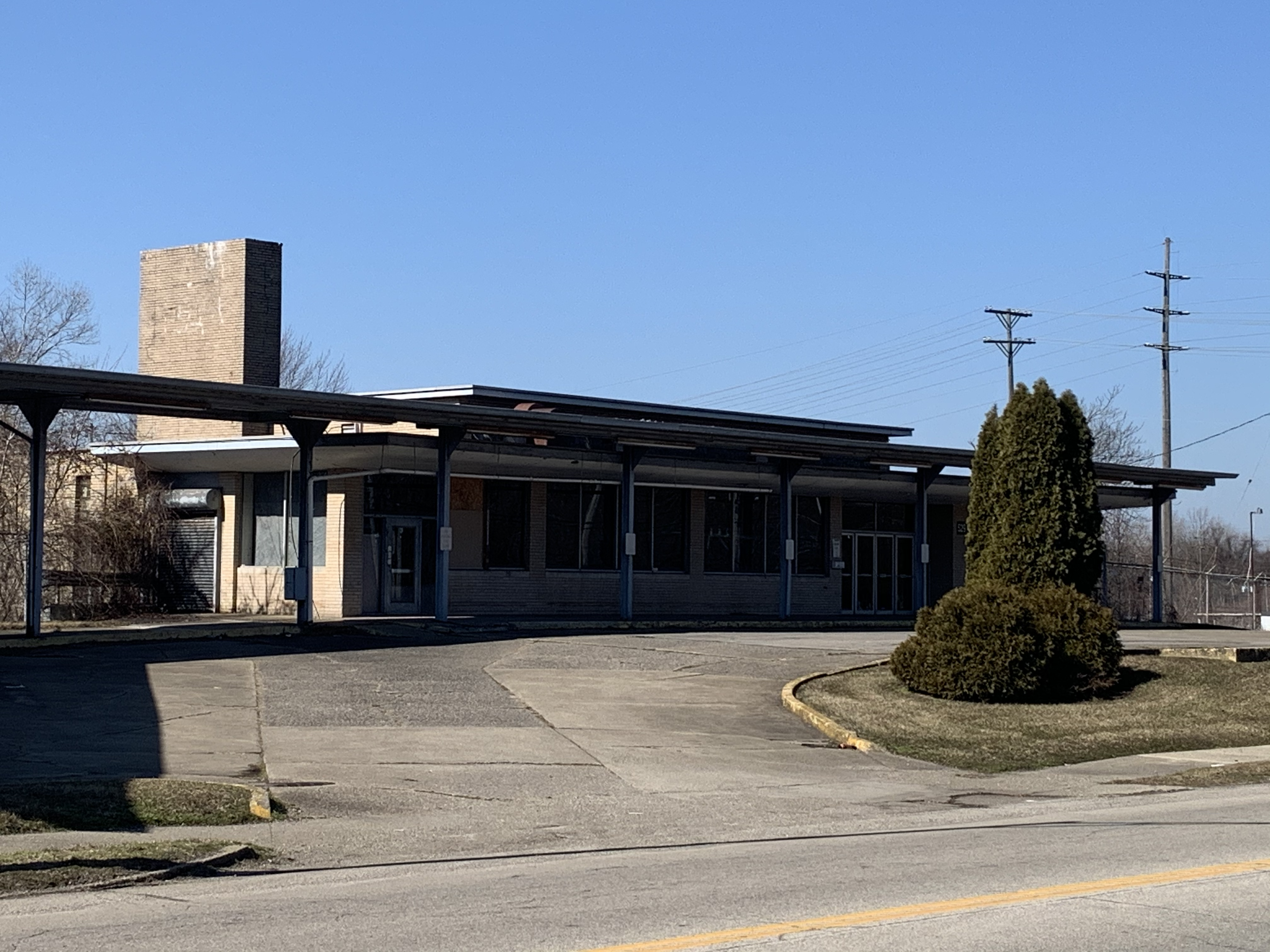

General information
- Location: 529 West Federal Street (Martin Luther King Jr. Boulevard)
- Coordinates: 41.10441°N 80.65824°W
- Owner: Phantom Fireworks
- Line: Norfolk Southern Lordstown Secondary

History
- Opened: March 15, 1949
- Closed: January 29, 1965

Former services
Preceding station	Pennsylvania Railroad	Following station
Brier Hill toward Cleveland	Cleveland – Pittsburgh via Youngstown	Struthers toward Pittsburgh
Brier Hill toward Ashtabula	Ashtabula – Pittsburgh	Struthers toward Pittsburgh
Location

Youngstown is a former Pennsylvania Railroad station in Youngstown, Ohio. This station was preceded by another depot, which was condemned and demolished in 1949. Construction of this station began in February 1948, and the completed building was dedicated on March 15, 1949. The building was designed by Walker & Weeks, architects of Cleveland, Ohio and built by the Heller-Murray Company of Youngstown, Ohio at a cost of $350,000, or approximately $4.4 million in 2022 US dollars. This station closed in 1965, with the termination of remaining commuter service between Youngstown and Euclid Avenue station in Cleveland. Ownership of the Lordstown Secondary as well as the station passed from Penn Central to the Baltimore and Ohio Railroad, Conrail, and is currently owned by Norfolk Southern. The station itself was acquired by Phantom Fireworks and previously used as a firework showroom.

== Gallery ==
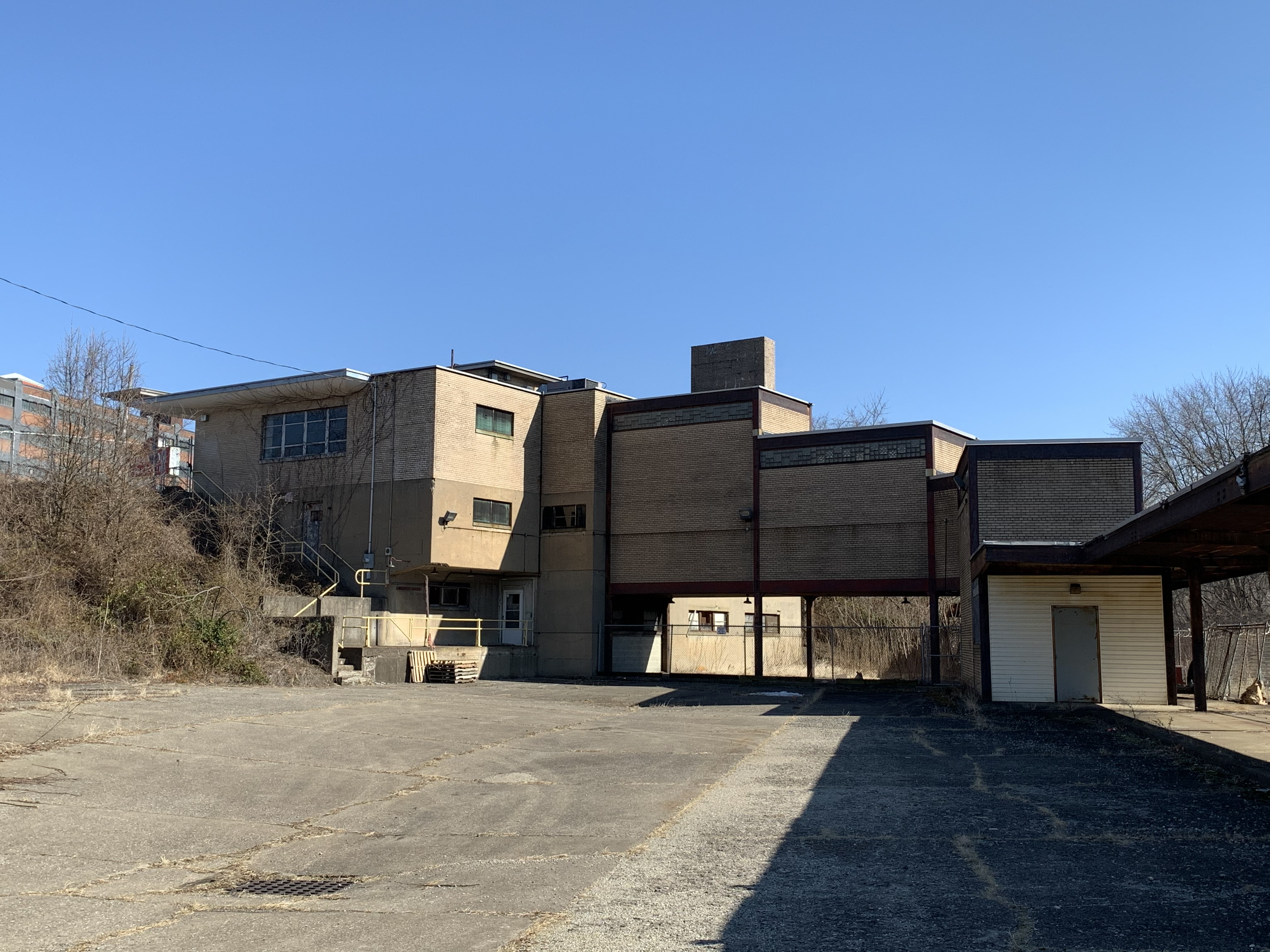

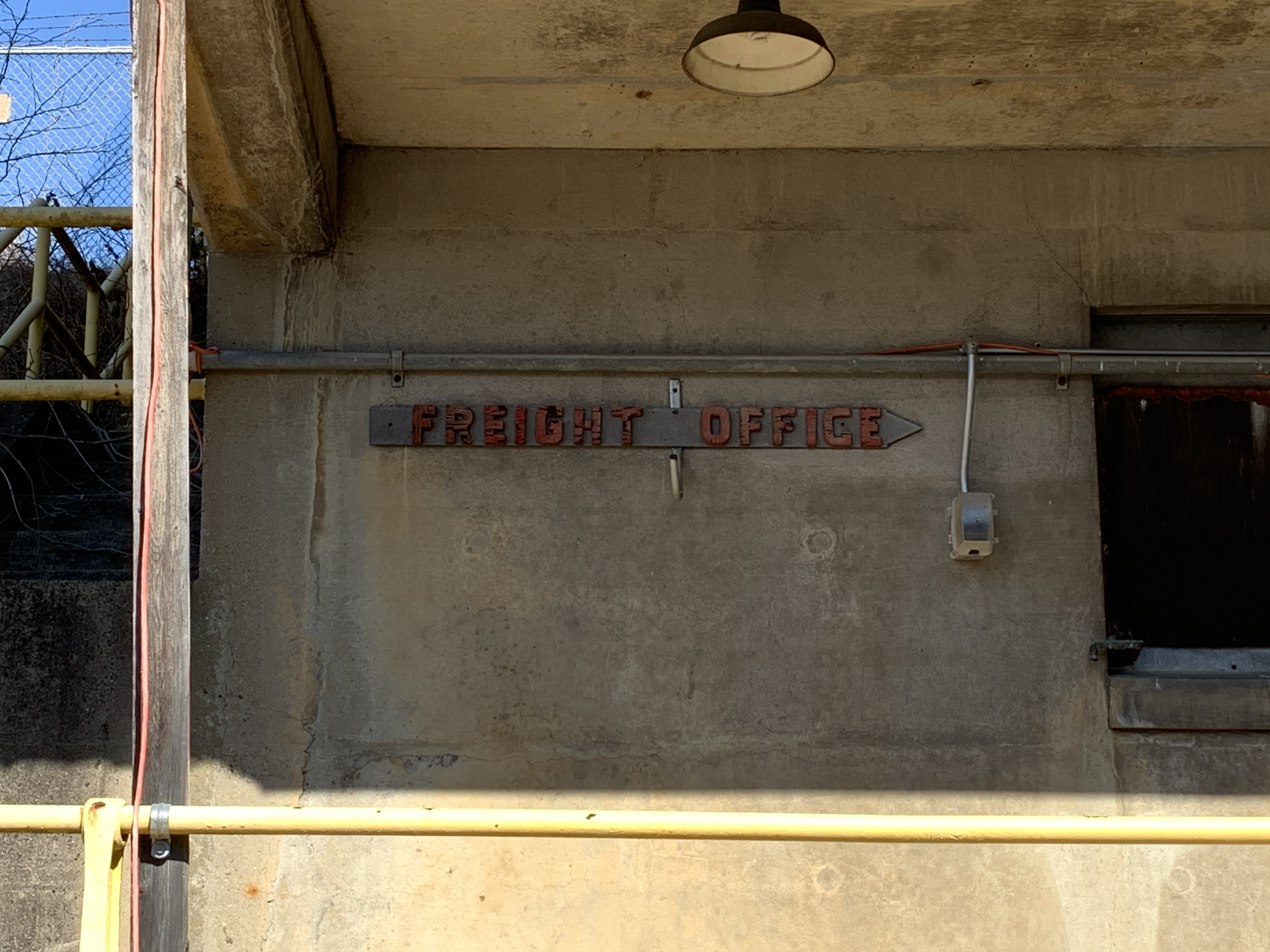

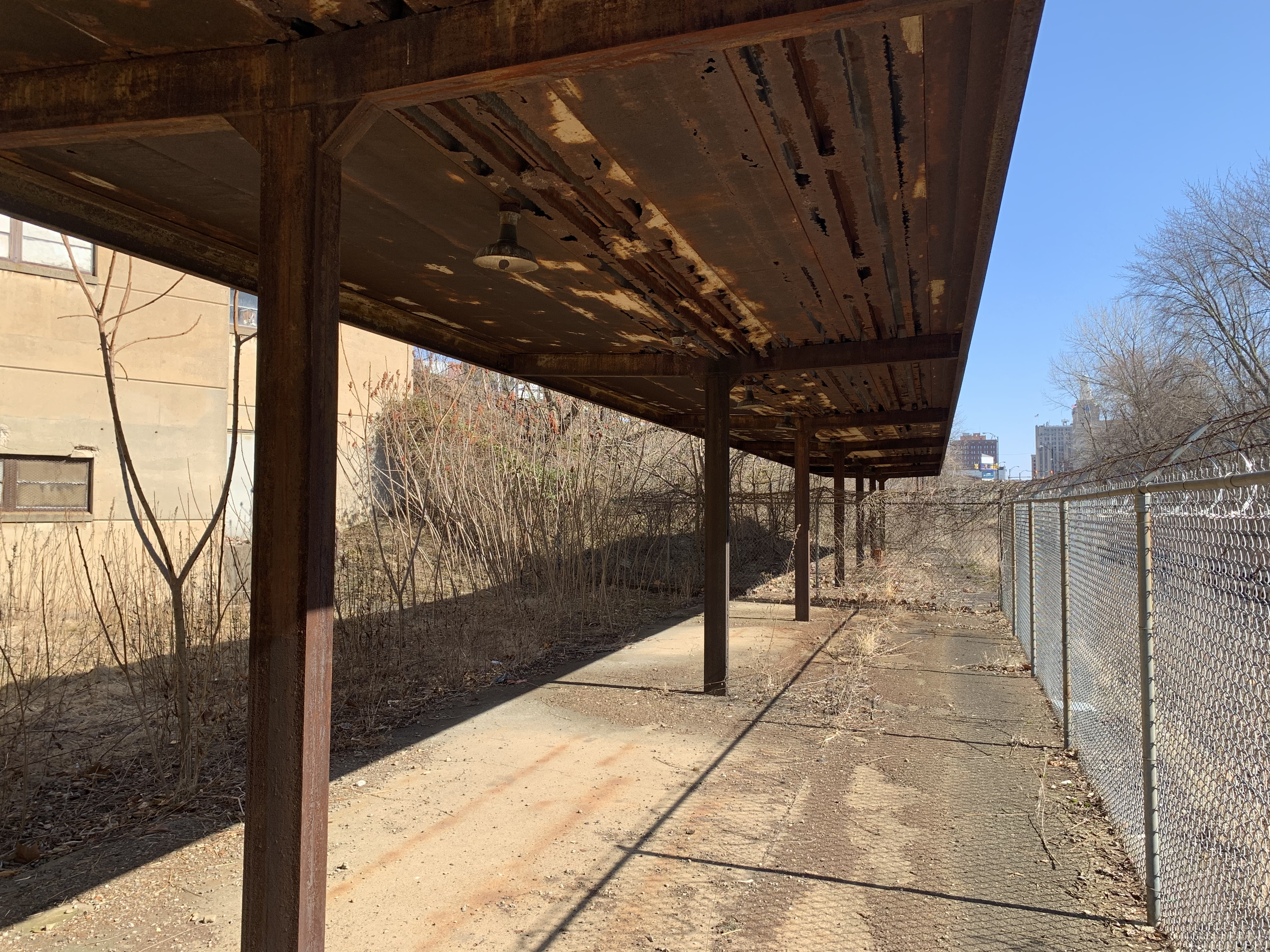
