= Euclid Avenue station (Pennsylvania Railroad) =

Former railroad station in Cleveland, Ohio, U.S.

Euclid Avenue
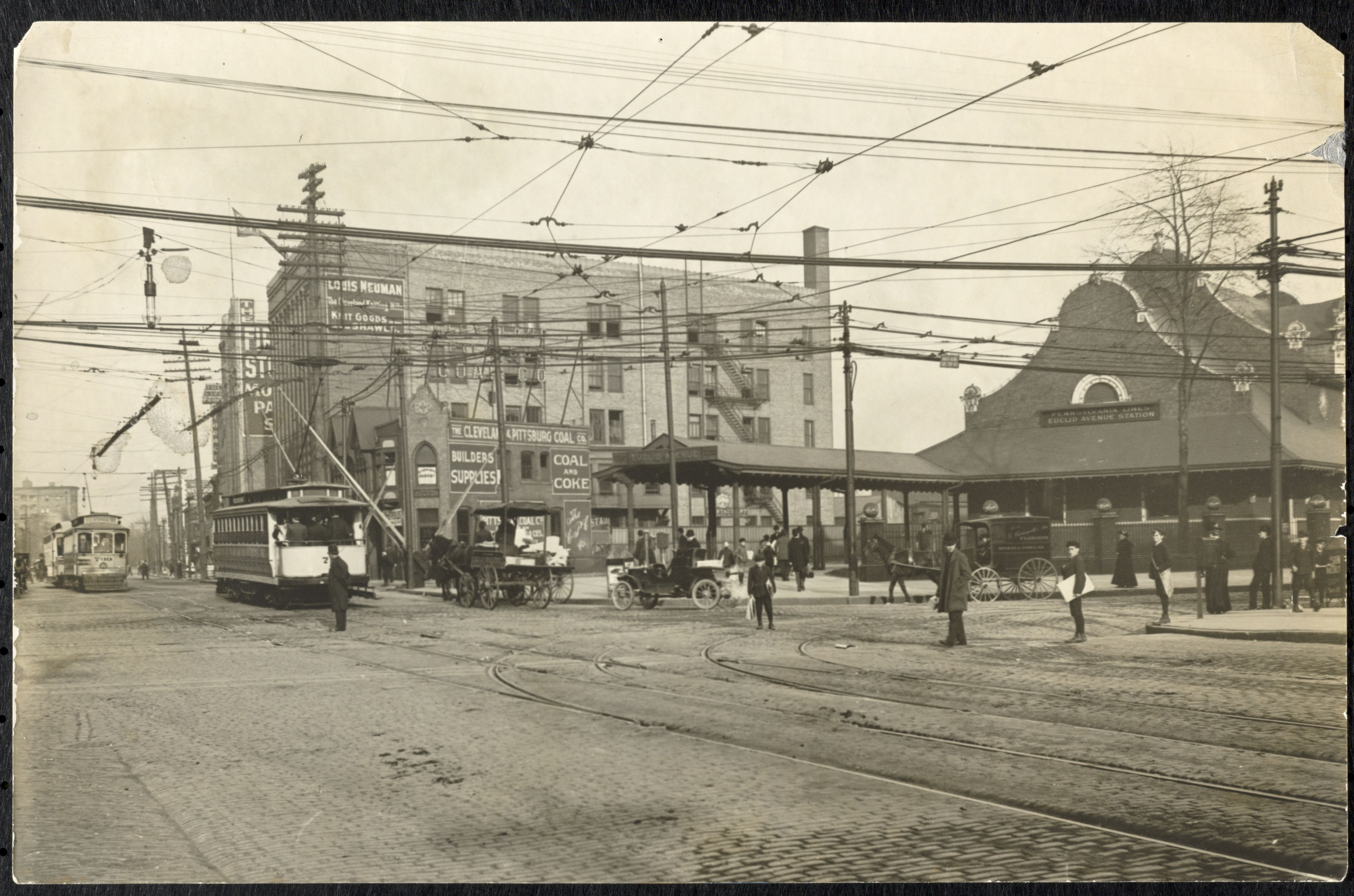
- Euclid Avenue station in 1912

General information
- Location: 2001 East 55th Street; Cleveland, Ohio
- Coordinates: 41.5039°N 81.6510°W
- Owner: Cleveland and Pittsburgh Rail Road (1856–1871); Pennsylvania Railroad (1871–1965)
- Operator: Service to Pittsburgh: Cleveland and Pittsburgh Rail Road (1856–1871 (Note: Publicly referred to as the Cleveland and Pittsburgh Division after 1890, division name adopted internally in 1881. Name changed to Cleveland Division in 1928.)); Pennsylvania Company (1871–1918); Pennsylvania Railroad (1918–1965); Service to Columbus: Cleveland, Mount Vernon and Delaware Railroad (1884–1885 (Note: Previous northern terminus was at Hudson, with some through-service to Cleveland via the Cleveland & Pittsburgh.)); Cleveland, Akron and Columbus Railway (1885–1911 (Note: Independent of PRR control upon inception and until 1899)); Cleveland, Akron and Cincinnati Railway (1911–1912); Pennsylvania Company (1912–1918); Pennsylvania Railroad (1918–1950)
- Line: Norfolk Southern Cleveland Line
- Distance: 3.2 miles from Union Depot
- Platforms: 2
- Tracks: 4

History
- Opened: December 17, 1856
- Closed: January 29, 1965
- Rebuilt: 1866?, 1873, 1902, 1914
- Former names: Euclid Street (until 1870); Euclid Avenue (1870–1953)

Key dates
- Demolished: 1973

Former services
Preceding station	Pennsylvania Railroad	Following station
Cleveland closed 1953 Terminus	Cleveland – Pittsburgh via Youngstown	Woodland Avenue toward Pittsburgh
Cleveland closed 1953 Terminus	Cleveland – Pittsburgh via Alliance	Woodland Avenue toward Pittsburgh
Cleveland closed 1953 Terminus	Cincinnati – Cleveland	Woodland Avenue ended 1950 (Note: Service truncated to Akron, retained as a branch line via Hudson until 1958) toward Cincinnati
Former services (1900)
Preceding station	Pennsylvania Lines	Following station
Cleveland Shops closed 1900 toward Cleveland	Cleveland & Pittsburgh Division	Woodland Avenue toward Pittsburgh
Cleveland Terminus	Cleveland, Akron and Columbus Railroad	Woodland Avenue toward Columbus
Location

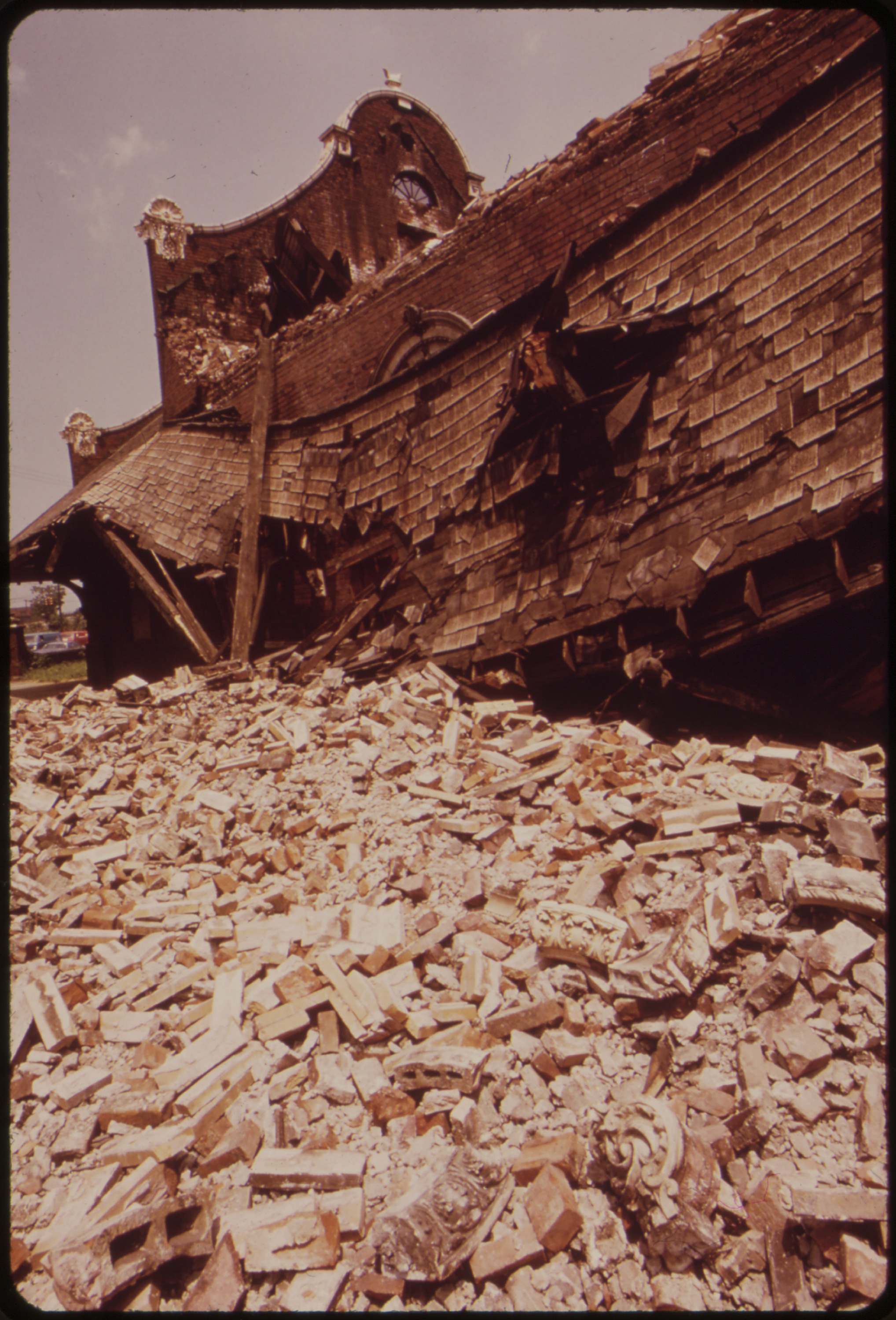
Collapsed headhouse in June 1973

Euclid Avenue, known after 1953 as Cleveland station and Pennsylvania Station, was a former railroad station at the corner of Euclid Avenue and East 55th Street in Cleveland. It was at the border of the Goodrich–Kirtland Park neighborhood to the north and the Central neighborhood to the south. Euclid Avenue station served as the terminus of the Pennsylvania Railroad line to Cleveland in its final years because of the closure and demolition of Cleveland Union Depot. The station was originally at ground level, but the tracks were later elevated over Euclid Avenue.

== History ==
A station at the intersection of Euclid Street (Euclid Avenue from 1870) and Willson Avenue (East 55th Street from 1906) first opened in 1856, when Jared V. Willson and his wife executed a quitclaim deed for $1, partitioning their plot of land on the SE corner of the intersection for a small wooden shelter to be built by the Cleveland and Pittsburgh Rail Road. Additional funds were provided by residents of Euclid Street, contributing $500 towards the construction of said station building. The railroad and station were leased for 99 years by the Pennsylvania Company in 1871.

This train station was a stop on both President Lincoln and President Garfield's funeral trains (April 28, 1865 and September 24, 1881, respectively). The caskets were unloaded and paraded to Public Square. Lincoln was brought from Buffalo to Cleveland Union Depot and proceeded to Euclid. Garfield was brought up from Pittsburgh on the PRR line to Cleveland. Additionally this station served as a stop on Lincoln's inauguration tour on February 15, 1861. A new station building, described by the Plain Dealer as an "elegant little passenger station" was built at this location in August 1873. The rail line in this area was double-tracked in 1883.

The final stationhouse opened for service on June 8, 1902, with the previous structure being demolished shortly afterwards to make room for parking on the west side of the station. The tracks over Euclid Avenue were elevated in the early 1910s, prompting a repurposing of this station. On June 13, 1913, the station was temporarily closed "and then moved about twenty-five feet west and thirty feet south", allowing for the expansion of the station underneath the tracks, the vault of which is still extant today. The expanded station opened on March 3, 1914, implementing the 1902 at-grade stationhouse into the design. Permanent platforms and platform shelters were added once the elevated structure could settle.

This station was made the northern terminal of passenger service after Union Depot closed on September 26, 1953. The Clevelander began making commuter stops on October 23, 1959, and remaining passenger service to Pittsburgh was truncated to Youngstown after April 25, 1964.

Final passenger service between Cleveland and Youngstown station ended on January 29, 1965. The station itself was demolished in June 1973 after the roof collapsed when a freight train passed by.

The 1914 vault and platform staircase remain partially intact as of 2015.

=== Passenger trains ===
==== 1930 ====
Noted passenger trains in 1930 included:

- Pittsburgh Express - Cleveland to Harrisburg eastbound
- Red Arrow - Cleveland to New York eastbound
- The Manhattan - Cleveland to New York eastbound
- Clevelander - New York to Cleveland westbound
- Buckeye Limited - Cleveland to New York eastbound

==== 1954 ====
Noted passenger trains in 1954 included:

- Clevelander - Cleveland–New York City (truncated to Cleveland–Pittsburgh in 1961, discontinued in 1964)
- Morning Steeler & Afternoon Steeler - Cleveland–Pittsburgh (discontinued 1957 and 1958 respectively)

== Gallery ==
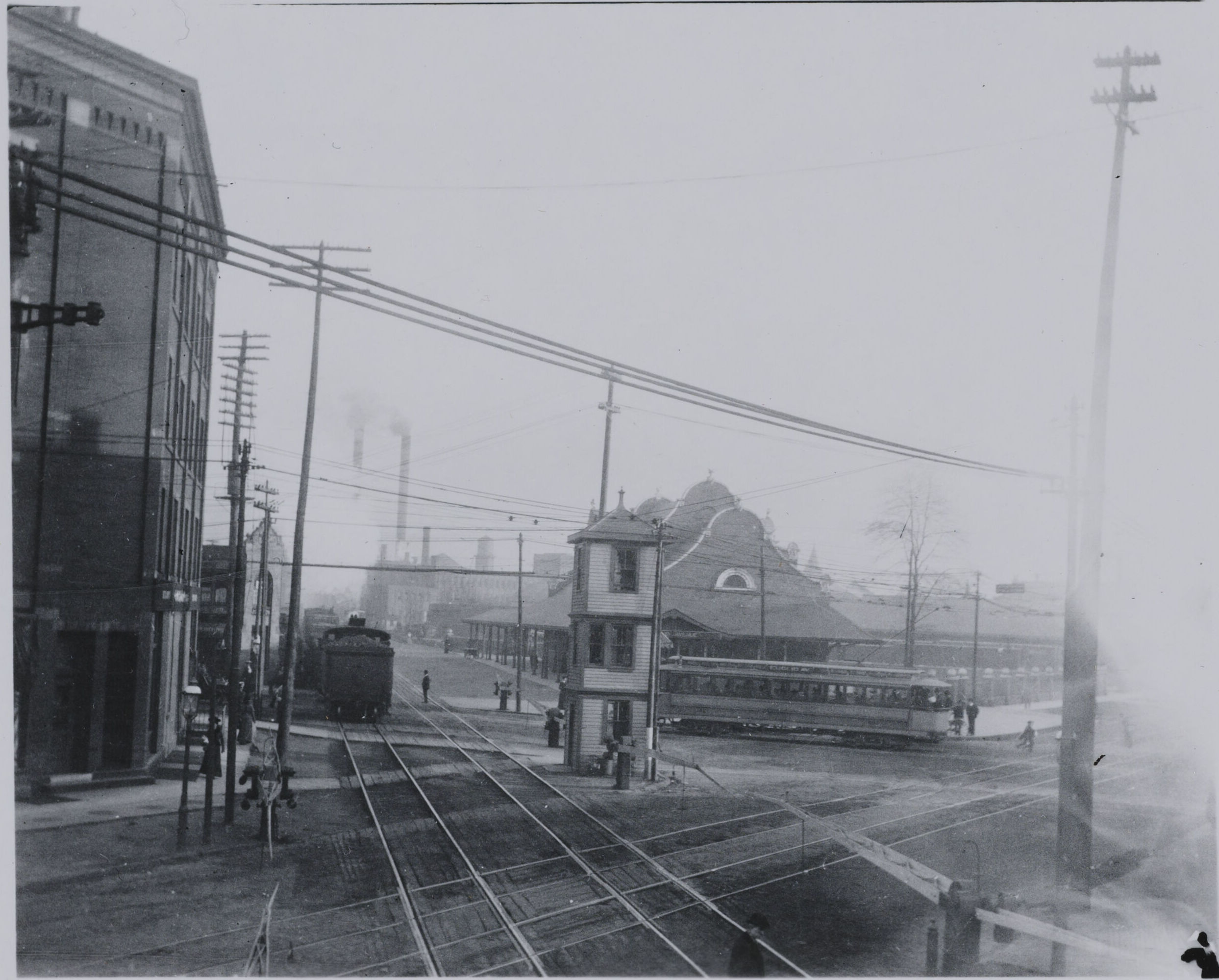
Pennsylvania Company tracks looking southeast, c. 1910s

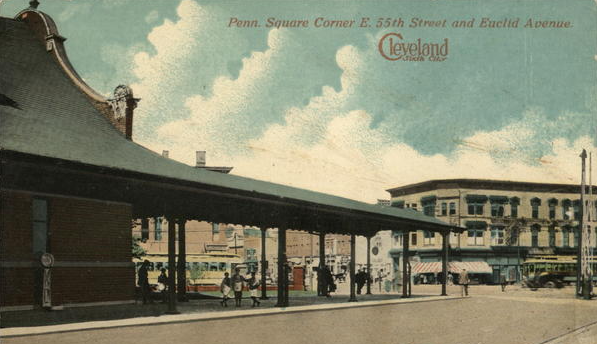
Postcard of Penn Square district, with the Euclid Ave. station, c. 1910s

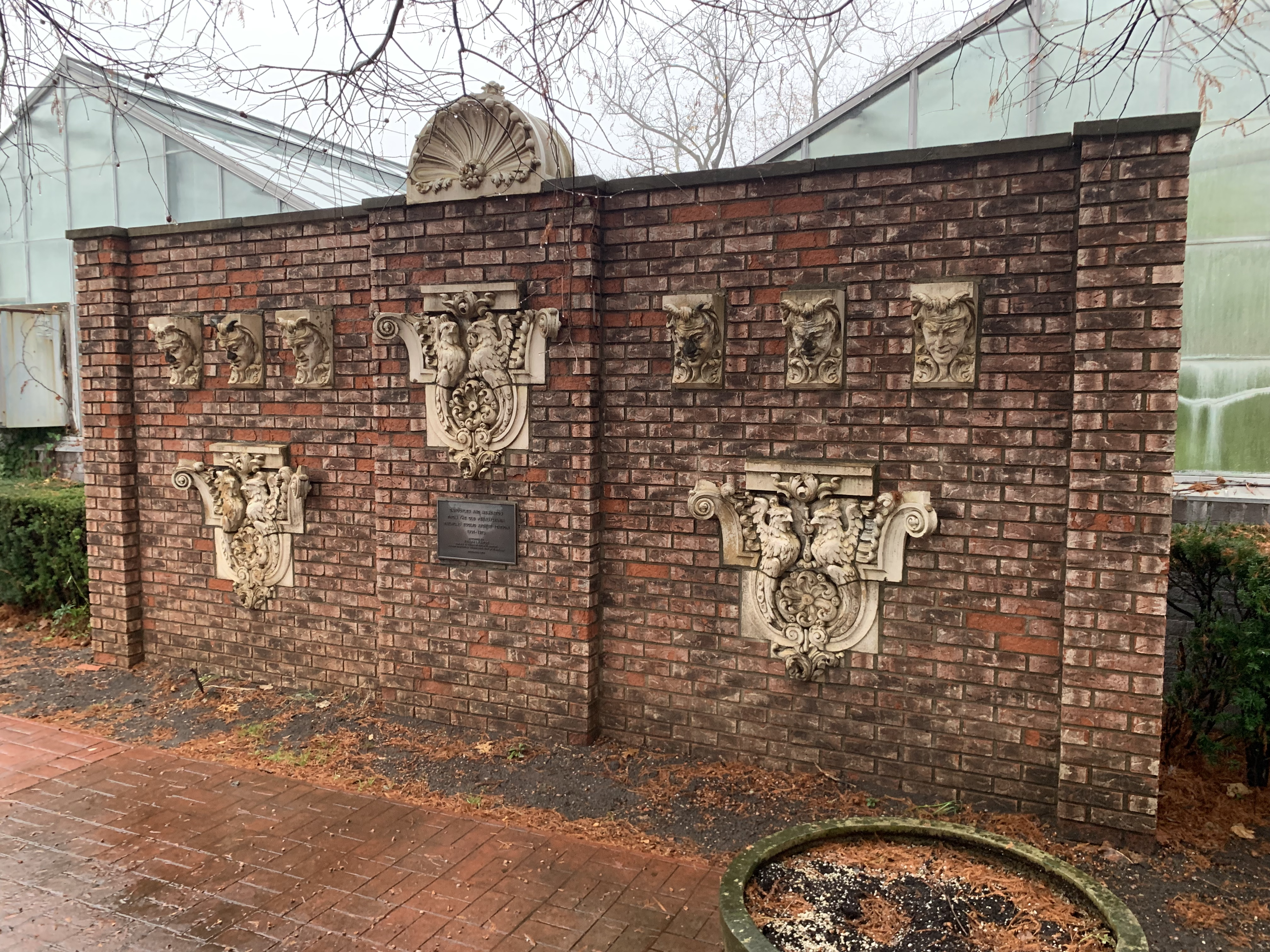
Gargoyles and Mementos of Euclid Avenue station, on display at the Rockefeller Park Greenhouse since 1976

== Footnotes ==
- Coverdale & Colpitts (1946). The Pennsylvania Railroad Company: The Corporate, Financial and Construction History of Lines Owned, Operated and Controlled To December 31, 1945. Volume III: Lines West of Pittsburgh. Philadelphia: Allen, Lane & Scott. OCLC 13172415.

== See also ==
- List of historical passenger rail services in Cleveland
