= Philadelphia and Delaware County Railroad =

Philadelphia and Delaware County Railroad may refer to:

- Philadelphia and Delaware County Railroad (1831–1836), Philadelphia to Wilmington
- Philadelphia and Delaware County Railroad (1890–1913) near Lansdowne
