= Cleveland, Painesville and Ashtabula Railroad =

Cleveland, Painesville and Ashtabula Railroad may refer to:

- Cleveland, Painesville and Ashtabula Railroad (1848–1869), predecessor of the Lake Shore and Michigan Southern Railway (New York Central system)
- Cleveland, Painesville and Ashtabula Railroad (1879–1882), predecessor of the New York, Chicago and St. Louis Railroad (Nickel Plate)
