= Euclid Avenue station =

Euclid Avenue station may refer to:

- Euclid Avenue station (San Diego Trolley), a light rail station in San Diego
- Euclid Avenue station (IND Fulton Street Line), a subway station in Brooklyn, New York City
- Euclid Avenue station (Pennsylvania Railroad), a former railroad station in Cleveland
