= Pennsylvania Railroad Passenger Station =

Pennsylvania Railroad Passenger Station may refer to:

- Pennsylvania Railroad Passenger Station (California, Pennsylvania) or California Area Public Library
- Pennsylvania Railroad Passenger Station (Warren County, Pennsylvania)

== See also ==
- Pennsylvania Station (disambiguation)
