= Clifton–Aldan station =

Railway station in Clifton Heights, Pennsylvania

Clifton–Aldan
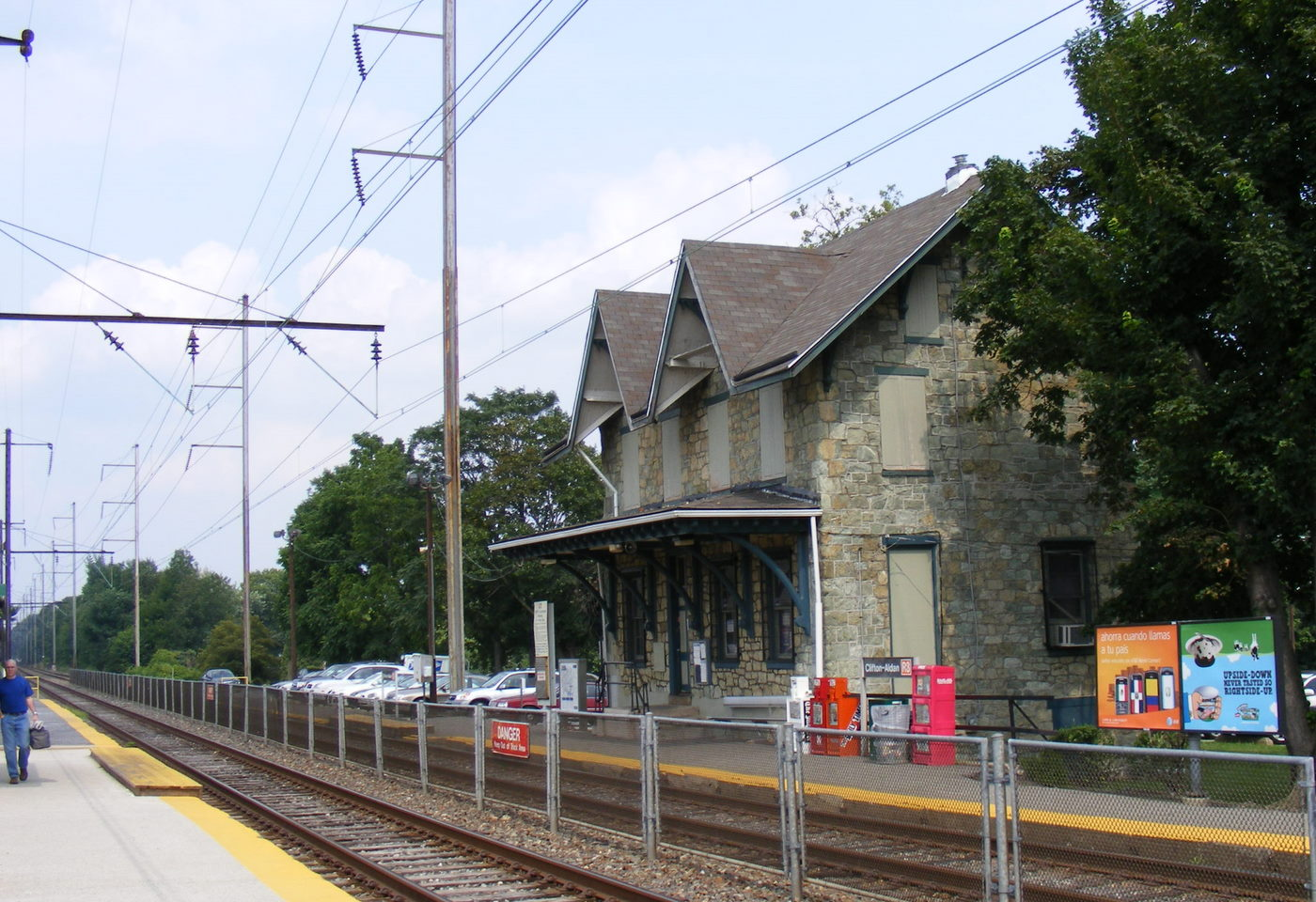

General information
- Location: 1 Springfield Road; Clifton Heights, Pennsylvania
- Coordinates: 39.92634°N 75.29075°W
- Owner: SEPTA
- Platforms: 2 side platform
- Tracks: 2

Construction
- Parking: 110 free/32 with permits
- Accessible: No

Other information
- Fare zone: 2

History
- Opened: 1880; 1906 (D2)
- Electrified: December 2, 1928 (Media/Wawa)
- Former names: Aldan

Passengers
- 2017: 269 boardings 276 alightings (weekday average) (Regional Rail)
- Rank: 95 of 146 (Regional Rail)

Services
Preceding station	SEPTA	Following station
Primos toward Wawa Station	Media/Wawa Line	Gladstone toward Temple University
Preceding station	SEPTA Metro	Following station
North Street toward Chester Pike/Sharon Hill	major stops	Penn Street toward 69th Street T.C.
Location

Clifton–Aldan station is a SEPTA station in Clifton Heights, Pennsylvania. It serves the Media/Wawa Line and is nearby the Clifton–Aldan station of the D. It is located at Springfield Road and West Maryland Avenue and has a 110-space parking lot. In 2013, this station saw 351 boardings and 329 alightings on an average weekday.

== Station layout ==
Clifton–Aldan has two low-level side platforms.

== History ==
According to the Pennsylvania Railroad Stations Past & Present website, Clifton–Aldan station was originally built in 1880 by the Pennsylvania Railroad as Aldan station, in the style of a stone Victorian farm house 2^{1/2} stories high. Parking is available on the south side of the tracks on the corner of Springfield Road and West Maryland Avenue as well as on the north side of the tracks along Jefferson Street between South Springfield Road and South Penn Street.

On May 28, 2009, SEPTA approved a $2.6 million rehabilitation effort which included Clifton–Aldan station.

== Trolley ==
The Clifton–Aldan trolley stop is officially a separate station requiring additional fare. The trolley stop is on the portion of the line where the tracks run on Woodlawn Avenue in mixed traffic rather than on their own right-of-way. Trolleys run beneath a narrow and low 13 feet 4 inches (4.06 m) bridge over Springfield Road with a parallel pedestrian tunnel before approaching the regional railroad station. South of the railroad overpass but north of the trolley stop, the Route D2 line moves from Springfield Road to Woodlawn Avenue. A shelter for the northbound trolley exists on Woodlawn Avenue near the corner of Springfield Road.
