= Cleveland station (Baltimore and Ohio Railroad) =

Former railroad station in Cleveland, Ohio, United States

Cleveland
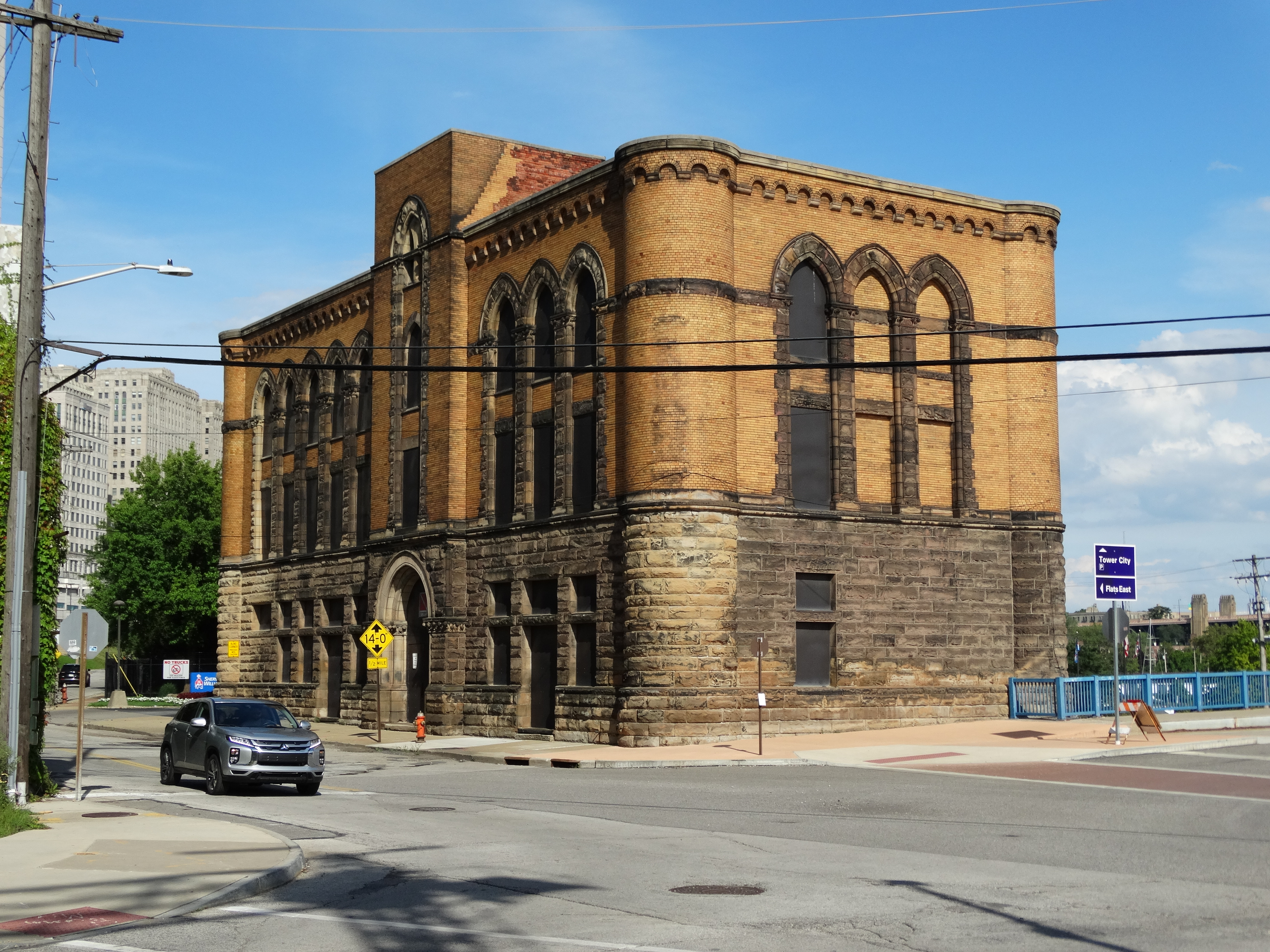

General information
- Location: 829 Canal Road; Cleveland, Ohio; United States
- Coordinates: 41°29′43.7″N 81°41′55.0″W
- Owner: Rock Ventures

Construction
- Architect: William Stillman Dutton
- Architectural style: Romanesque Revival

History
- Opened: July 30, 1898
- Closed: June 16, 1934
- Original company: Cleveland Terminal and Valley Railroad

Former services
| Preceding station | Baltimore and Ohio Railroad | Following station |
|---|---|---|
| Terminus | Cleveland – Akron – Valley Junction (CT&V) | Brooklyn toward Valley Junction |
| Terminus | Cleveland – Sterling – Wheeling (CL&W) | South Brooklyn toward Wheeling |

U.S. Historic district – Contributing property
- Designated: January 22, 2014
- Part of: Cleveland Centre Historic District
- Reference no.: 13001117
Location

Cleveland station is a former train station located in The Flats in downtown Cleveland in the U.S. state of Ohio. The station was completed in 1898 by the Cleveland Terminal and Valley Railroad. After taking control of the Cleveland Terminal and Valley in 1909, the Baltimore and Ohio Railroad operated passenger rail service from the station until 1934 when service was moved to the Cleveland Union Terminal.

== History ==
=== Cleveland Terminal and Valley Railroad ===
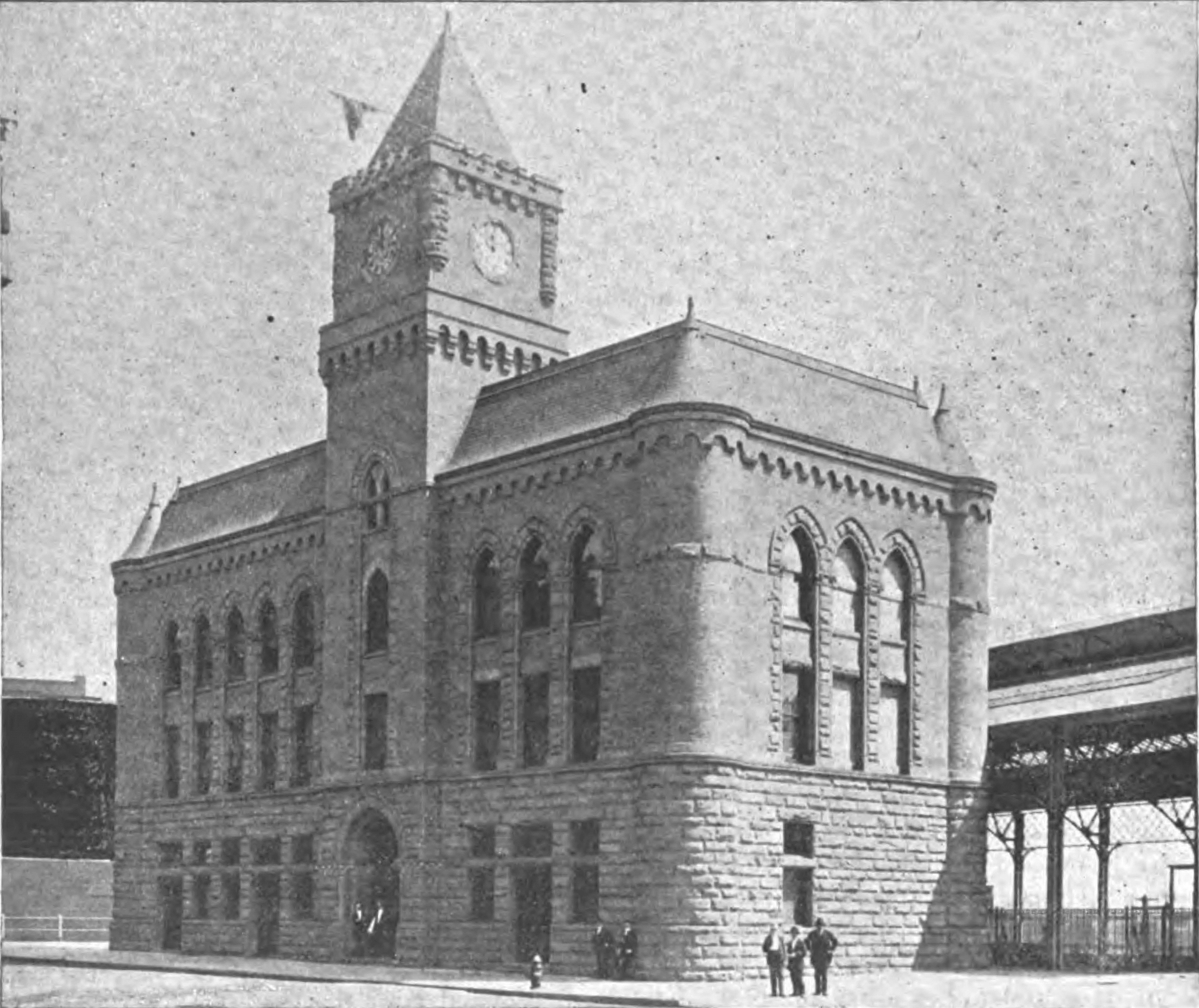
The station in 1898 with its clock tower and mansard roof.

In February 1896, the CT&V announced it would construct new, larger freight and passenger facilities in Cleveland to accommodate the increased business it was doing. The existing depot would be demolished and a new station would take its place. The designs for the new depot were finalized, and construction was started, by September 1897. The station was opened on July 30, 1898 with trains operating from the new station and the CT&V also moving its offices into the building.

=== Baltimore and Ohio Railroad ===
Passenger service from the station ended on June 16, 1934. The next day the B&O moved service to the nearby Cleveland Union Terminal, the fourth railroad in Cleveland to do so.

=== Sherwin-Williams ===
Sherwin-Williams had owned property next the station since it was originally constructed in 1898. The station was designated a contributing property to the Cleveland Centre Historic District on January 22, 2014.

Anticipating the move to its new headquarters building and a new research and development center near Brecksville, Sherwin-Williams sold its properties along the Cuyahoga River, including the vacant station on June 30, 2023 to Bedrock, the real estate investment subsidiary of Rock Ventures owned by Dan Gilbert. Gilbert plans on developing 35 acres (14 ha) of riverfront behind Tower City Center into 3.5 million square feet (330,000 m^{2}) of mixed-use development and green space.

== See also ==
- List of historical passenger rail services in Cleveland

== Sources ==
- "A Model Passenger Station". The Railway Agent and Station Agent. Vol. 20, no. 1. September 1898. pp. 82–85.
- Darbee, Jeffrey; Recchie, Nancy (January 15, 2013). "Cleveland Centre Historic District" (PDF). National Register of Historic Places Registration Form. National Park Service.
