= North Street station =

North St
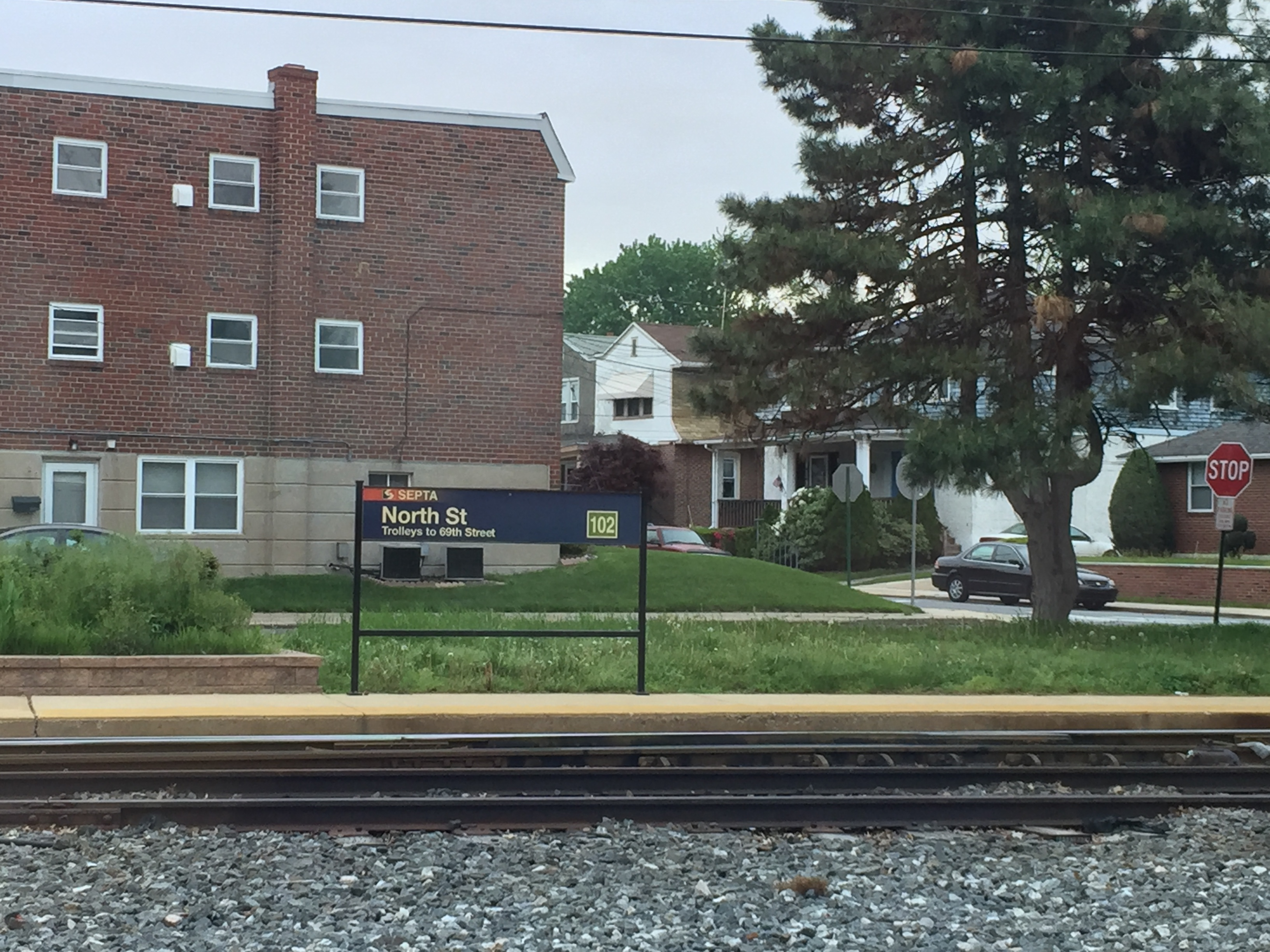

General information
- Location: Woodlawn Avenue & North Street; Collingdale, Pennsylvania.
- Coordinates: 39.9177°N 75.2856°W
- Owner: SEPTA
- Platforms: 2 side platforms
- Tracks: 2

Construction
- Accessible: No

History
- Electrified: Overhead lines

Services
Preceding station	SEPTA Metro	Following station
Andrews Avenue toward Chester Pike/Sharon Hill	major stops	Clifton–Aldan toward 69th Street T.C.
Location

North Street station is a stop on the D in Collingdale, Pennsylvania. It is located at Woodlawn Avenue and North Street.

Trolleys arriving at this station travel between 69th Street Transit Center in Upper Darby Township, Pennsylvania and Sharon Hill, Pennsylvania. The station has a shed with a roof where people can go inside when it is raining. This shed is located between the tracks and Girard Avenue. North Street is where the D2 leaves Woodlawn Avenue itself and runs along a separate right-of-way along the east side of the street. It is also the station where the second track ends along the Sharon Hill line.

In the summer of 2021, the outbound track was extended to just south of the station and a new outbound platform. This was added so that Sharon Hill trolleys no longer have to wait for 69th Street trolleys to exit the station as the single track formerly ended just before entering the station platform. The former switch prior to the station was moved a half block south and the new outbound track extension ends a half block further onward at a bumper, allowing for trolley storage if necessary.
