= Baltimore Avenue station =

Baltimore Av
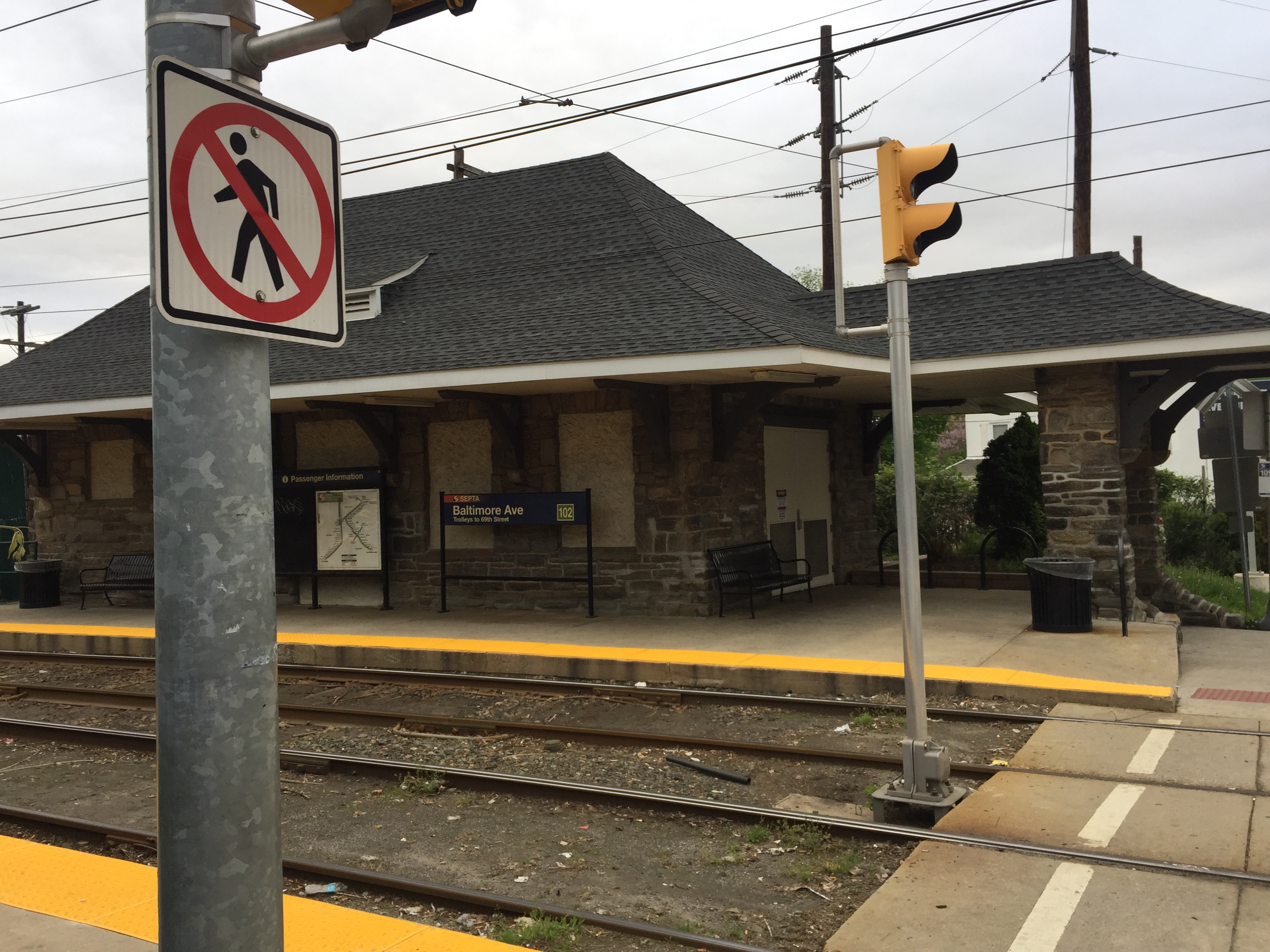

General information
- Location: Baltimore Pike & Odgen Street; Clifton Heights, Pennsylvania
- Coordinates: 39.9312°N 75.2928°W
- Owner: SEPTA
- Platforms: 2 side platforms
- Tracks: 2
- Connections: SEPTA Suburban Bus: 109

Construction
- Accessible: No

History
- Electrified: Overhead lines

Services
Preceding station	SEPTA Metro	Following station
Penn Street toward Chester Pike/Sharon Hill	D (SEPTA Metro)	Creek Road toward 69th Street T.C.
Location

Baltimore Avenue station is a stop on the D in Clifton Heights, Pennsylvania. It is officially located near Baltimore Pike & Odgen Street, however the shed is located on the opposite side of this intersection between Glenwood and Bridge Avenues.

Trolleys arriving at this station travel between 69th Street Transit Center in Upper Darby Township, Pennsylvania and Sharon Hill, Pennsylvania. The station has a shed with a roof where people can go inside when it is raining. Baltimore Avenue is a major stop, not only because it's a commercial strip with a SEPTA bus connection, but because the street itself is also a state highway (State Route 2016) that connects U.S. 1 and U.S. 13.
