= Andrews Avenue station =

Andrews Av
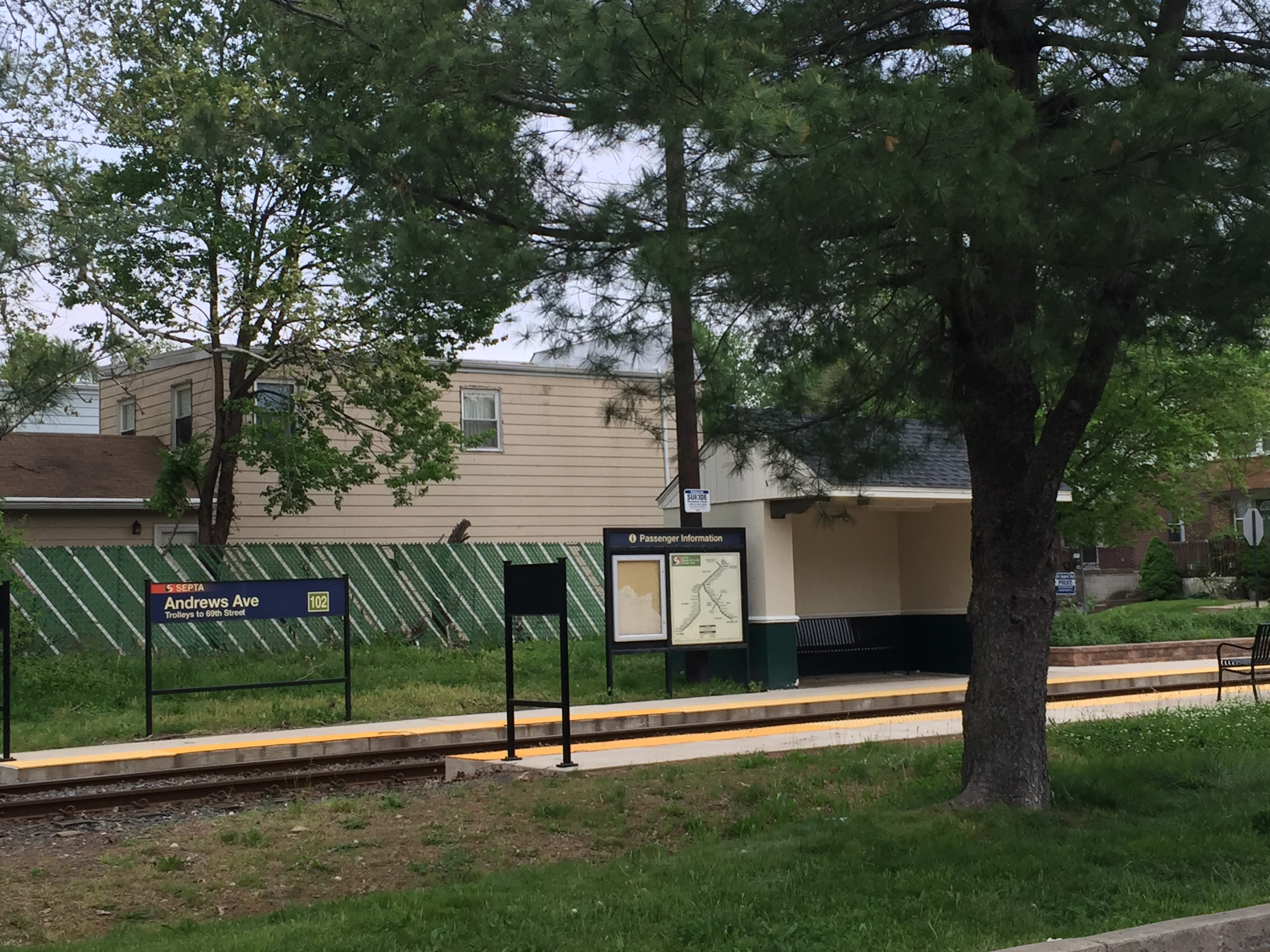

General information
- Location: Woodlawn & Andrews Avenues; Collingdale, Pennsylvania.
- Coordinates: 39.9116°N 75.2820°W
- Owner: SEPTA
- Platforms: 2 side platforms
- Tracks: 1

Construction
- Parking: No
- Accessible: No

History
- Electrified: Overhead lines

Services
Preceding station	SEPTA Metro	Following station
MacDade Boulevard toward Chester Pike/Sharon Hill	D (SEPTA Metro)	North Street major stops toward 69th Street T.C.
Location

Andrews Avenue station is a stop on the D in Collingdale, Pennsylvania. The station is officially located at Woodlawn & Andrews Avenues. This is the third to last station stop on the D2, and the second to last stop to run along Woodlawn Avenue.

Trolleys arriving at this station travel between 69th Street Transit Center in Upper Darby Township, Pennsylvania and Chester Pike (US 13) in Sharon Hill, Pennsylvania. The station has a shed with a roof where people can go inside when it is raining. This shed is located on the north side of the grade crossing with Andrews Avenue at the end of a sidewalk platform. Because the stop is in a residential area, no parking is available.
