= Gladstone station (SEPTA) =

Railway station in Lansdowne, Pennsylvania

Gladstone
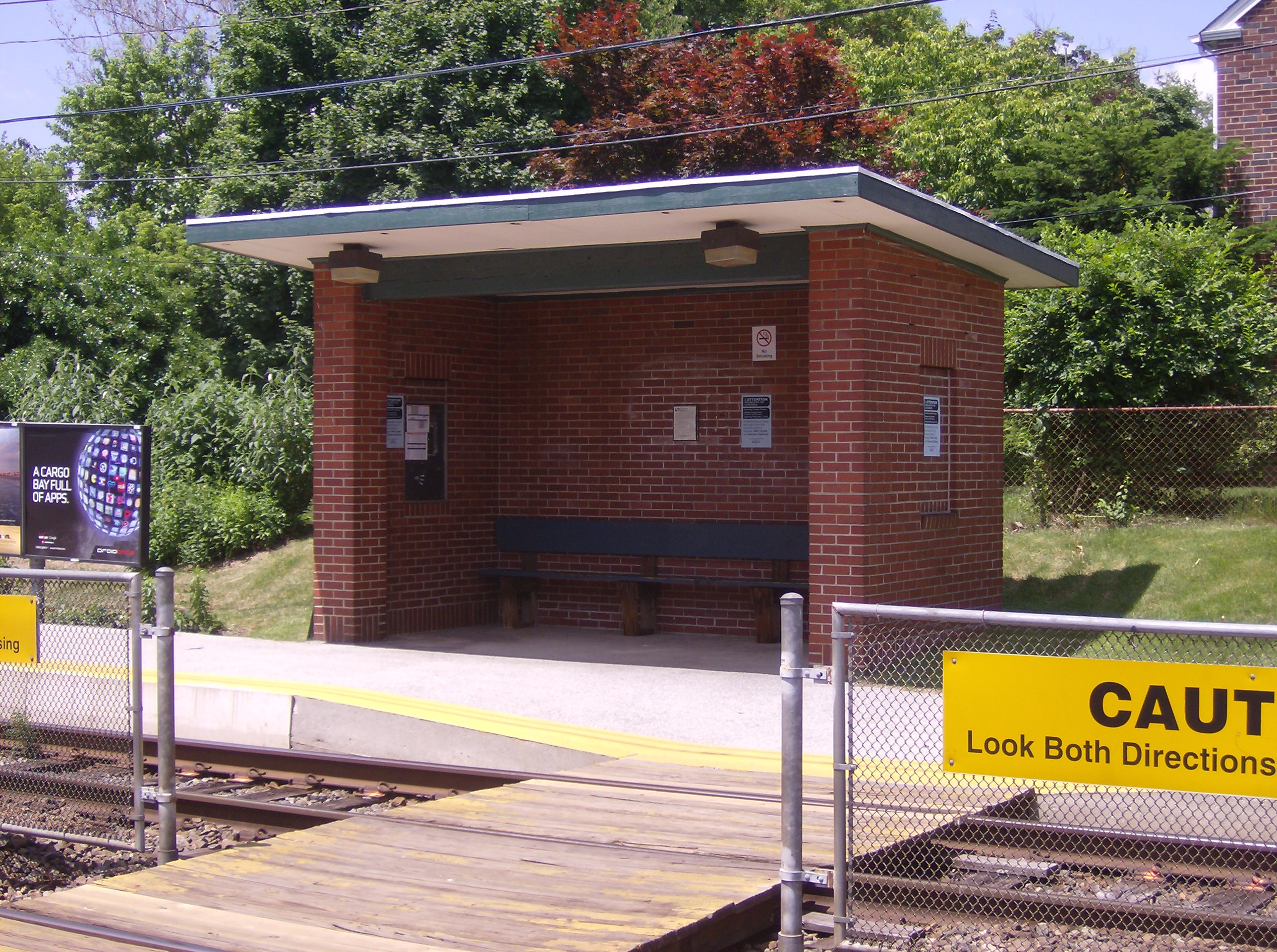

General information
- Location: 198 Walsh Road; Lansdowne, Pennsylvania
- Coordinates: 39.93277°N 75.28218°W
- Owner: SEPTA
- Platforms: 2 side platforms
- Tracks: 2

Construction
- Accessible: No

Other information
- Fare zone: 2

History
- Opened: November 15, 1853
- Electrified: December 2, 1928
- Former names: Kellyville; Burmont

Services
Preceding station	SEPTA	Following station
Clifton–Aldan toward Wawa Station	Media/Wawa Line	Lansdowne toward Temple University
Former services
Preceding station	Pennsylvania Railroad	Following station
Clifton toward West Chester	West Chester Line	Lansdowne toward Suburban Station
Location

Gladstone station is a SEPTA Regional Rail station which is located in Lansdowne, Pennsylvania. Situated at Walsh and Madison Roads, it serves the Media/Wawa Line.

== History and architectural features ==
In 2013, this station saw 208 boardings and 275 alightings on an average weekday.

The station includes a 108-space parking lot; additional parking may be found on the opposite side of the tracks off Scottdale Road, which itself runs along Darby Creek, both of which are under a train trestle west of the station.

Prior to being named Gladstone, this station was known as Burmont; before that, it was known as Kellyville.

== Station layout ==
Gladstone has two low-level side platforms with a connecting pathway across the tracks.
