= Fernwood–Yeadon station =

Railway station in Lansdowne, Pennsylvania

Fernwood – Yeadon
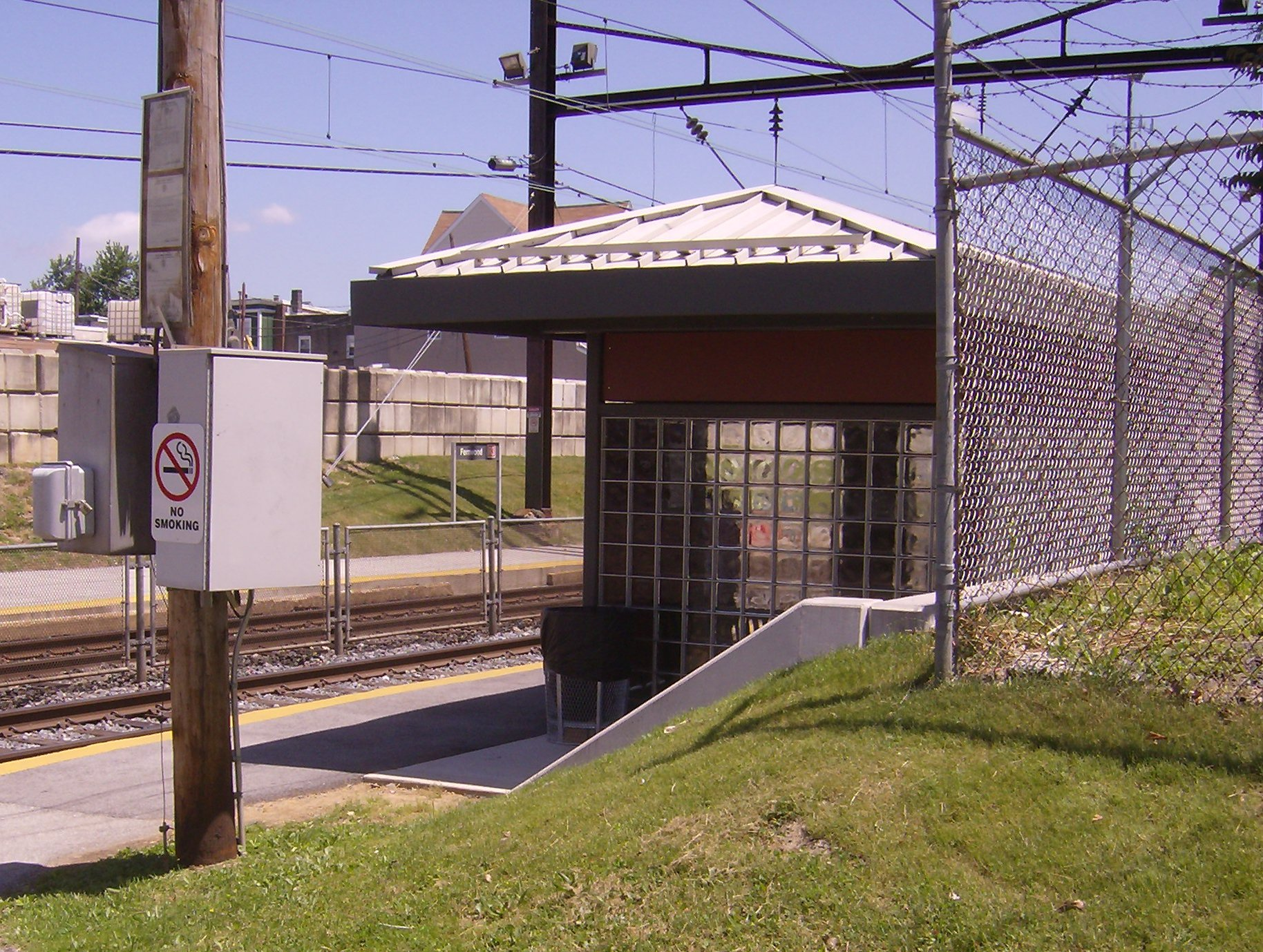

General information
- Location: 413 South Church Lane (US 13); Lansdowne, Pennsylvania
- Coordinates: 39.93967°N 75.25637°W
- Owner: SEPTA
- Platforms: 2 side platforms
- Tracks: 2
- Connections: SEPTA Suburban Bus: 108

Construction
- Platform levels: 1
- Parking: Yes
- Accessible: No

Other information
- Fare zone: 2

History
- Electrified: December 2, 1928

Services
Preceding station	SEPTA	Following station
Lansdowne toward Wawa Station	Media/Wawa Line	Angora toward Temple University
Former services
Preceding station	Pennsylvania Railroad	Following station
Lansdowne toward West Chester	West Chester Line	Angora toward Suburban Station
Location

Fernwood–Yeadon station (originally Fernwood station) is a SEPTA Regional Rail station in Yeadon, Pennsylvania. It serves the Media/Wawa Line and is located at Church Lane (US 13) and Penn Boulevard. The station saw 113 boardings and 132 alightings on an average weekday. The station originally had a wooden pedestrian bridge and a grade crossing.

Fernwood–Yeadon station is east of the terminus of the former Newtown Square Branch and the Cardington Branch of the Pennsylvania Railroad. 1.5 miles from the station is the Yeadon Loop, which is the terminus for the Route 13 trolley of the SEPTA Subway-Surface Trolley Lines. Two bus routes (68 and 108) connecting to this station intersect with the Route 13 line.

== Station layout ==
Fernwood–Yeadon has two low-level side platforms.
