= Creek Road station =

Creek Rd
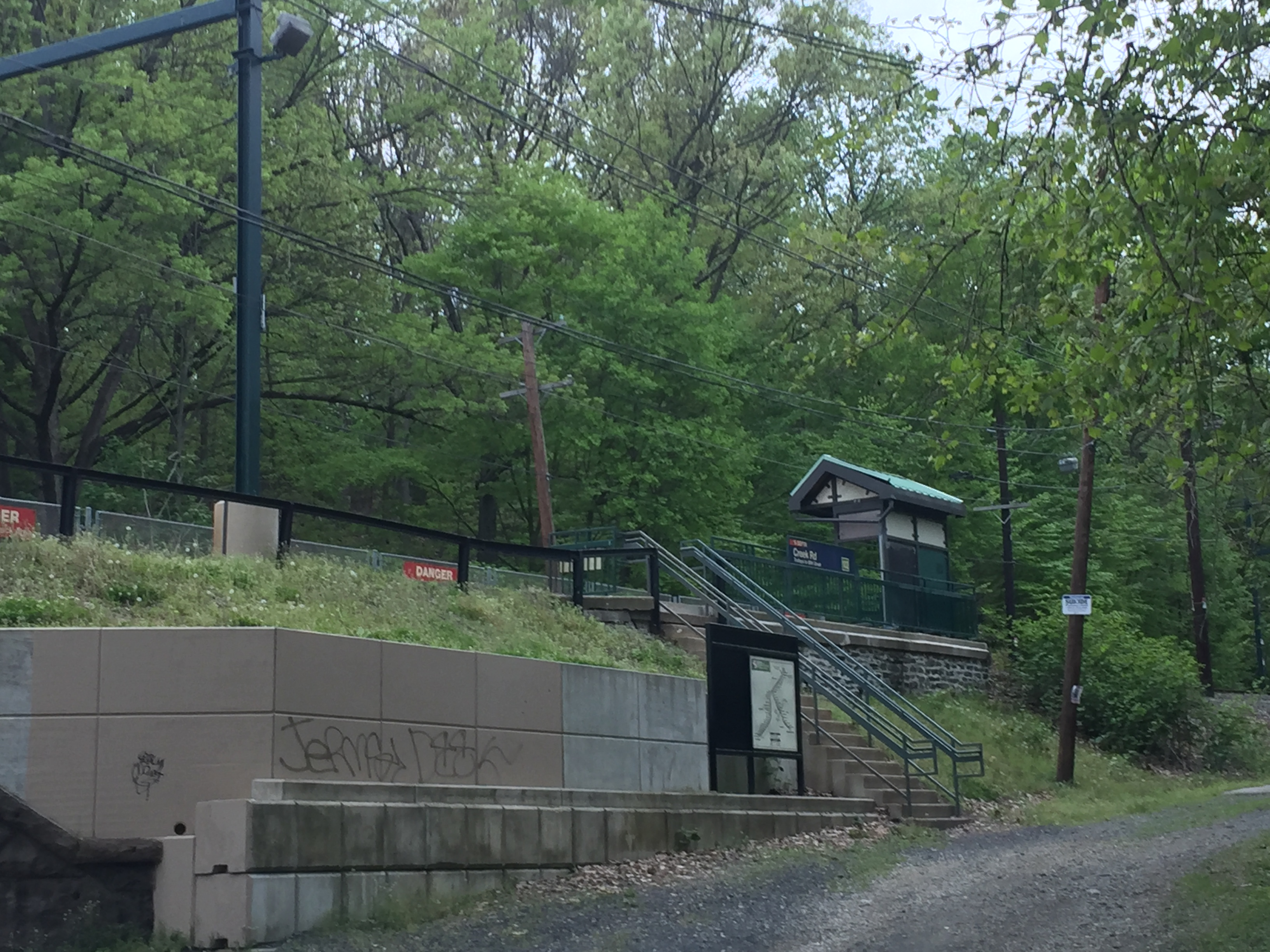

General information
- Location: Darby Creek Road at Railroad; Drexel Hill, Pennsylvania.
- Coordinates: 39.9354°N 75.2952°W
- Owner: SEPTA
- Platforms: 2 side platforms
- Tracks: 2

Construction
- Accessible: No

History
- Electrified: Overhead lines
- Former names: Oakview

Passengers
- 21 Boardings per Weekday (2018)

Services
Preceding station	SEPTA Metro	Following station
Baltimore Avenue toward Chester Pike/Sharon Hill	D (SEPTA Metro)	Marshall Road toward 69th Street T.C.
Location

Creek Road station (formerly Oakview) is a stop on the D in Drexel Hill, Pennsylvania. It is located at the end of Station Road north of Creek Road (although SEPTA gives the address as being at Darby Creek Road at Railroad) within Indian Rock Park, a 21.9-acre (89,000 m^{2}) Natural Environmental Park in Drexel Hill, containing picnic tables, playground equipment, basketball courts, and Darby Creek.

Trolleys arriving at this station travel between 69th Street Transit Center in Upper Darby Township, Pennsylvania and Sharon Hill, Pennsylvania. Oakview might have little significance were it not for the fact that the stop is near the bridge over Darby Creek and Creek Road. Besides the aforementioned features within Indian Rock Park, the street leads to a historic Swedish Log Cabin built sometime around 1654, which is believed to be the oldest log house in North America.

The station is the least used on the 102 trolley line with 21 boardings per weekday in 2018.
