= Steeler (train) =

Morning Steeler; Afternoon Steeler
Overview
- Service type: Inter-city rail
- Status: Discontinued
- Locale: Midwestern United States
- First service: 1948
- Last service: 1958
- Former operator(s): Pennsylvania Railroad

Route
- Termini: Cleveland, Ohio; Pittsburgh, Pennsylvania
- Distance travelled: 138.1 miles (222.3 km)
- Service frequency: Daily (morning and afternoon itineraries)
- Train number(s): Morning Steeler 360, eastbound, 363 westbound Afternoon Steeler 362 eastbound, 361 westbound

On-board services
- Seating arrangements: coach
- Catering facilities: dining lounge cars
- Observation facilities: parlor cars

The Morning Steeler and Afternoon Steeler were a pair of passenger trains operated by the Pennsylvania Railroad between Pittsburgh, Pennsylvania's Union Station and Cleveland, Ohio's Pennsylvania Station, the former Union Depot. The original Steeler was at one time the fastest train between the two cities, but the service lasted less than a dozen years.

The service began on December 12, 1948 as the Steeler, a single round-trip between Pittsburgh and Cleveland. It departed Cleveland in the morning and returned from Pittsburgh in the late afternoon. Its travel time of 2 hours and 40 minutes was, at the time, the fastest between the two cities. At first the Steeler made just two intermediate stops, in Alliance and Hudson, Ohio. On April 30, 1950, the Pennsylvania inaugurated a second round-trip between the two cities, adding a morning departure from Pittsburgh and a corresponding afternoon return from Cleveland. The morning pair were dubbed the Morning Steeler and the afternoon pair the Afternoon Steeler. Pittsburgh Steelers head coach John Michelosen was on hand to christen the new service. Prior to this the Pennsylvania had five daily round-trips between the two cities: the Steeler, Clevelander, and three additional unnamed pairs. The Steeler carried both a parlor and a "dining lounge" car in addition to coaches.

The Pennsylvania discontinued the Morning Steeler on September 7, 1957. The railroad cited competition from the newly completed Ohio Turnpike; daily patronage had fallen to 35 and yearly losses totaled $41,000. Its discontinuance left two Pennsylvania trains, the Afternoon Steeler and the Clevelander, between Pittsburgh and Cleveland. The Afternoon Steeler survived another year, ending on June 28, 1958. At the insistence of the Pennsylvania Utility Commission a rump version of the Steeler continued to operate as a commuter train to Beaver Falls, Pennsylvania until late July.
