= Lansdowne station (SEPTA) =

Railway station in Lansdowne, Pennsylvania

Lansdowne
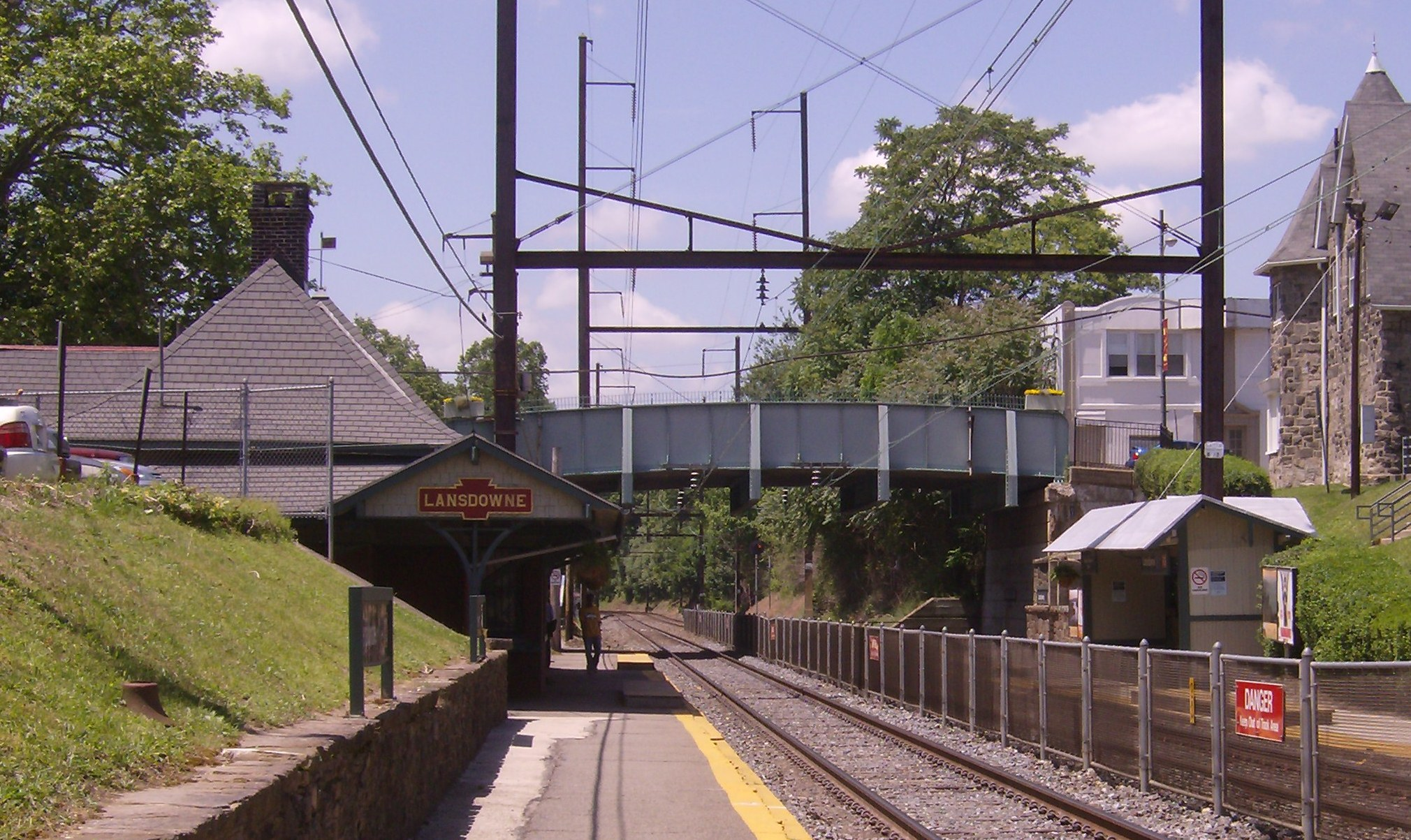
- Lansdowne station, looking west.

General information
- Location: 45 South Lansdowne Avenue; Lansdowne, Pennsylvania
- Coordinates: 39.93726°N 75.27165°W
- Owner: SEPTA
- Platforms: 2 side platforms
- Tracks: 2
- Connections: SEPTA Suburban Bus: 109, 113

Construction
- Parking: 91 free/62 with permits
- Cycle facilities: Yes
- Accessible: No

Other information
- Fare zone: 2

History
- Opened: 1880
- Electrified: December 2, 1928

Passengers
- 2017: 321 boardings 337 alightings (weekday average)
- Rank: 82 of 146

Services
Preceding station	SEPTA	Following station
Gladstone toward Wawa Station	Media/Wawa Line	Fernwood–Yeadon toward Temple University
Former services
Preceding station	Pennsylvania Railroad	Following station
Gladstone toward West Chester	West Chester Line	Fernwood toward Suburban Station
Location

Lansdowne station is a SEPTA railway station in Lansdowne, Pennsylvania. It serves the Media/Wawa Line. The station was originally built in 1880 by the Pennsylvania Railroad. In 2013, this station saw 313 boardings and 394 alightings on an average weekday. It is located at Scottdale Road and South Lansdowne Avenue and has an 89-car parking lot.

== Station layout ==
Lansdowne has two low-level side platforms.
