= MacDade Boulevard station =

MacDade Blvd
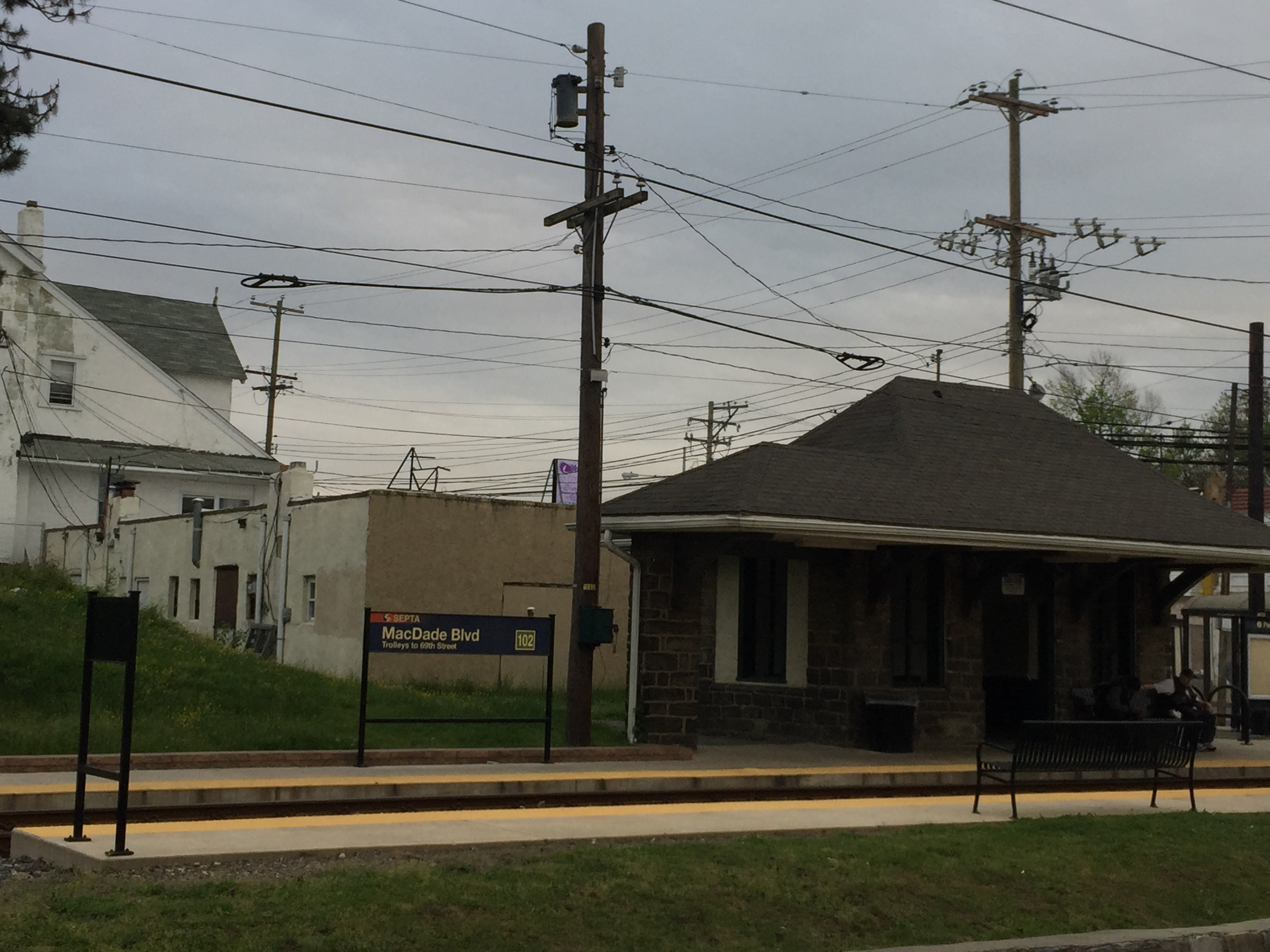

General information
- Location: Woodlawn Avenue & MacDade Boulevard; Collingdale, Pennsylvania, U.S.
- Coordinates: 39.9103°N 75.2810°W
- Owner: SEPTA
- Platforms: 1 side platform
- Tracks: 1
- Connections: SEPTA Suburban Bus: 113

Construction
- Accessible: No

History
- Electrified: Overhead lines
- Former names: Collingdale

Services
Preceding station	SEPTA Metro	Following station
Chester Pike/Sharon Hill Terminus	D (SEPTA Metro)	Andrews Avenue toward 69th Street T.C.
Location

MacDade Boulevard station (formerly Collingdale) is a stop on the D in Collingdale, Pennsylvania. The station is located on MacDade Boulevard. It is the last stop before Sharon Hill, and the last stop to run along Woodlawn Avenue. Trolleys arriving at this station travel between 69th Street Transit Center in Upper Darby Township, Pennsylvania and Chester Pike down in Sharon Hill, Pennsylvania. The station has a shed with a roof where people can go inside when it is raining.

Between the MacDade Boulevard and Sharon Hill stops, CSX's Philadelphia Subdivision freight line bridge crosses over the tracks. The line dips very low under the freight line as a result, flooding occurs in the underpass with shuttle buses between the two stations being used as substitutes for trolley cars.
