= Grassland station =

Former train station in Pennsylvania, U.S.

Grassland
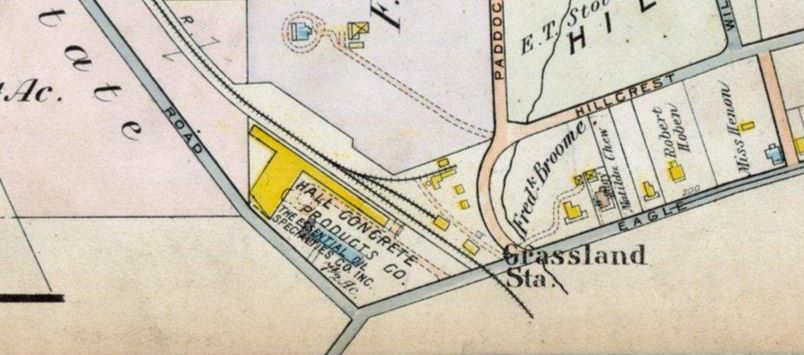
- 1908 Main Line Atlas showing the location of Grassland station

General information
- Location: Hillcrest and Eagle Roads, Haverford Township, Delaware County, Pennsylvania
- Coordinates: 39°59′2″N 75°19′0″W
- System: Former Pennsylvania Railroad station
Location

Grassland is an abandoned train station located at the intersection of Hillcrest and Eagle Roads in Haverford Township, Pennsylvania. The station was a stop on the Pennsylvania Railroad 's (PRR) Newtown Square Branch.

The station opened in 1888 with the opening of the line to Newtown Square, Pennsylvania. The station served as the Grassland, Pennsylvania post office from 1898 to 1900. The Philadelphia Chewing Gum Corporation used the station for freight transport, but it also served for passenger use as well. Service past Grassland station ended in 1963 due to the deterioration of the bridges past that point and all service on the line ceased by 1981. The tracks at the station have since been removed and the station building now part of a residential unit.
