= Stars Hall of Fame =

Six Flags wax museum

Orlando, FL
- Area: 6825 Starway Drive, Orlando, FL. 32809
- Opening date: May 10, 1975; 51 years ago

Ride statistics
- Attraction type: Wax Museum

Stars Hall of Fame was a wax museum located in Orlando, Florida.

== History ==
In 1970, the Great Southwest Corporation who owned and operated the Six Flags theme parks, acquired the Movieland Wax Museum for $1,500,000.

The project was announced in December 1973, but then in January 1974, it was revealed construction would be delayed while "assessing specific government programs affecting the energy crisis." The creation of the wax figures, and scenes were continuing without interruption. Preview center opened October 29, 1974.

The grand-opening celebration was attended by over 800 guests, including Gloria Swanson, Glenn Ford, Cliff Robertson, Dina Merrill, and Tom Kennedy, with Swanson giving the dedication speech. "In our dedication of the Stars Hall of Fame, the artists represented here honor it, too... they gave freely of themselves, their hearts, their passions and emotions to bring pleasure to all people of the world. They did so with a true and unsparing commitment to their craft... This building pays tribute to them and will keep the memory of their extraordinary contribution alive in human hears for all time to come."

Bally Manufacturing acquired Six Flags in 1982, and sold off the Stars Hall of Fame because it didn't fit into their master plans. The building was taken over by Harcourt Brace Jovanovich and opened as a bookstore, Places of Learning, on October 15, 1985.

== Figures displayed ==
- Clark Gable in Gone with the Wind
- Marlon Brando in The Godfather
- The Cartwrights from Bonanza
- Elizabeth Taylor in Cleopatra
- Humphrey Bogart and Katharine Hepburn in The African Queen

== See also ==
- Madame Tussauds
- Movieland Wax Museum
