= Newtown Square Branch =

Former railroad in Pennsylvania, United States

Map of the Philadelphia and Delaware County Railroad

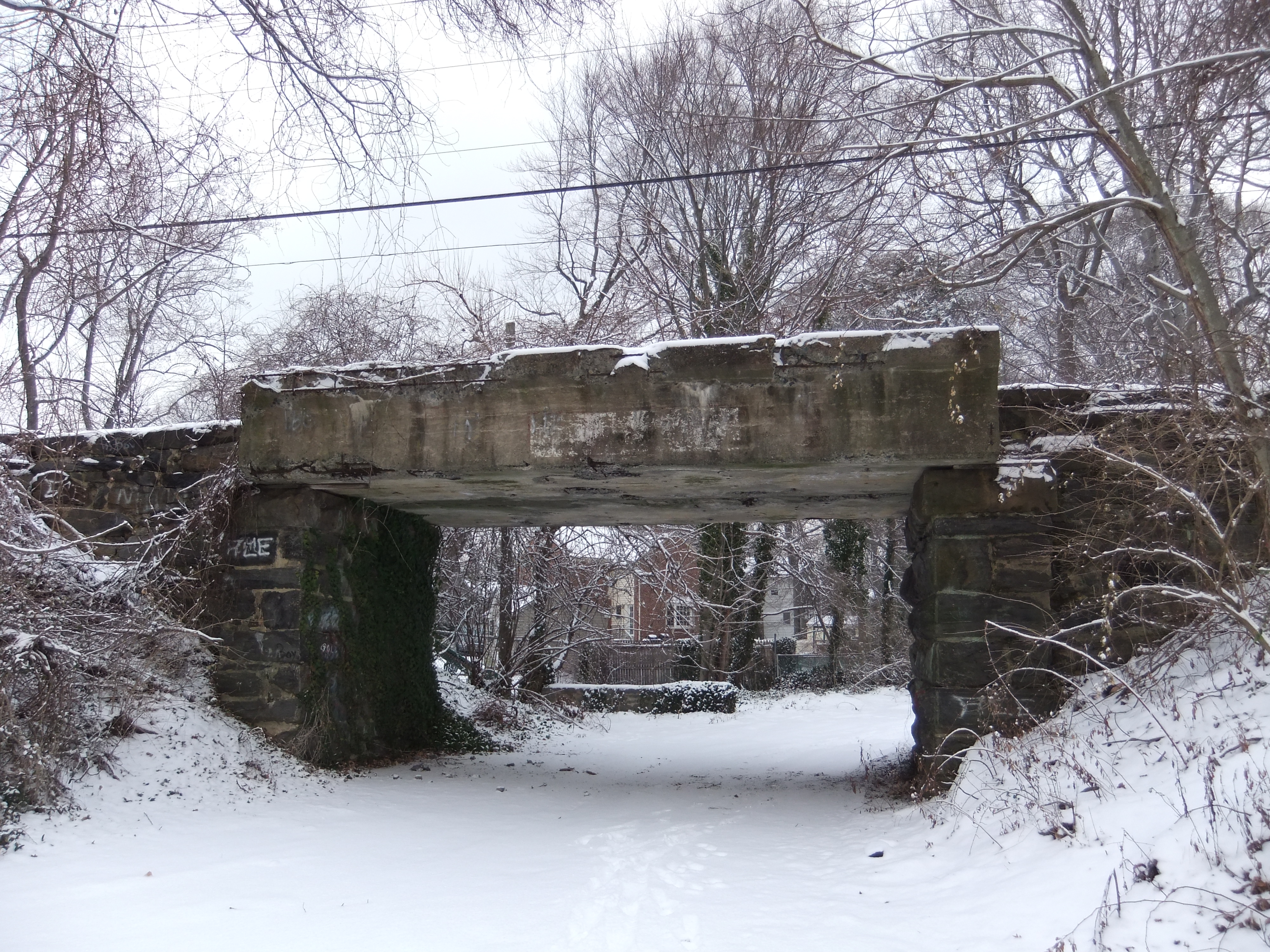
A small bridge over Harvard Road in Haverford, Pennsylvania

The Newtown Square Branch was a branch line of the Pennsylvania Railroad (PRR) that diverged from the West Chester Branch in Yeadon, Pennsylvania, and ended in Newtown Square, Pennsylvania.

Built as the Philadelphia & Delaware County Railroad in 1888, it was taken over by a subsidiary of the Pennsylvania Railroad in 1894. The Cardington Branch to Millbourne Mills opened the following year in 1895, establishing a connection for freight interchange between the PRR system and the Philadelphia & Western Railroad. Passenger service ran on the Newtown Square Branch until it was terminated in 1908 due to competition from the parallel West Chester Traction Company trolley lines. Of the ten passenger stations along the line, all except Llanerch and Newtown Square were flag stops. These latter two stations featured single-story frame station houses.

The physical plant of the Newtown Square Branch consisted of a yard at Pembroke just past Fernwood Junction, and seven stations. The stations were Garrett Road, Arlington, Llanerch, Grassland, Brookethorpe, Foxcroft, The Hunt, and Newtown Square. Major bridges were at Baltimore Avenue, Naylor's Run, Darby Creek, and a large trestle over Bryn Mawr Avenue. The stone piers from the Darby Creek bridge are still extant, while large concrete abutments remain visible on the west side of Bryn Mawr Avenue south of Goshen Road.

Service past Grassland station (Eagle Road) ended in 1963 due to the deterioration of several bridges west of that point, and service on the remainder of the line ended in 1981. Conrail obtained permission to abandon the line in 1982 and removed the tracks and most bridges in 1985. The roadbed remains largely intact, though some parts are overgrown with weeds and trees. In some cases, private business has obliterated portions of the right-of-way. Several areas of the roadbed are accessible to the public, mainly in Naylor Run Park in Upper Darby Township, and along the Pennsy Trail in Havertown. Few bridges remain, with the bridge over Baltimore Avenue located at the Upper Darby/East Lansdowne border having been removed in 2003. The only remaining visible rail is at the junction just west of SEPTA's Fernwood-Yeadon Station. Through Upper Darby Township, PECO's high tension power lines run along the right-of-way from Fernwood to the Upper Darby/Haverford border at Lansdowne Avenue and Township Line Road.

At the intersection of Darby Road and West Chester Pike, Haverford Township has created a small park, Llanerch Crossing Park. The Park commemorates the "Battle of Llanerch Junction", an 1895 confrontation at that site between track workers from the P&DC and the Philadelphia and West Chester Traction Company. Interpretive signs and two murals describe the history of Llanerch Junction.

The western terminus of the line was the Powell Lumber Yard on Newtown Street Road in Newtown Square. The lumber yard burned down in the 1980s. The old freight station was threatened with demolition in the late 1990s. The Newtown Square Historical Preservation Society raised money to have the old freight station moved to its current location west of town at the Drexel Lodge property on West Chester Pike. The Newtown Square Railroad Museum has been created at that location, with engines and other rolling stock, and memorabilia related to the line.

== Station list ==
Locality	Milepost	Station	Lat/long	Notes/Connections
Newtown Square	15.4	Newtown Square		Physical building moved to West Chester Pike and is currently used as the Newtown Square Railroad Museum.
Radnor Township	13.4	The Hunt		
Marple Township	12.7	Foxcroft		
Haverford Township	11.8	Brookethrope		
Oakmont in Havertown	10.3	Grassland		Served the Philadelphia Chewing Gum Corporation factory.
Llanerch	8.9	Llanerch		
Highland Park	8.0	Arlington		
Upper Darby Township	7.3	Garrett Road		Media–Sharon Hill Line bridge over the R.O.W. still exists today
Lansdowne	6.8	Wycombe		
Pembroke	6.1	Pembroke		
Cardington Branch converges
Yeadon	5.5	Fernwood	39°56′22.81″N 75°15′22.93″W	
Line abandoned in 1981
