= Penn Street station =

Penn St
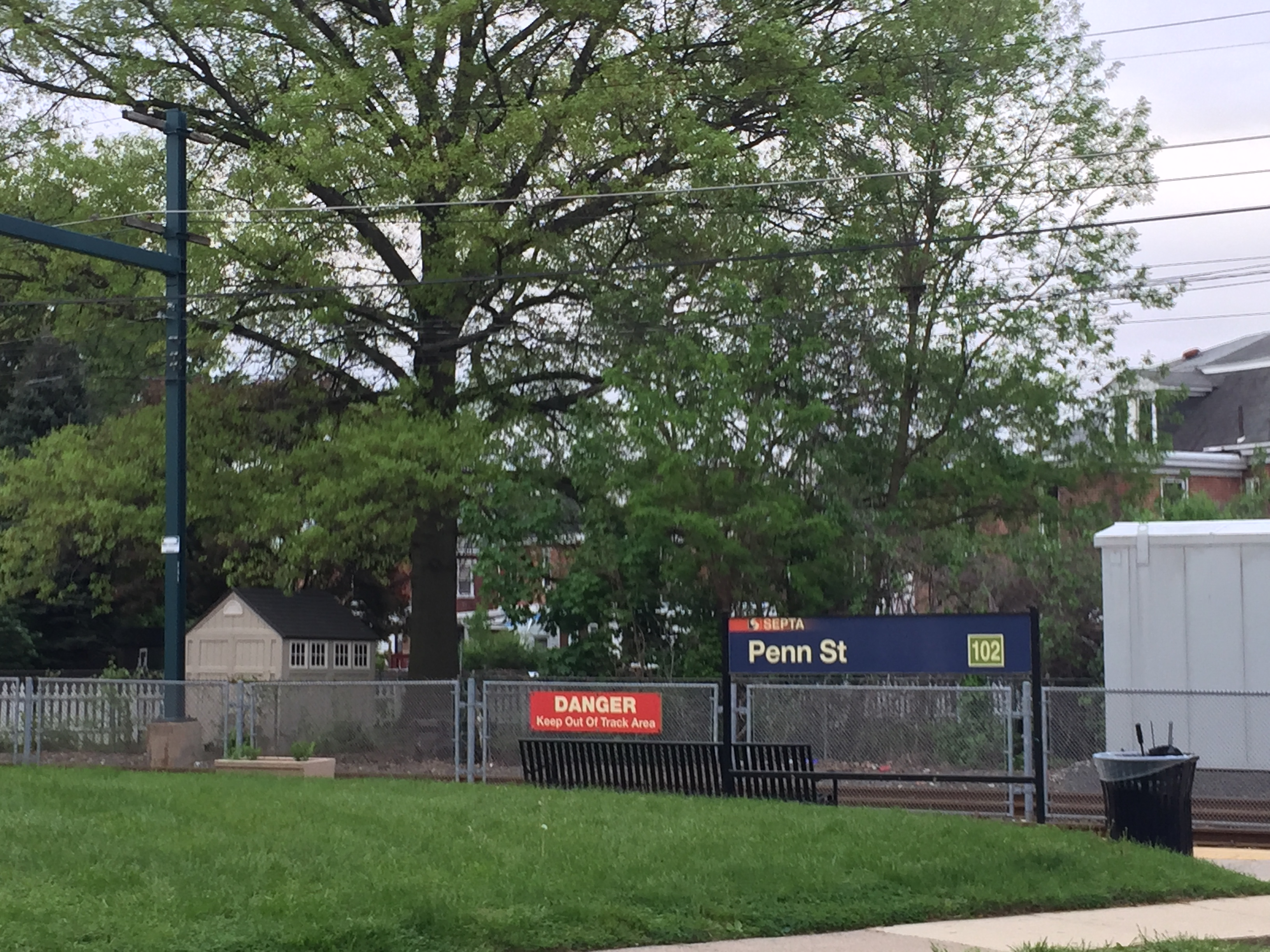

General information
- Location: Penn Street near Broadway Avenue; Clifton Heights, Pennsylvania.
- Coordinates: 39.9288°N 75.2920°W
- Owner: SEPTA
- Platforms: 2 side platforms
- Tracks: 2

Construction
- Structure type: Open acrylic glass shelter
- Parking: No
- Accessible: No

History
- Electrified: Overhead lines

Services
| Preceding station | SEPTA Metro | Following station |
|---|---|---|
| Clifton–Aldan major stops toward Chester Pike/Sharon Hill | D (SEPTA Metro) | Baltimore Avenue toward 69th Street T.C. |
Location

Penn Street station is a stop on the D in Clifton Heights, Pennsylvania. It is officially located near Penn Street and Broadway Avenue, although the actual location on Penn Street is halfway between Broadway and Berkley Avenues. Because the station runs through a residential neighborhood, no parking is available.

Trolleys arriving at this station travel between 69th Street Transit Center in Upper Darby Township, Pennsylvania and Sharon Hill, Pennsylvania. The tracks cross all three of the streets mentioned above. They run directly south before curving to the southwest as they cross the intersection of Broadway Avenue and Ogden Street. At Penn Street itself, there are two platforms, one on the northeast corner of the crossing, and another on the southwest corner of the crossing. The southwest platform runs in front of a small children's playground on the northwest corner of Penn Street and Berkley Avenue, and contains a small open acrylic glass shelter. The tracks cross Berkley Avenue east of the intersection of a cul-de-sac, before leaving the right-of-way to run along Springfield Road.
