= Cleveland, Painesville and Ashtabula Railroad (1879–1882) =

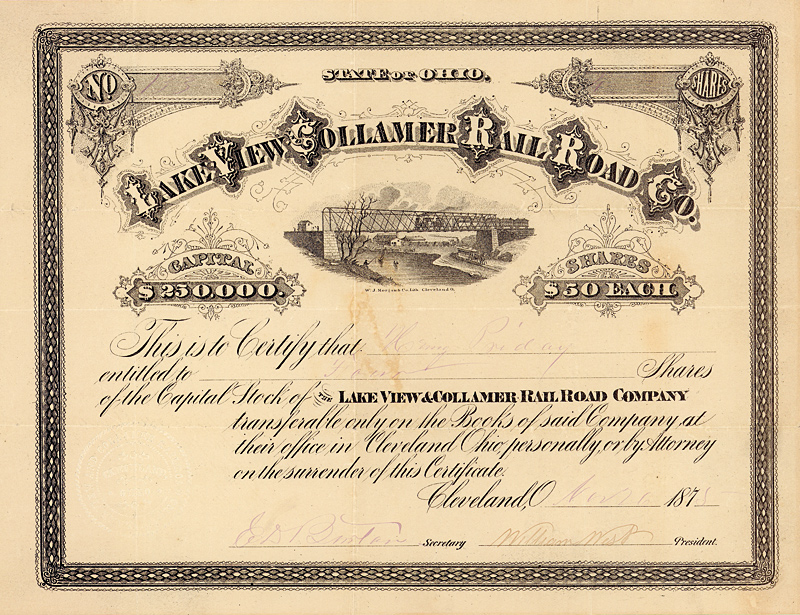
Share of the Lake View & Collamer Railroad Co. from the 26. November 1878

The Lake View and Collamer Railroad opened on May 1, 1875, on the east side of Cleveland.

The railroad extended from near the intersection of Becker Avenue and Superior Street, where it connected to the Superior Street Railway, in Cleveland to Euclid Village, a distance of 6.86 miles. About 2.5 miles of the Lake View and Collamer Railroad was inside the city of Cleveland where it ran parallel to and a short distance north of Superior Street. The remainder of the railroad ran north-east to Euclid, parallel to Euclid Avenue.

== History ==
In August 1879 after a roundhouse fire, the Lake View and Collamer Railroad was sold at foreclosure sale and then operated as the Cleveland, Painesville and Ashtabula Railroad (not to be confused with the older railroad of the same name). The New York, Chicago and St. Louis Railway (Nickel Plate) acquired control in 1882, and the part parallel to Euclid Avenue became part of its main line.

== Sources ==
- Rehor, John A. (1994). The Nickel Plate story. Kalmbach Publishing Co., Waukesha, WI. ISBN 0-89024-012-4.
