= Pennsylvania Company =

Former American holding company

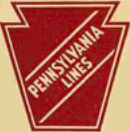

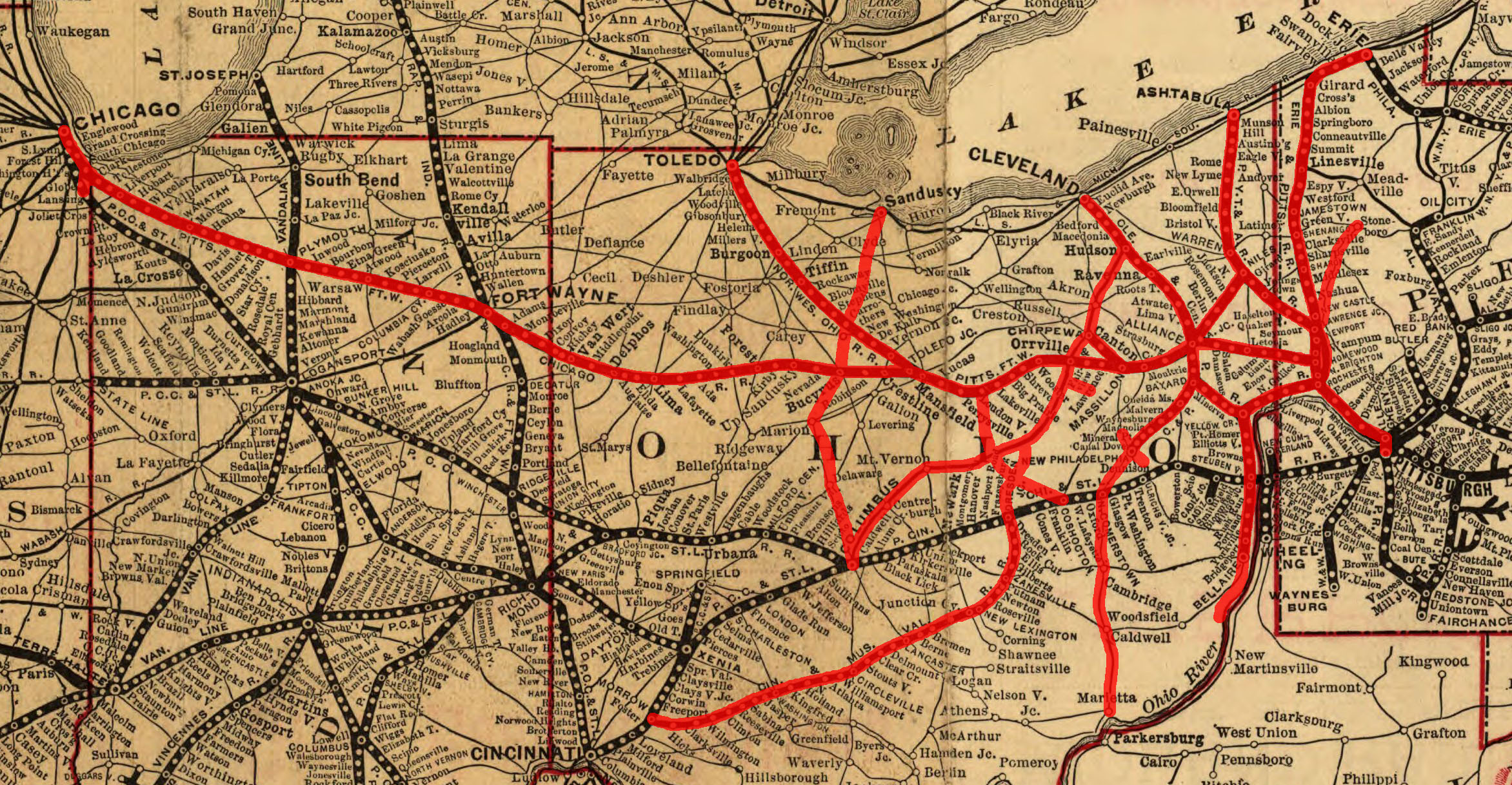
- Lines operated by the Pennsylvania Company

Overview
- Reporting mark: PRR
- Locale: Pittsburgh, PA to Chicago, IL
- Dates of operation: April 1, 1871–January 1, 1921
- Successor: Pennsylvania Railroad

Technical
- Track gauge: 4 ft 8 1/2 in (1,435 mm) standard gauge

The Pennsylvania Company was a major holding company. It included the Pittsburgh, Fort Wayne and Chicago Railway, the PRR's main route to Chicago. Together with the Pittsburgh, Cincinnati, Chicago and St. Louis Railroad and Vandalia Railroad, the three railroads were branded by the PRR as Pennsylvania Lines West of Pittsburgh. All lines west merged into the Pennsylvania Railroad in 1921.

== History ==
The Pennsylvania Company was incorporated April 7, 1870 in Pennsylvania as a holding company with a broad charter. It was organized June 1, with president William Thaw of the PRR. Tom Scott replaced Thaw as the president January 20, 1871. On April 1 of that year the company began operating several railroads; others were acquired later.

- April 1, 1871: Pittsburgh, Fort Wayne and Chicago Railway – main line direct from Pittsburgh, Pennsylvania, to Chicago
- April 1, 1871: Erie and Pittsburgh Railroad – main line from Pittsburgh north to Erie, Pennsylvania
- April 1, 1871: Indianapolis and Vincennes Railroad (merged into the Vandalia Railroad, PRR-owned, PCC&St.L operated, January 1, 1905)
- April 1, 1871: Lawrence Railroad (merged into the YL&P June 1, 1887)
- April 1, 1871: New Castle and Beaver Valley Railroad (merged into the PY&A January 1, 1906)
- December 1, 1871: Cleveland and Pittsburgh Railroad – Acquired from Jay Gould control, previously a joint operation with PFW&C between Rochester, PA and Pittsburgh.
- January 1, 1873: Columbus and Shelby Railroad (merged into the JM&I November 18, 1881)
- January 1, 1873: Jeffersonville, Madison and Indianapolis Railroad (merged into the Pittsburgh, Cincinnati, Chicago and St. Louis Railway, PRR-owned but not Pennsylvania Company operated, October 1, 1890)
- January 1, 1873: Lake Erie and Louisville Railroad (merged into the JM&I June 26, 1890)
- January 1, 1873: Louisville Bridge Company (began operating itself October 1, 1890)
- January 1, 1873: Shelby and Rush Railroad (merged into the JM&I April 10, 1882)
- May 1, 1873: Ashtabula, Youngstown and Pittsburg Rail Road; Ashtabula and Pittsburgh Railway (merged into the AN&Y June 16, 1887)
- May 1, 1873: Mansfield, Coldwater and Lake Michigan Rail Road (merged into the NWO November 28, 1877)
- May 1, 1873: Toledo, Tiffin and Eastern Rail Road; Toledo and Woodville Railroad; Northwestern Ohio Railway (merged into the TWV&O May 23, 1891)
- November 10, 1873: Toledo and State Line Railroad (merged into the TT&E May 1, 1878?)
- September 28, 1880: Massillon and Cleveland Railroad
- October 3, 1881: Meadville Railway (reorganized February 1, 1884 as the non-PRR Meadville and Linesville Railroad)
- August 7, 1882: Alliance, Niles and Ashtabula Railroad (merged into the AN&Y June 16, 1887)
- January 8, 1884: Ohio Valley Railway; Pittsburgh, Ohio Valley and Cincinnati Railroad
- August 18, 1884: New Brighton and New Castle Rail Road (merged into the YL&P June 1, 1887)
- June 1, 1887: Youngstown, Lawrence and Pittsburgh Railroad (merged into the PY&A August 1, 1887)
- June 16, 1887: Ashtabula, Niles and Youngstown Railroad (merged into the PY&A August 1, 1887)
- August 1, 1887: Pittsburgh, Youngstown and Ashtabula Railroad; Pittsburgh, Youngstown and Ashtabula Railway
- October 15, 1887: South Chicago and Southern Railroad
- October 15, 1888: State Line and Indiana City Railway (merged into the SC&S February 5, 1901)
- May 23, 1891: Toledo, Walhonding Valley and Ohio Railroad (merged into the TC&OR July 1, 1911)
- January 1892: Rolling Mill Railroad (merged into the TWV&O January 1, 1904)
- January 8, 1892: Salineville Railroad (merged into the C&P January 1, 1899)
- September 16, 1895: Calumet River Railway (merged into the SC&S February 5, 1901)
- January 1, 1900: Cleveland and Marietta Railway (merged into the TC&OR July 1, 1911)
- August 1, 1900: Western New York and Pennsylvania Railway (only 51.492 miles (83 km), formerly the New Castle and Franklin Railroad from New Castle, Pennsylvania to Stoneboro, Pennsylvania plus branches)
- July 1, 1910: Youngstown and Ravenna Railroad
- July 1, 1911: Toledo, Columbus and Ohio River Railroad
- July 1, 1912: Cleveland, Akron and Cincinnati Railway (company control regained in 1899, previously under control as the Cleveland, Mount Vernon and Delaware Railroad before 1885)

The Pennsylvania Company operated the Erie Canal of Pennsylvania from September 16, 1870, to February 4, 1871.

On January 1, 1918, soon after the United States Railroad Administration took over all U.S. railroads, all Pennsylvania Company leases were transferred to the PRR. On March 1, 1920, when the lines were returned to the PRR, they were separated into four regions – the Eastern Region, Central Region, Northwestern Region and Southwestern Region.

The Pennsylvania Company, however, stayed around as a holding company, and was reincorporated in Delaware on December 12, 1958, and reorganized on December 16. Its new purpose was to diversify into real estate and other fields, and the company lasted through the 1968 PRR merger into Penn Central Transportation.

In 1973 or 1974 several subsidiaries were created – the Pennrec Company for theme park investments (including Six Flags Great Adventure and Stars Hall of Fame), the Penn Orlando Company, and Penn Arlington, Inc. (which bought Six Flags Over Texas from the Great Southwest Corporation).
