= Cleveland Union Depot =

Railway station in Cleveland, Ohio

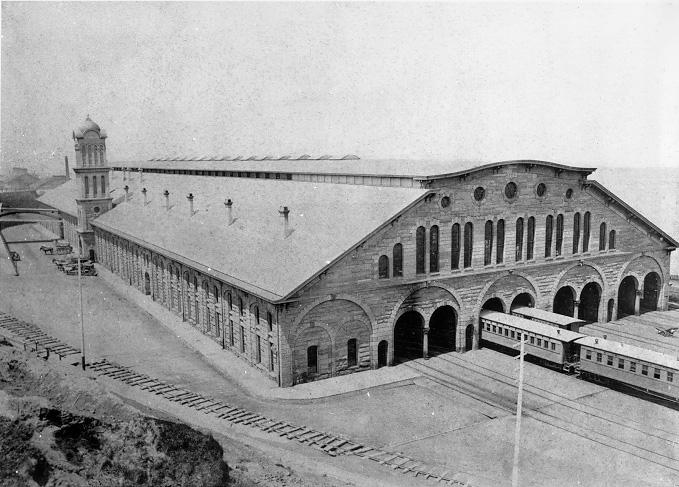
- Union Depot c. 1867

General information
- Coordinates: 41.502403°N 81.701568°W

Key dates
- Opened: 1853
- Rebuilt: 1866
- Closed: September 26, 1953
- Demolished: 1959

Former services
Location

Union Depot was the name given to two intercity railroad stations in Cleveland, Ohio. Union Depot was built as the first union station in Cleveland in 1853. A new structure was built in 1866, and it was the largest train station in the United States until the construction of Grand Central Depot in New York City in 1871. The depot was operated by multiple railroads until 1930, when all except the Pennsylvania Railroad dropped services and used Cleveland Union Terminal, which opened that year. The Pennsylvania Railroad continued to use the depot until 1953, and the building was demolished in 1959.

== Services ==
- Cleveland and Toledo Railroad (1853–1869)
- Cleveland, Columbus and Cincinnati Railroad (1853–1868)
- Cleveland, Painesville and Ashtabula Railroad / Lake Shore Railway (1853–1869)
- Cleveland and Pittsburgh Railroad (1853–1871)
- Cleveland, Columbus, Cincinnati and Indianapolis Railway (1868–1889)
- Lake Shore & Michigan Southern Railway (1869–1914)
- Pennsylvania Company (1871–1918)
- Cleveland, Cincinnati, Chicago and St. Louis Railway (1889–1930)
- New York Central (1914–1930)
- Pennsylvania Railroad (1918–1953)

== History ==
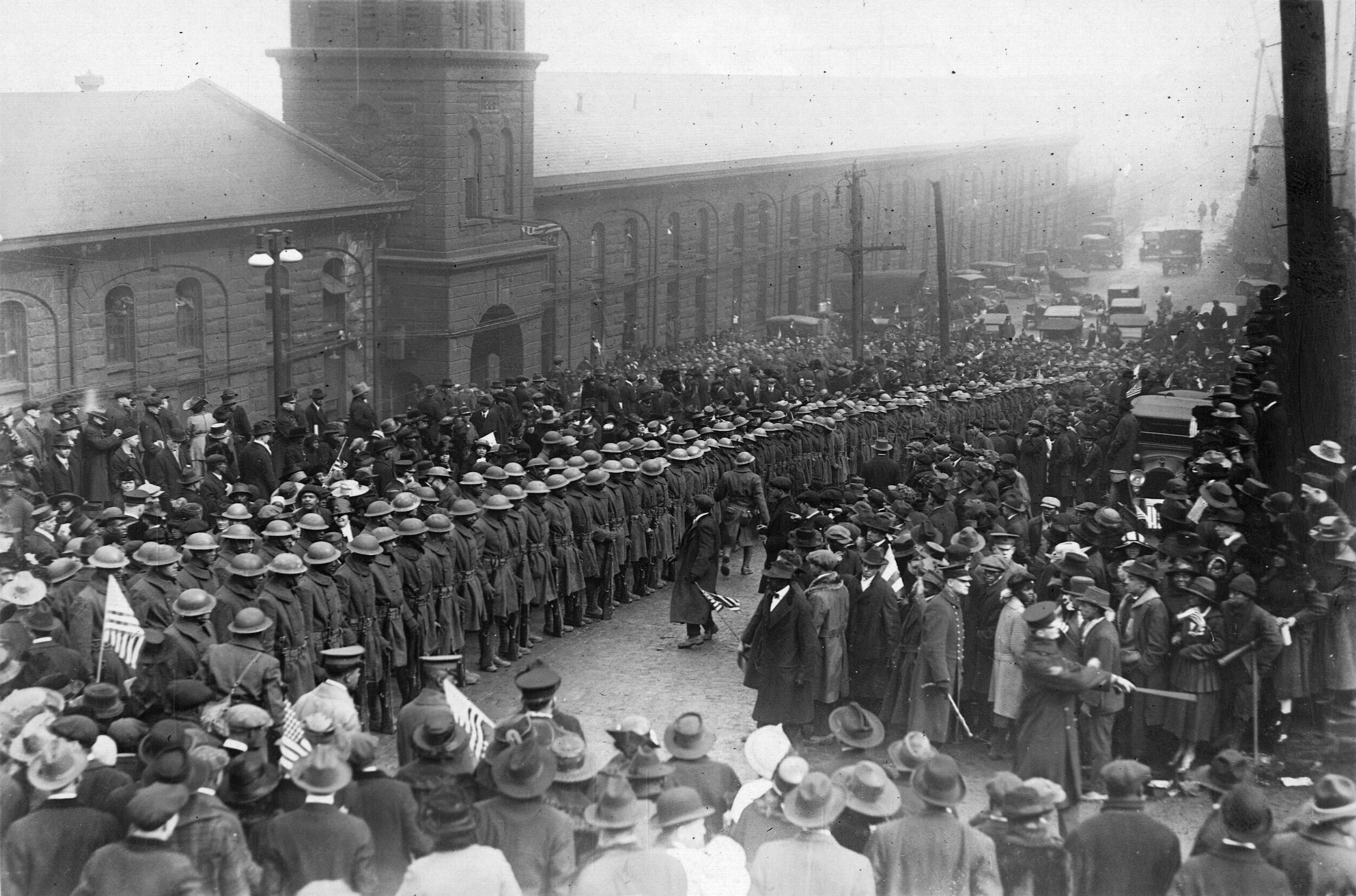
Demobilization of the 372nd Infantry Regiment returning from France after World War I, February 1919. Note the roof of the trainshed has been removed.

Before 1853, the railroads serving the city each maintained its own small depot. The first union depot cost $75,000 (equivalent to $2.9 million in 2025), and consisted of a group of wooden sheds centrally located at the foot of the hill where Bank (current-day West 6th) and Water (current-day West 9th) Streets met the lake shore. This depot was built from 1851 to 1853. The remaining structures were retained for housing, cleaning, and repairing train cars, and a replacement station was constructed of masonry nearby. It opened in 1866, with a final cost of $475,000 (equivalent to $10.4 million in 2025), and was dedicated on November 10 of that year. The opening was celebrated with a banquet for 300 in the station's dining hall. In 1867, the depot's tower was completed.

During the Civil War, the station was utilized to transport thousands of soldiers to training camps. Additionally, in December 1863, the Cleveland's Soldiers Aid Society constructed the Soldier's Home, a shelter and relief center offering food, clothing, shelter, and medical care to soldiers. U.S. President Abraham Lincoln used the terminal in departing Cleveland during his first inaugural tour throughout the country, on his way to Washington, D. C. After the war, the station was used to carry Lincoln's body on his funeral train to Springfield, Illinois.

By the 1890s, Union Depot was too small for the number of trains and people coming into Cleveland daily, and as it deteriorated and accumulated soot and ash, it became an embarrassment to many citizens. Plans for another depot, part of Cleveland's Group Plan, were begun, though they were not completed. In the mid-1900s, the depot was renovated, which included the removal of the arched train shed replaced by individual canopies over each platform.

The Van Sweringen brothers, owners of the Nickel Plate Railroad, persuaded the city and the other passenger railroads (except the Pennsylvania) to allow construction of a new train station as part of a retail and office complex at Public Square. This broke ground in 1922/23 and when Cleveland Union Terminal opened in 1930, Union Depot lost the bulk of its traffic. In 1946, it was renamed Pennsylvania Station. Only the Pennsylvania Railroad continued to use the old station until September 1953. The building was razed in 1959.

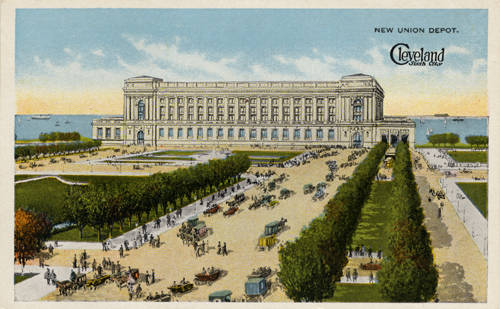
New Union Depot proposal as a part of the Group Plan, before a 1919 referendum on Cleveland Union Terminal

== Attributes ==
The station was constructed along Cleveland's lake front with Lake Erie, between modern-day 6th and 9th Streets, close to the current Amtrak station.

The 1866 depot was designed and constructed by industrialist and railroad director Amasa Stone. At the time of its construction, the building measured 603 by 180 feet (184 m × 55 m), making it the largest building under one roof, and the largest train station, in the United States. It retained those records until Grand Central Depot was built in New York City in 1871. Thereafter, it retained recognition as the largest terminal west of New York City. It was also among the first buildings to use structural iron; it had Berea Sandstone exterior walls. Its most iconic feature was a 96-foot clock tower on the south facade, topped with a tin-covered dome.

== See also ==
- List of historical passenger rail services in Cleveland
