= Irvington Road station =

Trolley station in Pennsylvania, United States

Irvington Rd
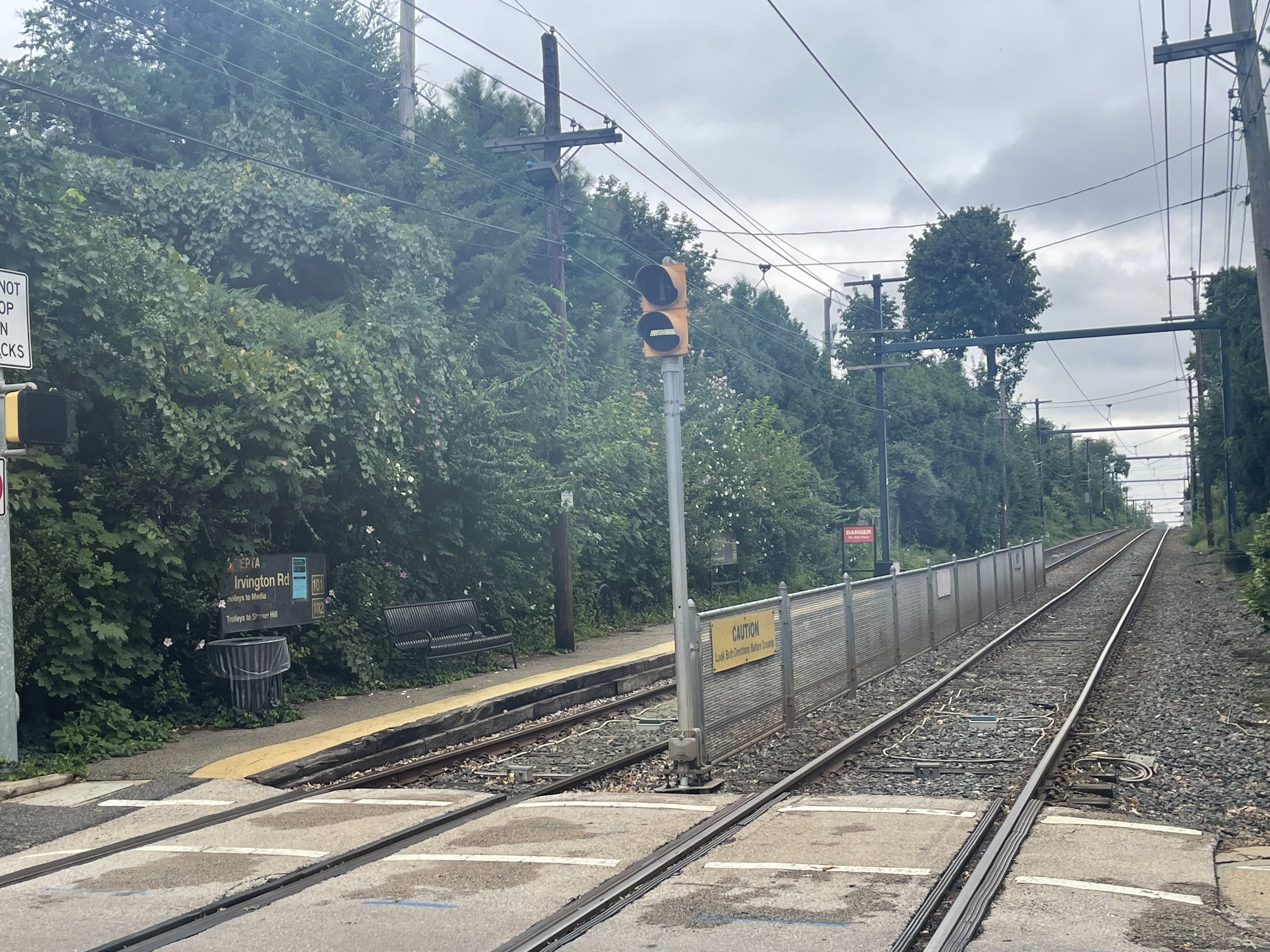
- Irvington Road station

General information
- Location: Near Irvington & Hillcrest Roads; Drexel Hill, PA
- Coordinates: 39.9489°N 75.2889°W
- Owner: SEPTA
- Platforms: 2 side platforms
- Tracks: 2

Construction
- Structure type: None
- Parking: No
- Accessible: No

History
- Electrified: Overhead lines

Services
Preceding station	SEPTA Metro	Following station
Drexel Hill Junction toward Orange Street/Media	D (SEPTA Metro)	Drexel Park toward 69th Street T.C.
Drexel Hill Junction toward Chester Pike/Sharon Hill	D (SEPTA Metro)	Drexel Park toward 69th Street T.C.
Location

Irvington Road station is a SEPTA Metro D stop in Drexel Hill, Pennsylvania. It is officially located near Irvington and Hillcrest Roads, but in reality it is nearly halfway between Hillcrest and Garrett Roads on Irvington Road. It serves both the D1 and D2, and only local service is provided on both lines. Irvington Road is the next to last stop where the D1 and D2 share the same right of way.

Trolleys arriving at this station travel between 69th Street Transit Center in Upper Darby and either Orange Street in Media for the D1, or Sharon Hill for the D2 line. The station provides platforms with a bench, but no shelters, unlike the nearby Drexel Hill Junction station. Because the stop is in a residential area, there is no parking available.
