= Scenic Road station =

Light-rail station in Pennsylvania, US

Scenic Rd
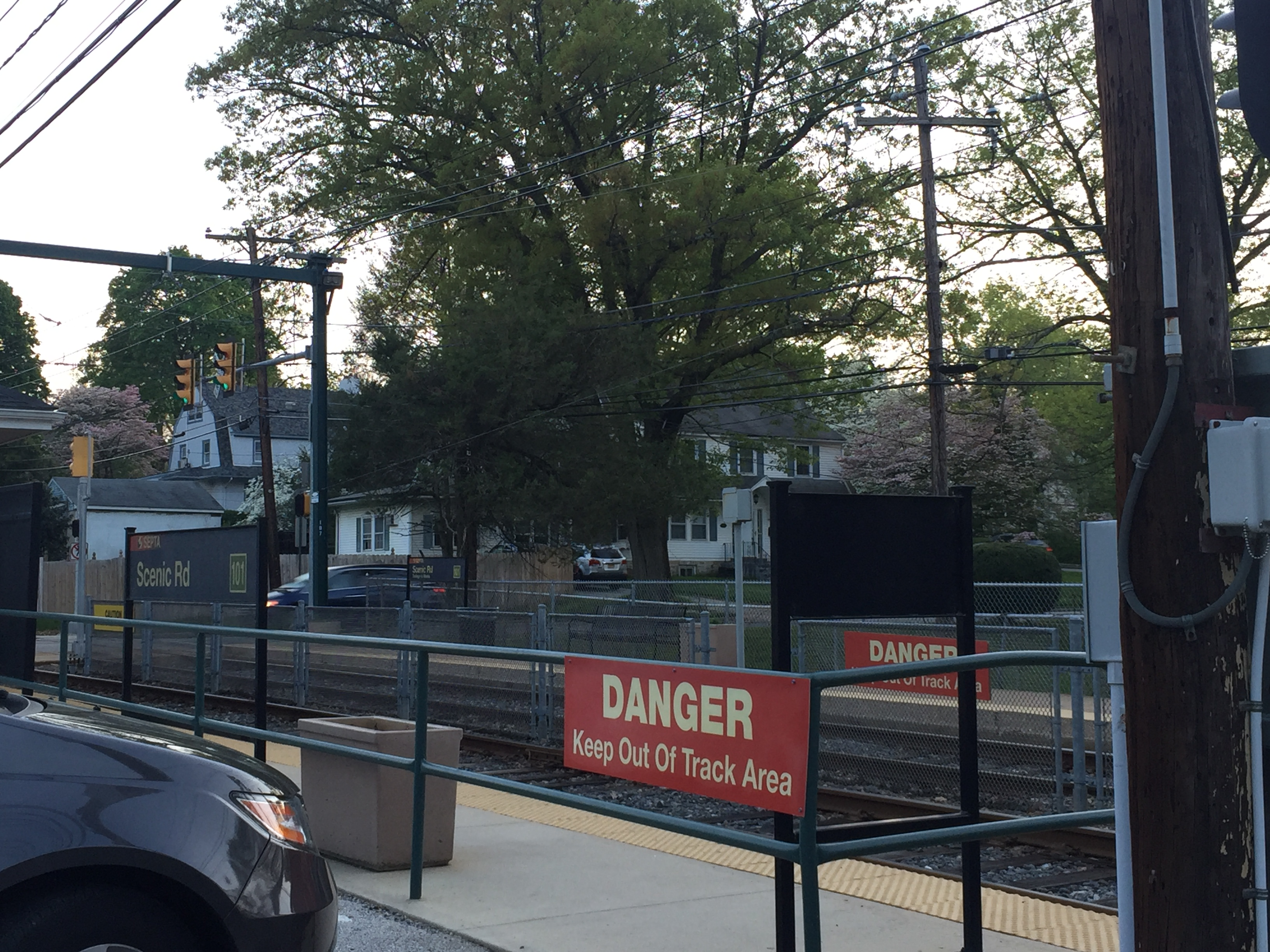

General information
- Location: Scenic Road near Rolling Road; Springfield, Pennsylvania
- Coordinates: 39.9408°N 75.3260°W
- Owner: SEPTA
- Platforms: 2 side platforms
- Tracks: 2

Construction
- Parking: Yes
- Accessible: No

History
- Electrified: Overhead lines

Services
Preceding station	SEPTA Metro	Following station
Brookside–Springfield toward Orange Street/Media	D (SEPTA Metro)	Drexeline toward 69th Street T.C.
Location

Scenic Road station is a stop on the D in Springfield Township, Delaware County, Pennsylvania. It is officially located near Scenic and Rolling Roads.

Trolleys arriving at this station travel between 69th Street Transit Center in Upper Darby Township, Pennsylvania and Orange Street in Media, Pennsylvania. The station has a shed with a roof where people can go inside when it is raining. Free parking is available at this station. Scenic Road is at the north end of Walsh Park, a 19.4-acre (79,000 m^{2}) natural environmental center with picnic tables, playground equipment, and various athletic fields. It is also located south of Indian Rock Park, a 21.9-acre (89,000 m^{2}) natural environmental park in Drexel Hill, containing picnic tables, playground equipment, basketball courts, and Darby Creek.
