= Aronimink station =

Aronimink
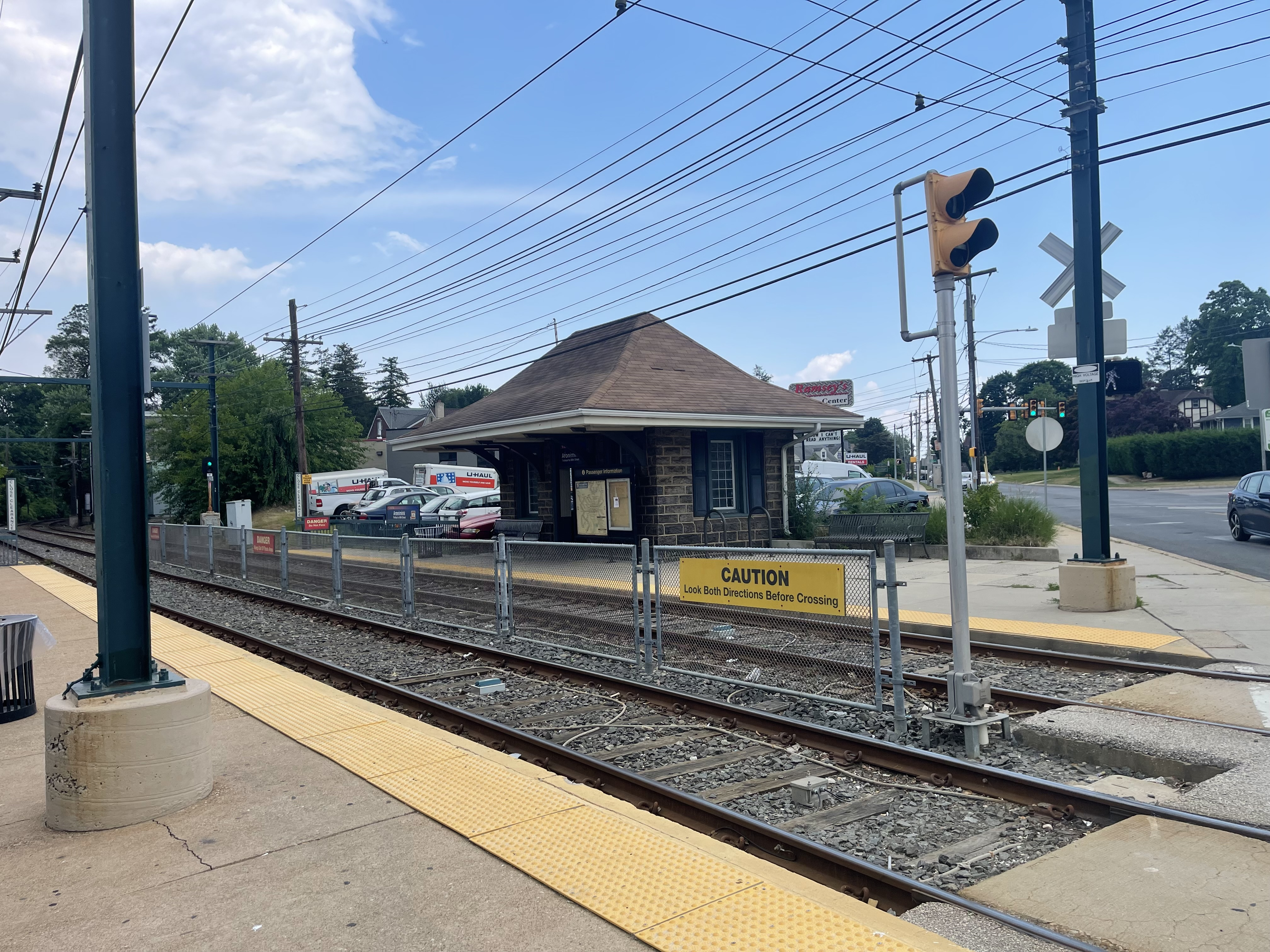

General information
- Location: Burmont Road & Morgan Avenue; Drexel Hill, Pennsylvania.
- Coordinates: 39.9493°N 75.3061°W
- Owner: SEPTA
- Platforms: 2 side platforms
- Tracks: 2

Construction
- Parking: No
- Accessible: No

History
- Electrified: Overhead lines

Services
Preceding station	SEPTA Metro	Following station
Anderson Avenue toward Orange Street/Media	D (SEPTA Metro)	School Lane toward 69th Street T.C.
Location

Aronimink station is stop on the D in the Aronimink section of Drexel Hill, Pennsylvania. It is located on Burmont Road & Morgan Avenue, although SEPTA gives the address as being near that intersection. Aronimink is the only stop of the Media Line that crosses Burmont Road.

Trolleys arriving at this station travel between 69th Street Transit Center in Upper Darby Township, Pennsylvania and Orange Street in Media, Pennsylvania. The station has a shed with a roof where people can go inside when it is raining. The shelter is the standard P&W "Red Arrow" stone shelter, similar to that of the Providence Road/Media station in Media, and the Woodland Avenue station in Springfield. Free parking is not available at this stop, and all parking lots within the vicinity are the property of local businesses, including that of a local branch of the U.S. Post Office.

The Aronimink station is located in the same intersection as the former location of the Waverly Theatre in downtown Drexel Hill. The movie theater was a long-standing hub of the town, celebrated for its $1 movies through the mid-1980s, and is now the home of Hanrahan's Irish Pub.
