= Providence Road station =

Providence Road station may refer to:

- Providence Road/Media station, Media, Pennsylvania
- Woodlawn–Providence station, Alden, Pennsylvania

== See also ==
- Providence Road
