= Anderson Avenue =

Anderson Avenue may refer to:

- Anderson Avenue (Hudson Palisades), north–south avenue which is the major commercial district for Fairview, Cliffside Park, and Fort Lee in New Jersey
- Anderson Avenue (SEPTA Route 101 station), stop along the SEPTA Media (Route 101) trolley line in the Aronimink section of Drexel Hill, Pennsylvania
- Anderson–Jerome Avenues (IRT Ninth Avenue Line), station on the abandoned section of the IRT Ninth Avenue Line in NYC
