= Huey Avenue station =

Trolley stop in Drexel Hill, Pennsylvania, US

Huey Av
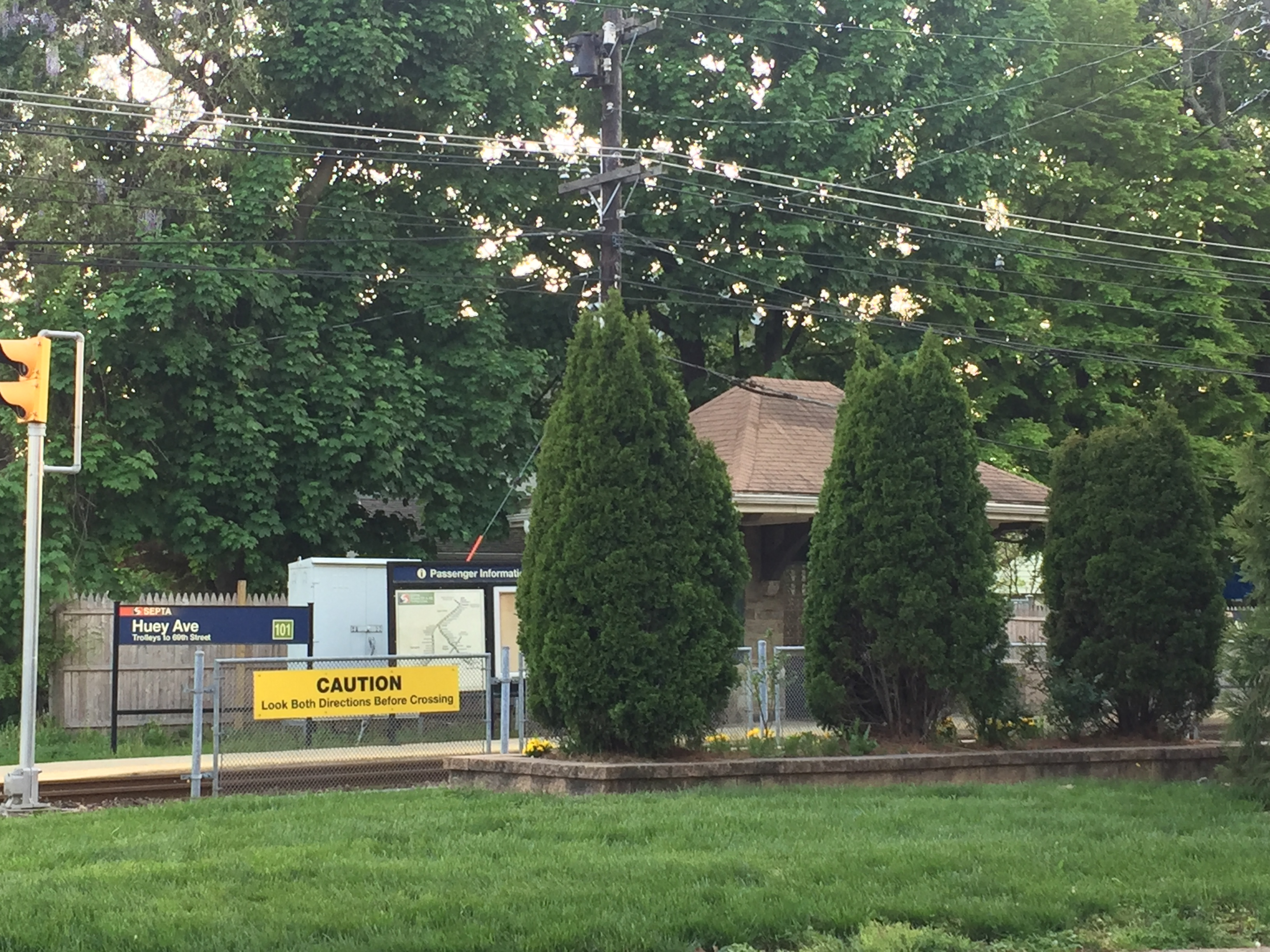
- Huey Avenue station in 2017

General information
- Location: Huey & Edmonds Avenues; Drexel Hill, Pennsylvania.
- Coordinates: 39.9476°N 75.2978°W
- Owner: SEPTA
- Platforms: 2 side platforms
- Tracks: 2

Construction
- Structure type: Stone
- Parking: No
- Accessible: No

History
- Electrified: Overhead lines

Services
Preceding station	SEPTA Metro	Following station
School Lane toward Orange Street/Media	D (SEPTA Metro)	Drexel Hill Junction toward 69th Street T.C.
Location

Huey Avenue station is a stop on the D in Drexel Hill, Pennsylvania. It is officially located near Huey and Edmonds Avenues in Drexel Hill, but in reality is closer to the intersection of Huey Avenue and Mason Avenue.

Trolleys arriving at this station travel between 69th Street Transit Center in Upper Darby Township, Pennsylvania, and Orange Street in Media, Pennsylvania. The station has a P&W-era stone shed with a roof where people can go inside when it is raining on the northwest corner of the grade crossing. On the opposite side of this shelter is an ordinary bench. Huey Avenue is the first/last stop along the D1 that doesn't share a right-of-way with the D2 to Sharon Hill, Pennsylvania.
