= Beatty Road station =

Beatty Rd
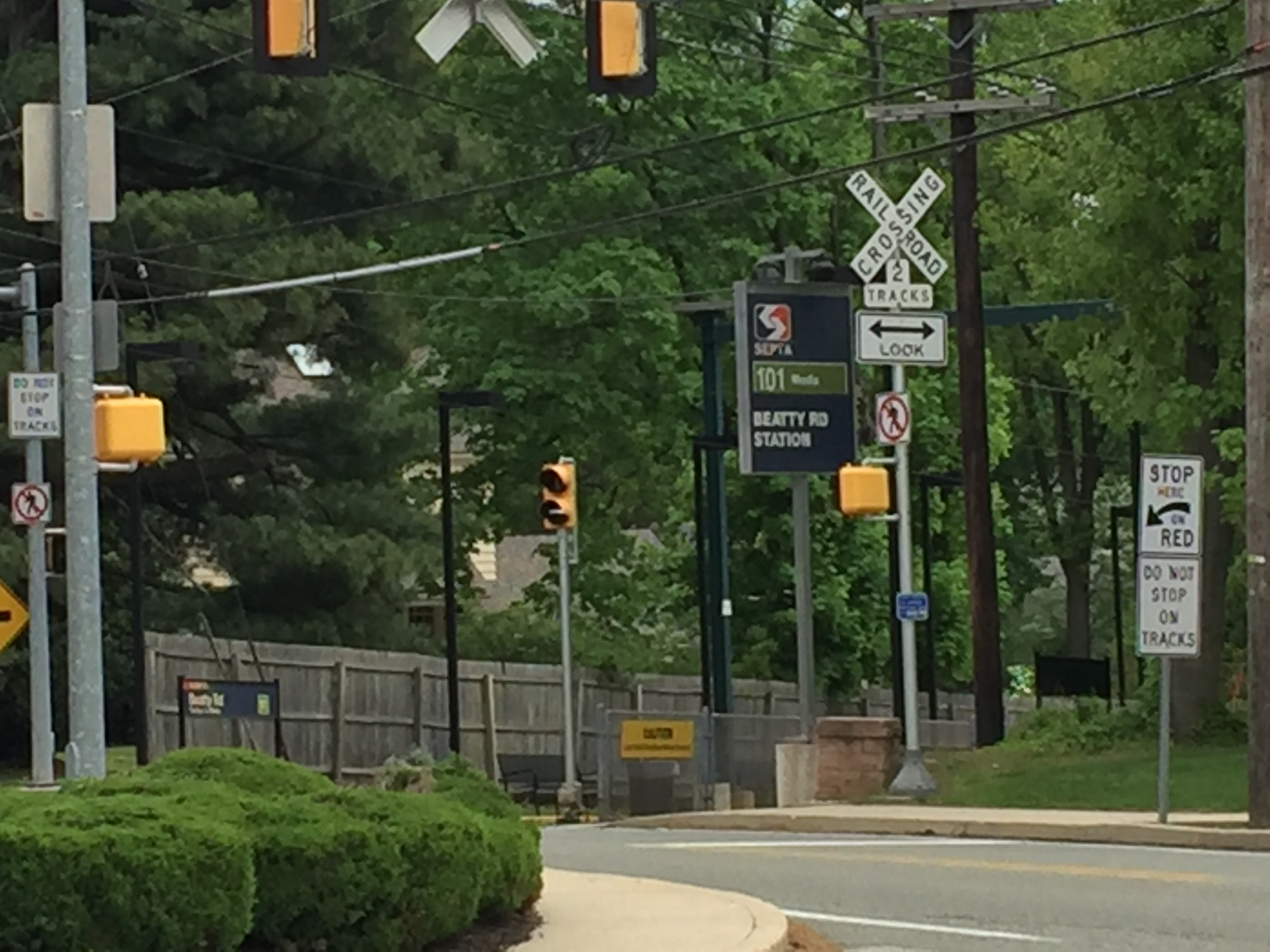

General information
- Location: Beatty Road & Surrey Road; Media, Pennsylvania.
- Coordinates: 39.9162°N 75.3769°W
- Owner: SEPTA
- Platforms: 2 side platforms
- Tracks: 2

Construction
- Structure type: Open plexiglass shelter
- Parking: No
- Accessible: No

History
- Electrified: Overhead lines

Services
Preceding station	SEPTA Metro	Following station
Providence Road/Media toward Orange Street/Media	D (SEPTA Metro)	Pine Ridge toward 69th Street T.C.
Location

Beatty Road station is a stop on the D in Media, Pennsylvania. It is officially located on Beatty Road and Surrey Road, although the intersection of Beatty Road and Court House Road is much closer.

Trolleys arriving at this station travel between 69th Street Transit Center in Upper Darby Township, Pennsylvania and Orange Street in Downtown Media. The station has an open acrylic glass bus-stop like shed on the southeast corner of the railroad crossing. While no parking is officially available at this station, a parking lot across from the intersection of Beatty & Court House Roads exists for a shopping center along Baltimore Pike between North Providence and Beatty Roads. Beatty Road is the westernmost station on the D1 that contains two tracks.
