= Drexel Park station =

Drexel Park
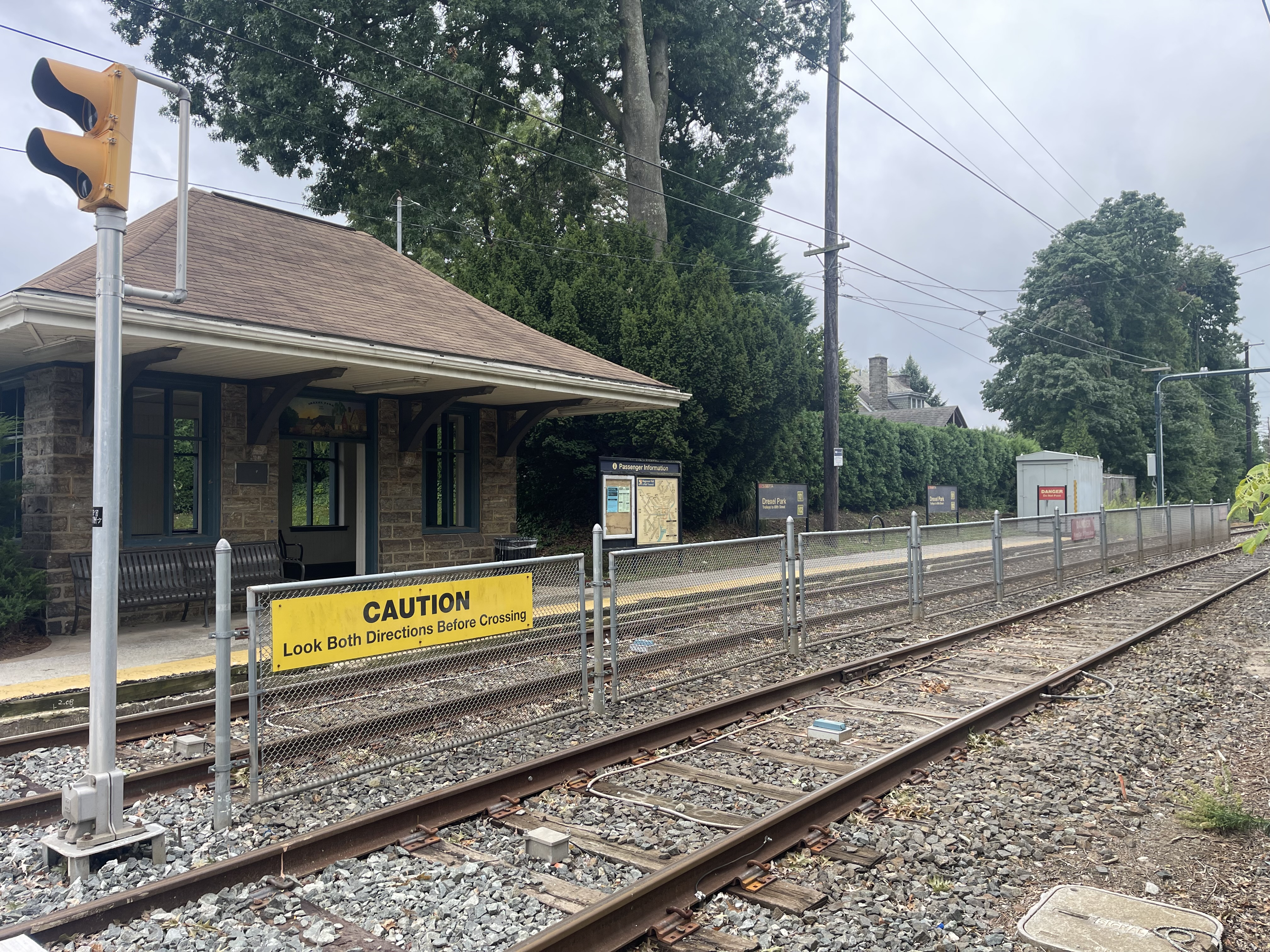

General information
- Location: Near Fairfax & Hillcrest Roads; Drexel Hill, PA
- Coordinates: 39.9497°N 75.2870°W
- Owner: SEPTA
- Platforms: 2 side platforms
- Tracks: 2

Construction
- Parking: No
- Accessible: No

History
- Electrified: Overhead lines

Services
Preceding station	SEPTA Metro	Following station
Irvington Road toward Orange Street/Media	D (SEPTA Metro)	Lansdowne Avenue toward 69th Street T.C.
Irvington Road toward Chester Pike/Sharon Hill	D (SEPTA Metro)	Lansdowne Avenue toward 69th Street T.C.
Location

Drexel Park station (also known as Fairfax Road) is a SEPTA Metro D stop in Drexel Hill, Pennsylvania. It is located on Fairfax Road between Hillcrest and Garrett Roads and serves both the D1 and D2. Only local service is provided on both lines.

Trolleys arriving at this station travel between 69th Street Transit Center in Upper Darby Township, Pennsylvania and either Orange Street in Media, Pennsylvania for the D1, or Sharon Hill, Pennsylvania for the D2. Despite the name, the closest thing to a park at this stop is located further north at Arlington Cemetery of Drexel Hill. Because the stop is in a residential area, there is no parking available.

This community was named as one of the top ten neighborhoods in the Philadelphia area by PhillyMag.com.
