= School Lane station =

School Ln
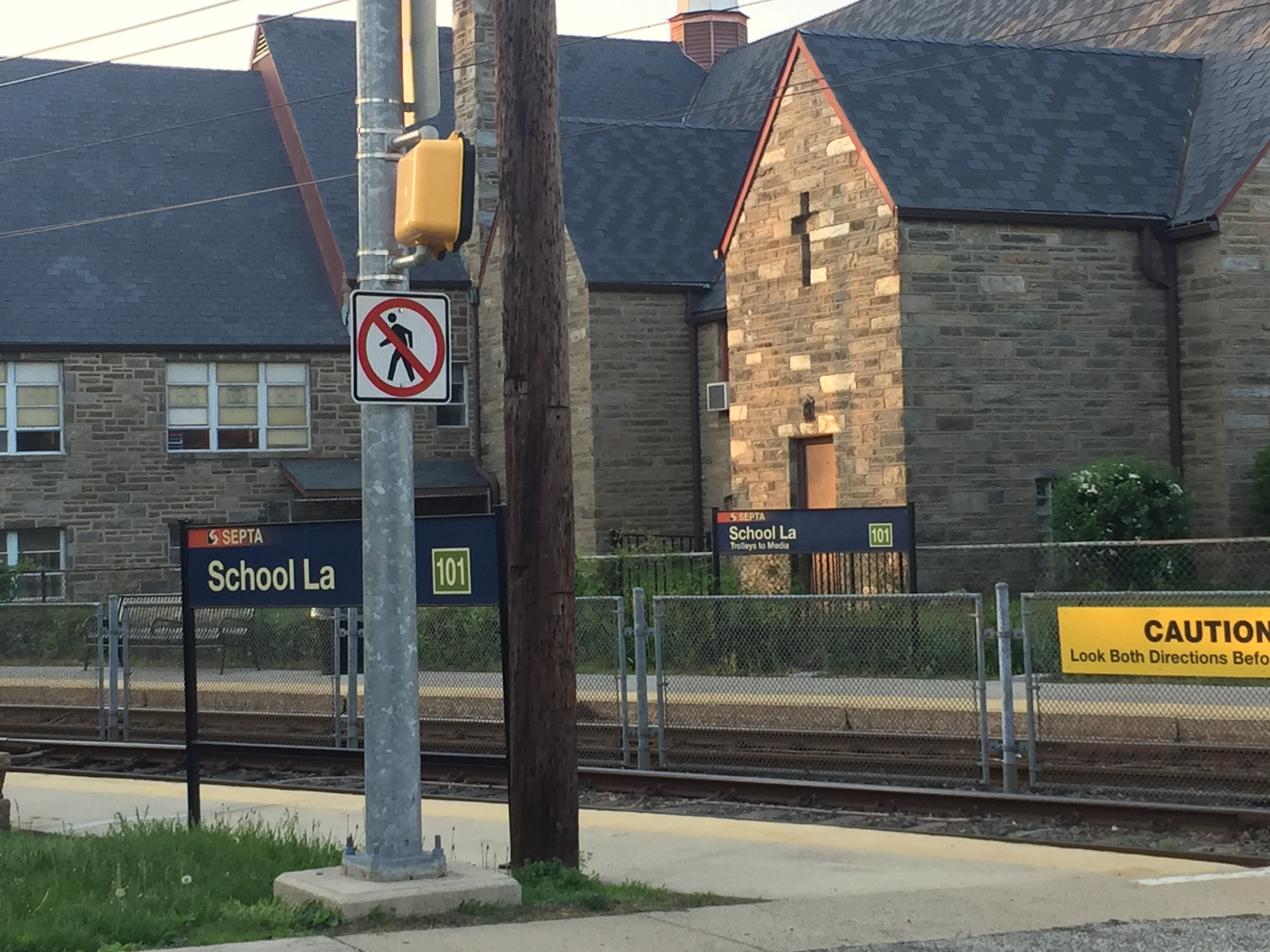
- School Lane station in 2017

General information
- Location: School Lane west of Edmonds Avenue; Drexel Hill, Pennsylvania.
- Coordinates: 39.9487°N 75.2999°W
- Owner: SEPTA
- Platforms: 2 side platforms
- Tracks: 2

Construction
- Structure type: Open stone shed
- Parking: No
- Accessible: No

History
- Electrified: Overhead lines

Services
Preceding station	SEPTA Metro	Following station
Aronimink toward Orange Street/Media	D (SEPTA Metro)	Huey Avenue toward 69th Street T.C.
Location

School Lane station is a station on the D in Drexel Hill, Pennsylvania. It is located on School Lane west of Edmonds Avenue. The station is next to Grace Lutheran Church on the northwest corner of the aforementioned intersection.

Trolleys arriving at this station travel between 69th Street Transit Center in Upper Darby Township, Pennsylvania, and Orange Street in Media, Pennsylvania. The station features a P&W-era shed with a roof in which passengers can wait during inclement weather. The shed is made of stucco similar to that of the nearby Aronimink station. An actual school can be found one block east of this intersection. No parking is available at this stop, as it is located in a residential area.
