= Drexelbrook station =

Drexelbrook
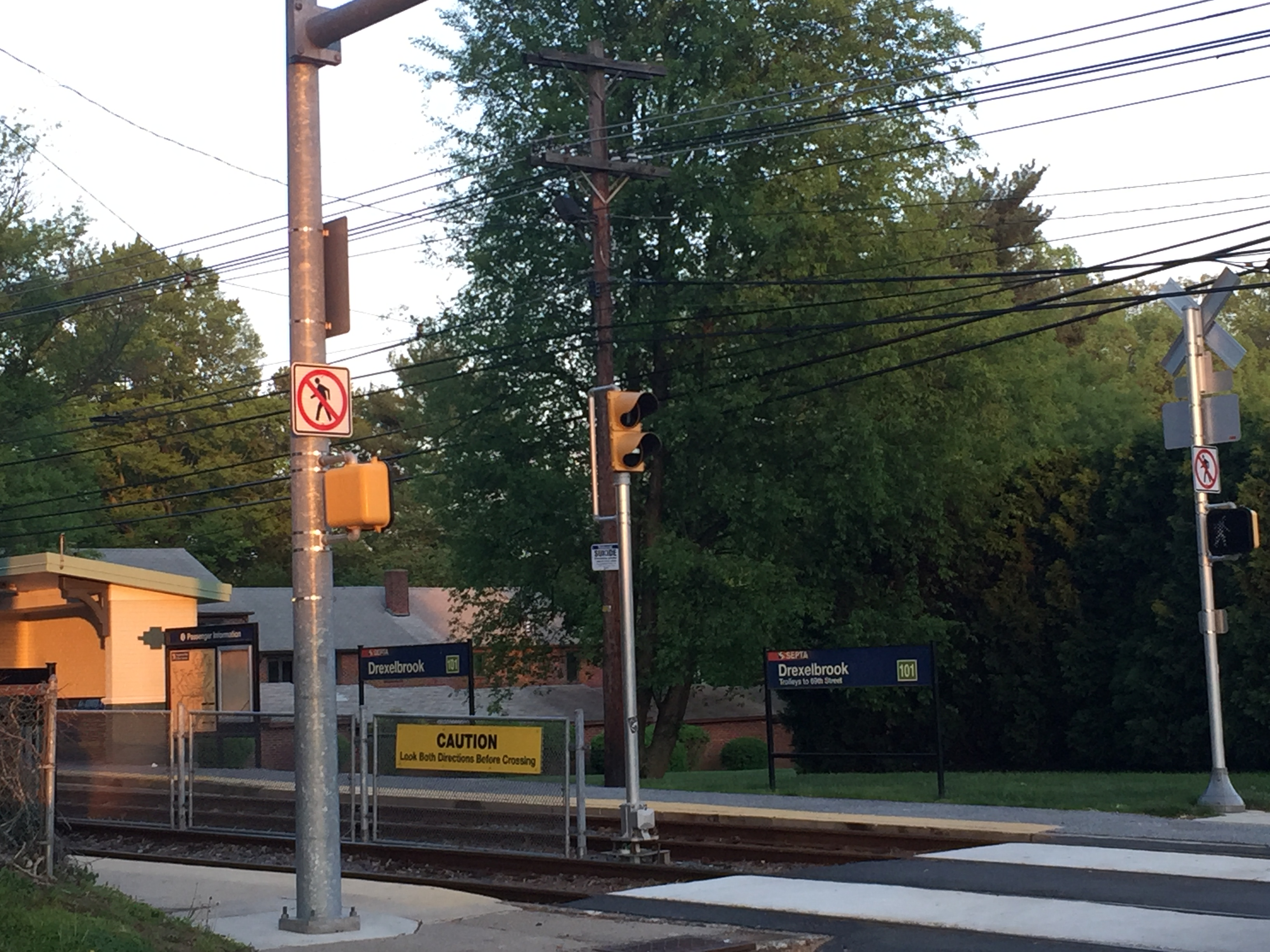

General information
- Location: Wildell Road south of Woodland Avenue; Drexel Hill, Pennsylvania
- Coordinates: 39.9472°N 75.3160°W
- Owner: SEPTA
- Platforms: 2 side platforms
- Tracks: 2

Construction
- Parking: No
- Accessible: No

History
- Electrified: Overhead lines

Services
Preceding station	SEPTA Metro	Following station
Drexeline toward Orange Street/Media	D (SEPTA Metro)	Anderson Avenue toward 69th Street T.C.
Location

Drexelbrook station is a stop on the D in Drexel Hill, Pennsylvania, United States. It is officially located near Stanbridge Road and Woodland Avenue in the Drexelbrook area, however the actual grade crossing and platforms are on Wildell Road south of Woodland Avenue and north of Revere Road and Drexelbrook Drive.

Trolleys arriving at this station travel between 69th Street Transit Center in Upper Darby Township, Pennsylvania and Orange Street in Media, Pennsylvania. The station has a shed with a roof where people can go inside when it is raining on one platform and a bench on the other. Platforms exist on both sides of the tracks, along the northeast and southeast corners of the grade crossing. No parking is available at this station.
