= Pine Ridge station =

Pine Ridge
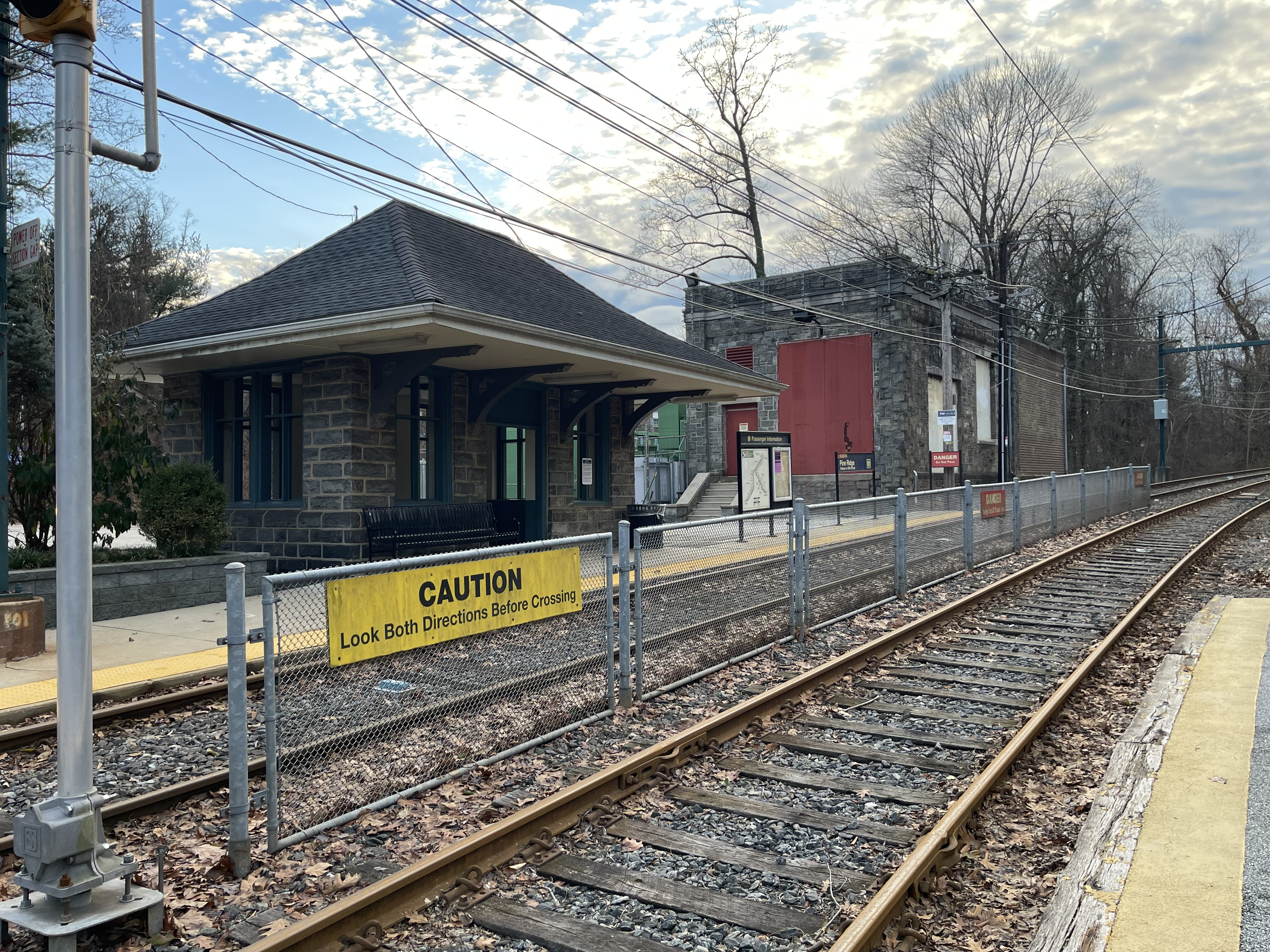
- Pine Ridge station

General information
- Location: Near Pine Ridge Road & Beechwood Road; Springfield, Pennsylvania
- Coordinates: 39.9150°N 75.3700°W
- Owner: SEPTA
- Platforms: 2 side platforms
- Tracks: 2

Construction
- Structure type: Open brick shelter
- Parking: Yes
- Accessible: No

History
- Electrified: Overhead lines

Services
Preceding station	SEPTA Metro	Following station
Beatty Road toward Orange Street/Media	D (SEPTA Metro)	Paper Mill Road toward 69th Street T.C.
Location

Pine Ridge station is a stop on the D in Springfield Township, Delaware County, Pennsylvania. It is officially located at Pine Ridge Drive and Beechwood Road, however the intersection with Beechwood Road lies north of the station.

Trolleys arriving at this station travel between 69th Street Transit Center in Upper Darby Township, Pennsylvania and Orange Street in Media, Pennsylvania. The station has a shed with a roof where people can go inside when it is raining. It also has metered parking and a power station next to the shed. East of this station, the D1 narrows down from two tracks to one as it enters Smedley County Park and goes back to two tracks east of PA Route 420. Additionally, the station serves as the Smedley Park - Pine Ridge Run / Penza Tract Trailhead.
