= Drexel Hill Junction station =

Drexel Hill Junction
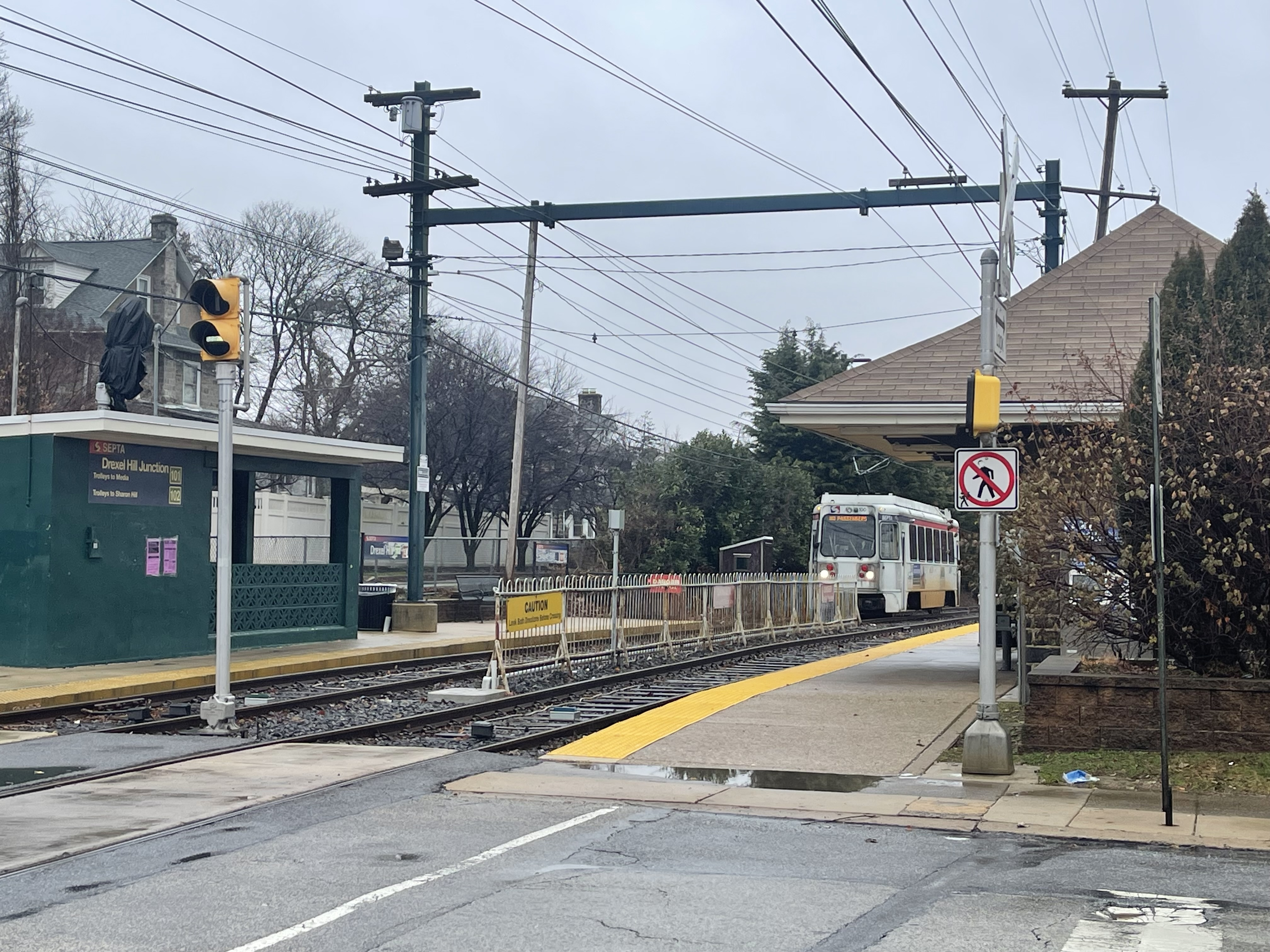
- Drexel Hill Junction station

General information
- Location: Hillcrest Road & Shadeland Avenue; Drexel Hill, PA
- Coordinates: 39.9471°N 75.2926°W
- Owner: SEPTA
- Platforms: 2 side platforms
- Tracks: 2
- Connections: SEPTA Suburban Bus: 107

Construction
- Structure type: Three sheds
- Parking: No
- Accessible: No

History
- Electrified: Overhead lines

Services
Preceding station	SEPTA Metro	Following station
Huey Avenue toward Orange Street/Media	D (SEPTA Metro)	Irvington Road toward 69th Street T.C.
Garrettford toward Chester Pike/Sharon Hill	D (SEPTA Metro)	Irvington Road toward 69th Street T.C.
Location

Drexel Hill Junction (also known as Shadeland Avenue) is a SEPTA Metro D station in Drexel Hill, Pennsylvania. It is located near Hillcrest Road and Shadeland Avenue, and serves both the D1 and D2. Drexel Hill Junction is the last stop where the D1 and D2 share the same right-of-way.

Trolleys arriving at this station travel between 69th Street Transit Center in Upper Darby Township, Pennsylvania and either Orange Street in Media, Pennsylvania for the D1, or Sharon Hill, Pennsylvania for the D2. The station has 2 covered sheds where people can go inside when it is raining. It serves as a stop for both local and express lines. The tracks split between Shadeland and Turner Avenues. A storage track exists between the wye that terminates across from the intersection of Turner and Berry Avenues. No parking is available at this station, and bus connections are limited.

The sheds include an original Red Arrow Lines-era stone shelter on the southeast corner of Shadeland Avenue with a heavy gabled roof and green window frames with no glass. The shelter on the northeast corner of Shadeland Avenue is a square green stucco shelter with both an enclosed and open area, and an angled-roof tilting slightly down towards Hillcrest Road.
