= Drexeline station =

Drexeline
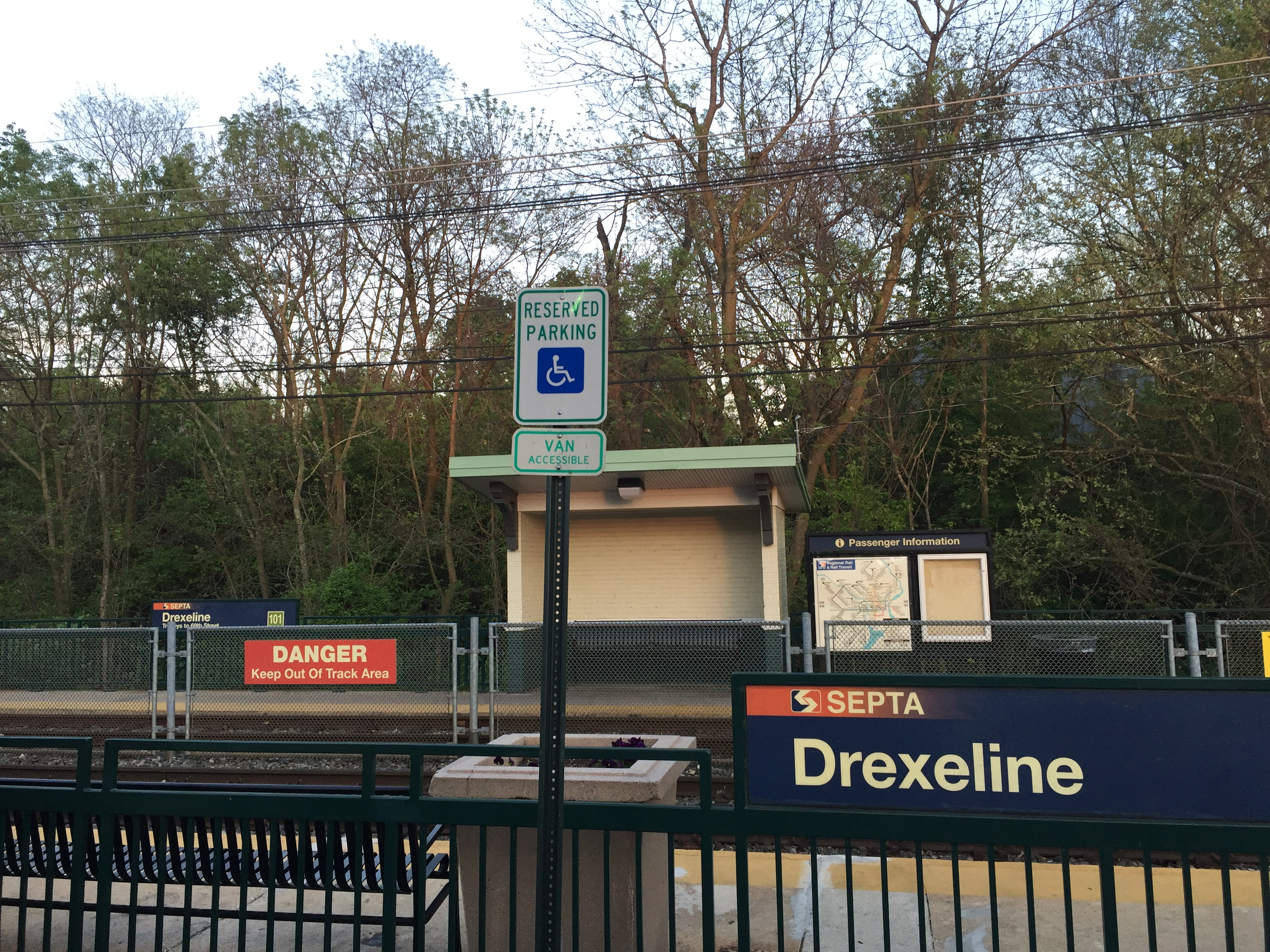

General information
- Location: Woodland Avenue behind Drexeline Shopping Center; Drexel Hill, Pennsylvania.
- Coordinates: 39.9448°N 75.3215°W
- Owner: SEPTA
- Platforms: 2 side platforms
- Tracks: 2

Construction
- Parking: Yes
- Accessible: No

History
- Electrified: Overhead lines

Services
Preceding station	SEPTA Metro	Following station
Scenic Road toward Orange Street/Media	D (SEPTA Metro)	Drexelbrook toward 69th Street T.C.
Location

Drexeline station is a stop on the D in Drexel Hill, Pennsylvania. It is located near Woodland Avenue behind Drexeline Shopping Center in the Drexelbrook area. It is also located northeast of a bridge over Darby Creek near Indian Rock Park, a 21.9-acre (89,000 m^{2}) Natural Environmental Park, containing picnic tables, playground equipment, and basketball courts. Drexeline is the closest stop on the entire Media-Sharon Hill trolley line system to US 1.

Trolleys arriving at this station travel between 69th Street Transit Center in Upper Darby Township, Pennsylvania and Orange Street in Media, Pennsylvania. Free parking is available at this station, although it is primarily designed for patrons of the shopping center. Until the Springfield Mall opened in 1974, Drexeline was the only stop along the Media line that served a shopping plaza of any kind. Today at least four stops serve shopping centers, and two of them serve the same one in Media.
