= Anderson Avenue station =

Anderson Av
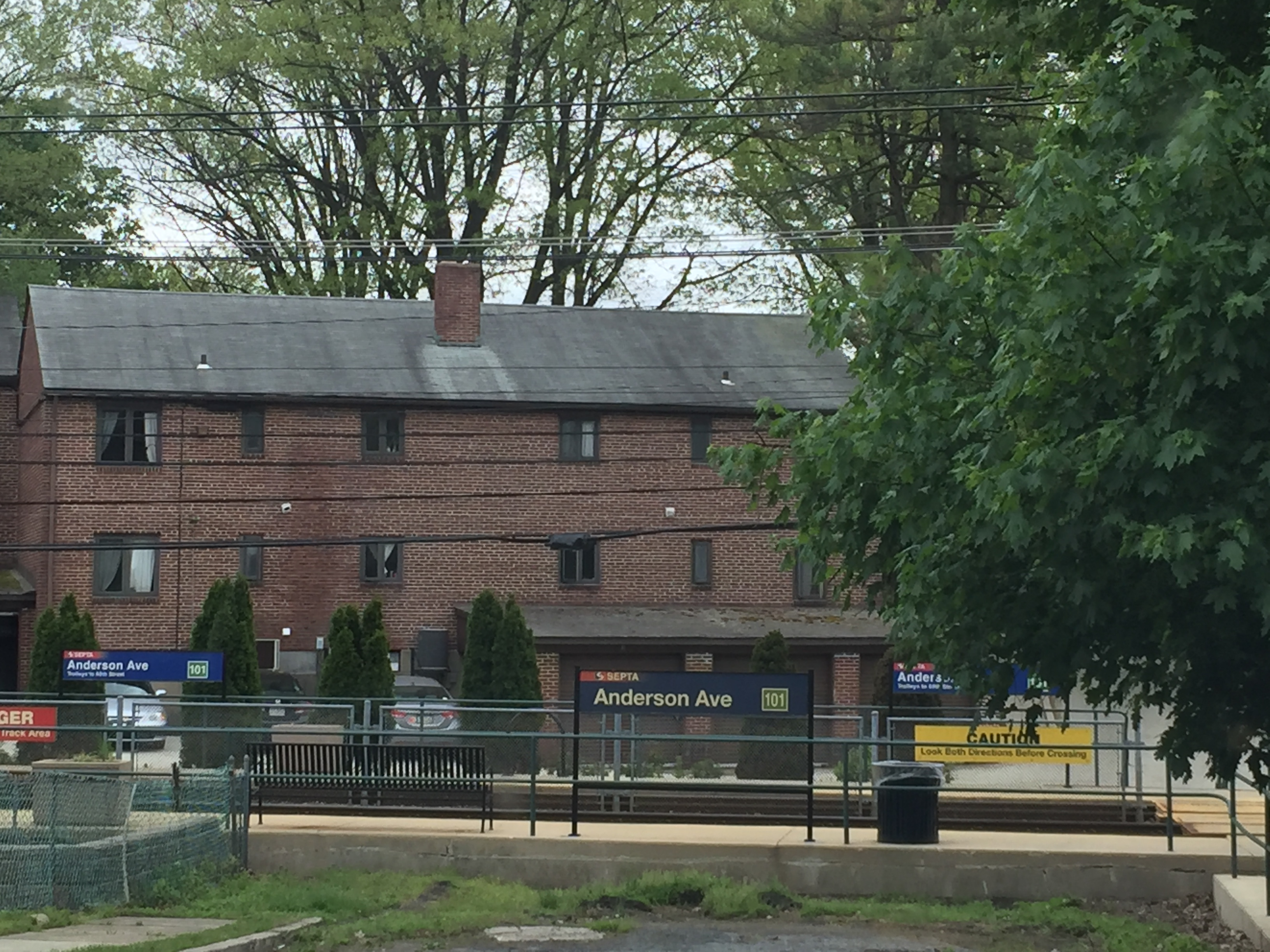

General information
- Location: Anderson Avenue near Woodland Avenue; Drexel Hill, Pennsylvania.
- Coordinates: 39.9478°N 75.3129°W
- Owner: SEPTA
- Platforms: 2 side platforms
- Tracks: 2

Construction
- Structure type: Open stucco shed
- Accessible: No

History
- Electrified: Overhead lines

Services
Preceding station	SEPTA Metro	Following station
Drexelbrook toward Orange Street/Media	D (SEPTA Metro)	Aronimink toward 69th Street T.C.
Location

Anderson Avenue station is a stop on the D in Drexel Hill, Pennsylvania. It is officially located near Anderson & Woodland Avenues, though the actual location is on Anderson Avenue south of Woodland Avenue.

Trolleys arriving at this station travel between 69th Street Transit Center in Upper Darby Township, Pennsylvania and Orange Street in Media, Pennsylvania. Anderson Avenue is a dead end street at this station which contains platforms on both sides of the tracks. The other platform is located across the tracks behind the parking lot of a group of condominiums on Valley Road. The station has a white and green stucco shed with a roof where people can go inside when it is raining, but it is on the side with the condominiums.
