= Collen Brook Farm =

Historic house in Pennsylvania, United States

- U.S. National Register of Historic Places
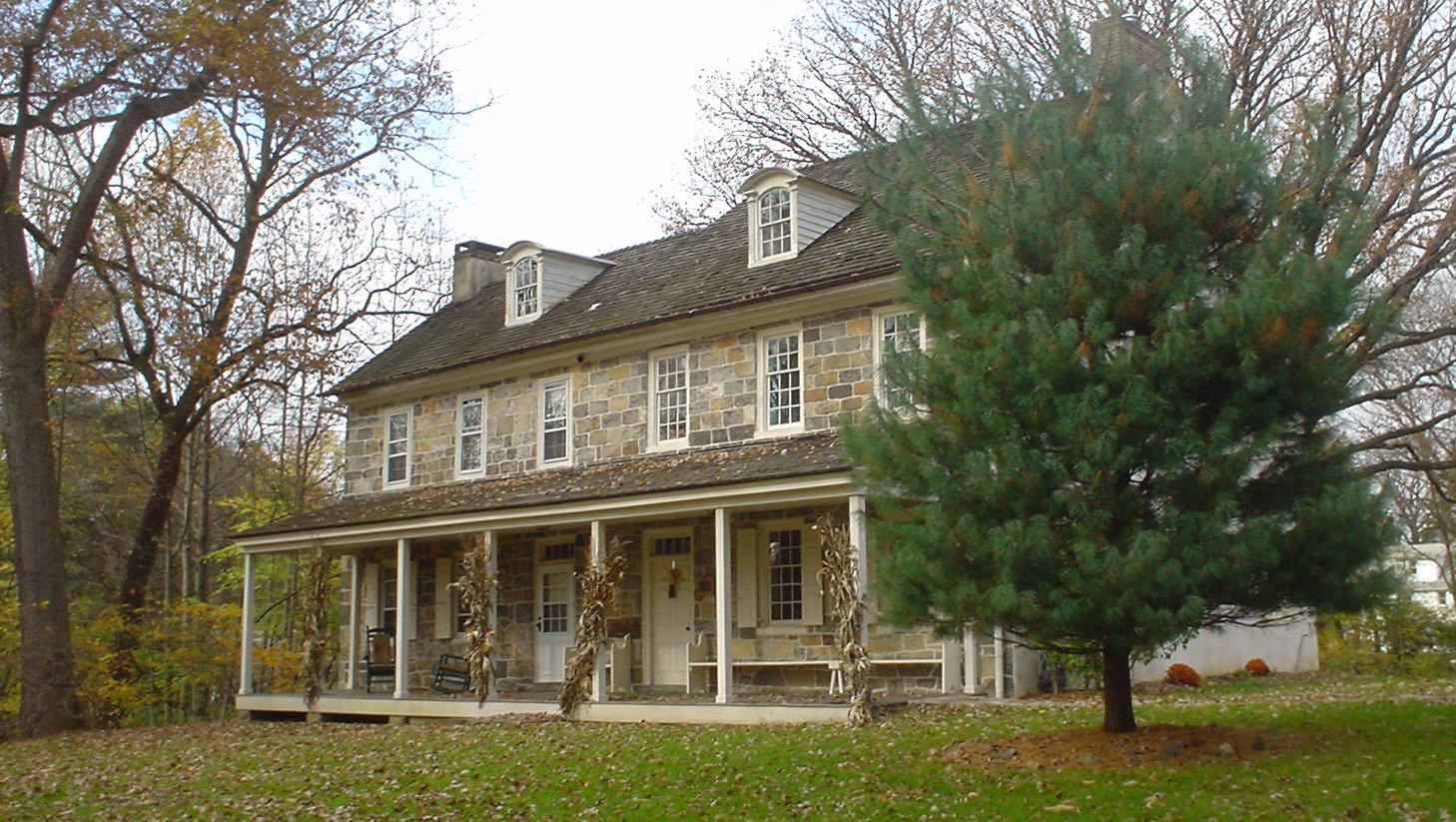
- Collenbrook Farm, November 2009

- Location within Pennsylvania Location within the United States
- Location: Off Mansion and Marvine Rds., Upper Darby Township, Pennsylvania
- Coordinates: 39°57′5″N 75°19′16″W
- Area: 4.9 acres (2.0 ha)
- Built: c. 1700 – c. 1870
- Built by: Mordecai Lawrence
- Architectural style: Colonial, Georgian Center Hall Plan
- NRHP reference No.: 88003048
- Added to NRHP: December 22, 1988

Collen Brook Farm, also known as Collenbrook, is a historic home and associated buildings located in Upper Darby Township, Delaware County, Pennsylvania. The complex includes three contributing buildings: a farmhouse, a granite spring house (c. 1782), and stone and frame carriage house (c. 1870). The house is a 2 1/2-story, vernacular stone residence with a Georgian plan and consisting of three sections. The oldest section was built around 1700, with additions made in 1774, and 1794.

It was the home of noted educator and 19th-century political leader George Smith. Later, Ludlow Ogden Smith, the first husband of Katharine Hepburn, resided here. It was added to the National Register of Historic Places in 1988. In the early 1990's, the Smith family intended to turn the house into the "Smith-Lewis Local History Museum," with support from Hepburn.

The 18th-century period farmhouse house is now owned by Upper Darby Township, operated by the Upper Darby Historical Society. and open to the public on Sunday afternoons from May through October.
