= Drexel Hill, Pennsylvania =

Neighborhood in Pennsylvania, US

- Neighborhood
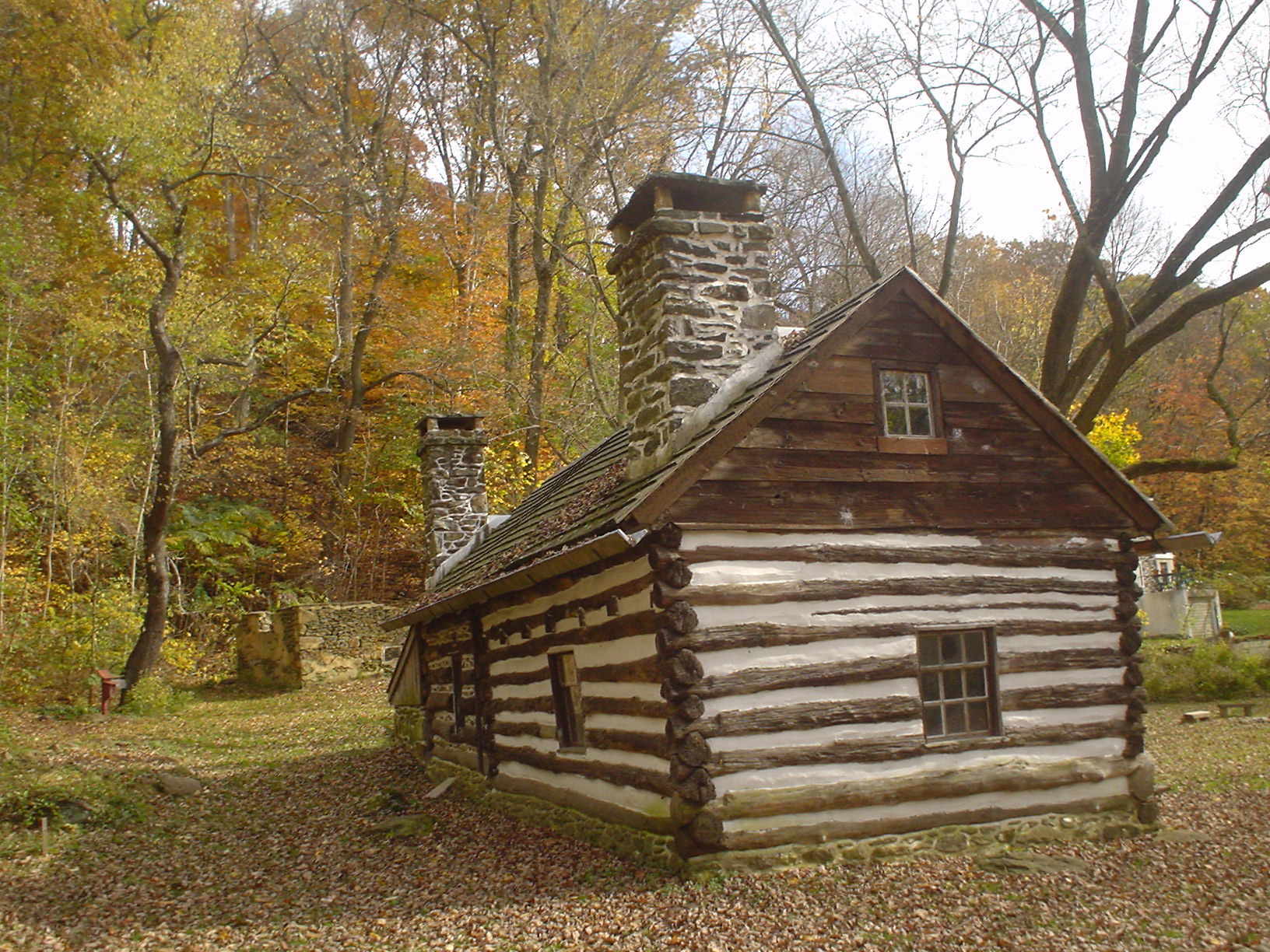
- The Lower Swedish Cabin in Drexel Hill

- Location in Delaware County and the U.S. state of Pennsylvania
- Coordinates: 39°57′00″N 75°18′07″W
- Country: United States
- State: Pennsylvania
- County: Delaware
- Township: Upper Darby Township
- Established: October 1996

Government
  - Mayor: Ed Brown (D)

Area
  - Total: 3.2 sq mi (8.3 km^{2})
  - Land: 3.2 sq mi (8.3 km^{2})
  - Water: 0.0 sq mi (0 km^{2})
- Elevation: 246 ft (75 m)

Population (2010)
  - Total: 28,043
  - Density: 8,800/sq mi (3,400/km^{2})
- Time zone: UTC-5 (EST)
  - Summer (DST): UTC-4 (EDT)
- ZIP Code: 19026
- Area codes: 610 and 484

Drexel Hill is a neighborhood and census-designated place (CDP) located in Upper Darby Township, Pennsylvania, United States. The population was 29,181 at the 2020 census, an increase over 28,043 in 2010, and accounting for over one-third of Upper Darby Township's population.

== Geography ==
Drexel Hill is located in the western part of Upper Darby Township at 39°57′00″N 75°18′7″W (39.949962, -75.301841). The neighborhood is eight miles (13 km) from Center City, Philadelphia and is bordered to the north by Haverford Township, to the east by the Kirklyn, Highland Park, Beverly Hills, and Bywood neighborhoods, to the southeast by the borough of Lansdowne, to the south by the borough of Clifton Heights and the Westbrook Park neighborhood, and to the southwest by Springfield Township. Darby Creek forms the southwestern/southern border of the CDP. U.S. Route 1 (Township Line Road) runs through the northwestern corner of the CDP and forms most of its northern border with Haverford Township.

The CDP has a total area of 3.2 square miles (8.3 km^{2}), all land.

== Historic sites ==
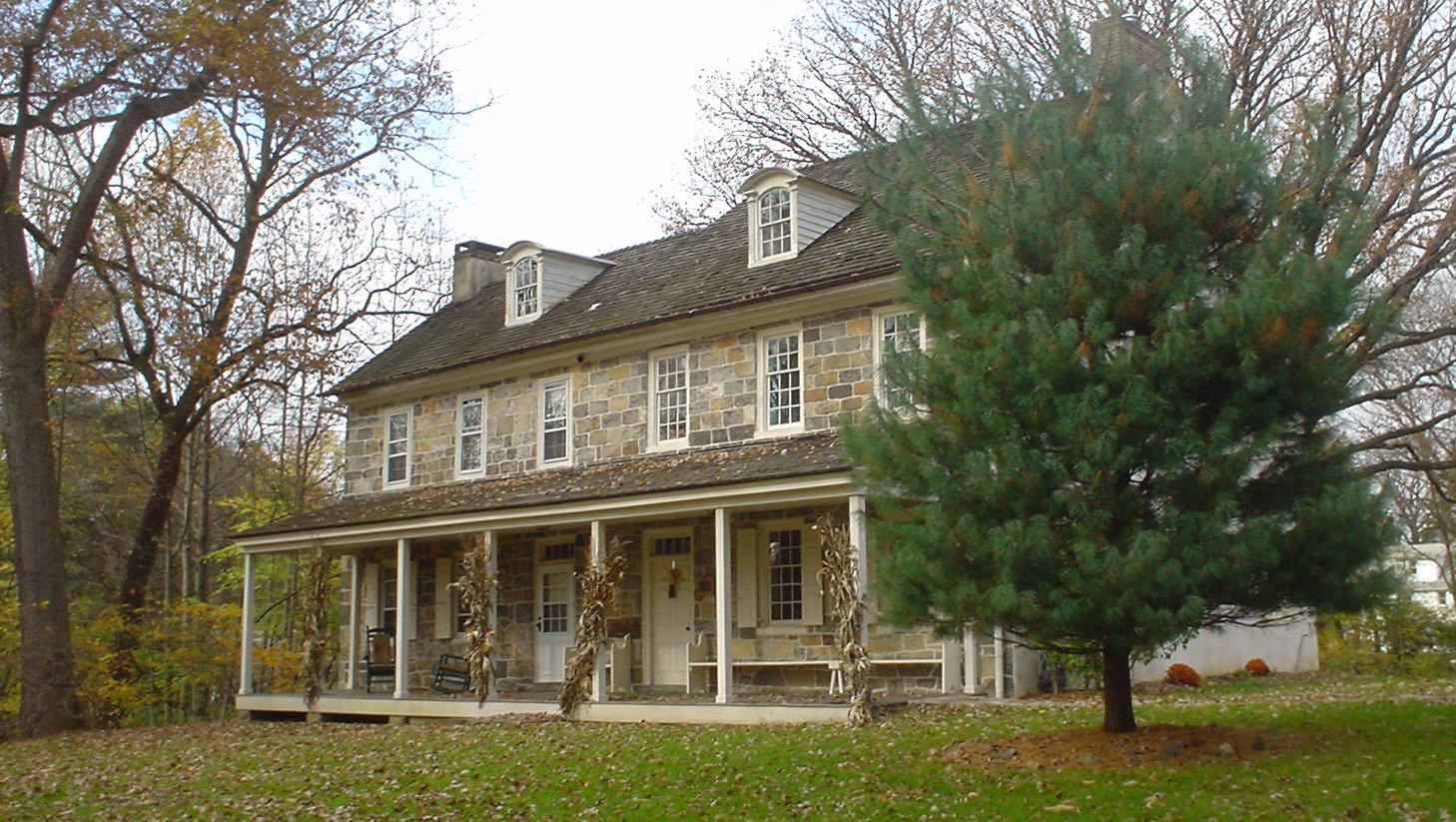
Collen Brook Farm

Collen Brook Farm is a historic home and associated buildings located at the end of a lane off Mansion Road at Marvine Avenue in Drexel Hill. The original house and barn were built about 1710 by Abraham Lewis. It was most recently acquired by Upper Darby Township in 1989. It is open to the public on Sundays from May through October.

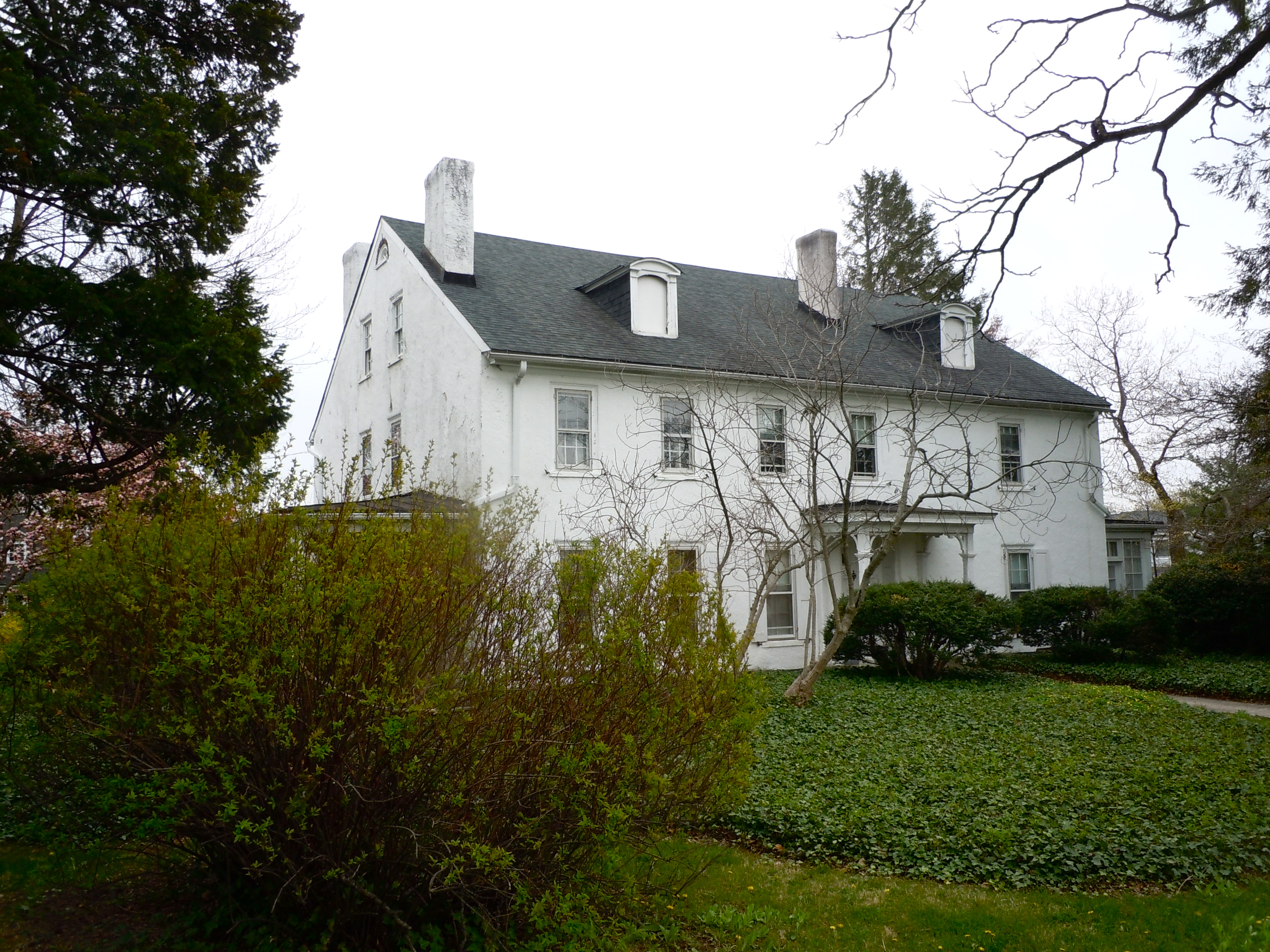
Thornfield, boyhood home of Thomas Garrett

Thornfield, the estate of famed abolitionist and Quaker Thomas Garrett, lies on Garrett Road (named for his family, who were among the earliest settlers of that part of the township) and Maple Avenue in Drexel Hill. Garrett resided here before 1822 and would later work as a station master in Wilmington, Delaware, the last stop on the Underground Railroad. In 1956, the Thornfield estate was purchased by Caroline and Walter Isard, active Quakers who moved to the area when Walter founded the Regional Science department at the University of Pennsylvania. As of 2014, the estate is owned by Randal T. Rioux. It is currently undergoing restoration, along with renovations necessary to preserve its history and allow for modern capabilities.

== Demographics ==
Historical population
Census	Pop.	Note	%±
1990	29,744		—
2000	29,364		−1.3%
2010	28,043		−4.5%
2020	29,181		4.1%

=== 2020 census ===
As of the 2020 census, Drexel Hill had a population of 29,181. The median age was 38.7 years. 21.4% of residents were under the age of 18 and 15.4% of residents were 65 years of age or older. For every 100 females there were 91.5 males, and for every 100 females age 18 and over there were 88.3 males age 18 and over.

100.0% of residents lived in urban areas, while 0.0% lived in rural areas.

There were 11,761 households in Drexel Hill, of which 29.5% had children under the age of 18 living in them. Of all households, 43.2% were married-couple households, 18.9% were households with a male householder and no spouse or partner present, and 30.9% were households with a female householder and no spouse or partner present. About 30.2% of all households were made up of individuals and 11.1% had someone living alone who was 65 years of age or older.

There were 12,384 housing units, of which 5.0% were vacant. The homeowner vacancy rate was 1.4% and the rental vacancy rate was 5.9%.

Racial composition as of the 2020 census
Race	Number	Percent
White	18,855	64.6%
Black or African American	6,302	21.6%
American Indian and Alaska Native	67	0.2%
Asian	1,404	4.8%
Native Hawaiian and Other Pacific Islander	11	0.0%
Some other race	603	2.1%
Two or more races	1,939	6.6%
Hispanic or Latino (of any race)	1,508	5.2%

=== 2010 census ===
As of the 2010 census the racial makeup of Drexel Hill was 87.1% White, 5.5% Black or African American, 0.1% American Indian and Alaska Native, 5.3% Asian, 0.1% Native Hawaiian and other Pacific Islander, and 2.0% other.

=== Ancestry ===
The largest ethnic groups in Drexel Hill are Irish (41.8%), Italian (24.5%), German (16.7%), English (9.9%), Polish (4.2%), United States (2.8%), Hispanic (2.2%).

=== 2000 census ===
There were 11,896 households, out of which 29.9% had children under the age of 18 living with them, 49.6% were married couples living together, 9.9% had a female householder with no husband present, and 36.9% were non-families. 32.0% of all households were made up of individuals, and 13.0% had someone living alone who was 65 years of age or older. The average household size was 2.46 and the average family size was 3.19.

In the CDP, the population was distributed with 24.3% under the age of 18, 7.5% from 18 to 24, 32.4% from 25 to 44, 20.3% from 45 to 64, and 15.5% who were 65 years of age or older. The median age was 37 years. For every 100 females, there were 90.2 males. For every 100 females age 18 and over, there were 86.4 males.

The median income for a household in the CDP was $48,765, and the median income for a family was $65,862. Males had a median income of $42,841 versus $31,904 for females. The per capita income for the CDP was $25,471. About 3.5% of families and 4.9% of the population were below the poverty line, including 4.6% of those under age 18 and 6.0% of those age 65 or over.

== Transportation ==
=== SEPTA ===
SEPTA operates two trolley lines through Drexel Hill: Route 101- a few stops in Drexel Hill are Irvington Rd, Drexel Hill Junction, School Lane, Aronimink, Drexelbrook, Drexel Park, Garrettford, Huey Avenue, School Lane, Anderson Avenue, Drexeline, Drexel Manor, Marshall Road, and Creek Road, stations to Media and Route 102 Sharon Hill, both lines begin at the 69th Street Transportation Center. Several SEPTA bus routes also operate via Drexel Hill, including routes 107, 110, 111, and 115.

=== Major roads ===
The major roads running through Drexel Hill are Township Line Road (US 1), State Road, Burmont Road, Garrett Road, Lansdowne Avenue, Marshall Road, Drexel Avenue, Edmonds Avenue and Shadeland Avenue.

== Education ==
=== Primary and secondary schools ===
The Upper Darby School District is the school district covering all of Upper Darby Township, Drexel Hill included. The school district operates the following public schools in the Drexel Hill census-designated place:

- Upper Darby Kindergarten Center
- Aronimink Elementary School
- Garretford Elementary School
- Charles Kelly Elementary School
  - The school property, previously used as the St. Charles School, is leased from the Roman Catholic Archdiocese of Philadelphia.
- Drexel Hill Middle School

Two schools, Hillcrest Elementary School, and Upper Darby High School, are adjacent to the Drexel Hill CDP and use Drexel Hill postal addresses.

The elementary schools that include Drexel Hill CDP in their catchments are Aronomink, Garretford, and Hillcrest. While Kelly is physically in Drexel Hill CDP, its catchment does not include any portion of the CDP. Drexel Hill Middle School is the sole middle school with catchments in Drexel Hill CDP.

Parochial schools in Drexel Hill

These belong to the Roman Catholic Archdiocese of Philadelphia

- Saint Andrew the Apostle School
- Saint Bernadette School
- Saint Dorothy's School
- Bonner & Prendergast Catholic High School has a Drexel Hill postal address, but is outside of the CDP

Non-parochial private schools

- Holy Child Academy

== Emergency services ==
As an Upper Darby neighborhood, Drexel Hill is served by the Upper Darby Police Department, Crozer-Keystone Paramedics, based out of Delaware County Memorial Hospital, and the Upper Darby Township Fire Department, a combination paid and volunteer department personnel at five stations:

- Company 20 - Garrettford-Drexel Hill (which is the only full-time volunteer station), housing two pumpers (engines), one ladder truck, and one rescue truck
- Company 26 - Highland Park, housing one squad, and one rescue truck
- Company 36 - Cardington-Stonehurst, housing one pumper, one squirt, and one air/light unit
- Company 37 - Upper Darby, housing one ladder truck, and one utility truck
- Company 74 - Primos-Secane-Westbrook Park, housing one quint, one pumper (including a foam pumper) and one tower ladder truck

Companies 26, 36, 37, and 74 are staffed from 7 am Monday until 7 am Saturday by career personnel from IAFF Local 2493. They are supplemented by volunteers during the weekdays and fully staffed by volunteers on weekends.

== Notable people ==
Television personality Dick Clark lived from 1954 to 1956 at the Drexelbrook Apartment complex while hosting Barr's Diamond Theater and a radio show on WFIL, before he was hired to host American Bandstand. Television personality Ed McMahon also lived at the Drexelbrook before teaming up with Johnny Carson on Do You Trust Your Wife?, then The Tonight Show.

Children's author Lloyd Alexander lived in Drexel Hill with his wife and several cats.

1970s folk/pop singer-songwriter Jim Croce grew up in the Bywood and Drexel Hill sections of Upper Darby. Croce graduated Upper Darby Sr. High in 1960 and attended Villanova University 1961–1965. He married Ingrid Jacobson of Wallingford. Her family is believed to have bought the house Dick Clark sold upon leaving for the west coast when Bandstand left WFIL in the early '60s. Croce was the first to be inducted on Upper Darby High School's "Wall of Fame" in April 1976.

Former United States Representative Pat Meehan of the Seventh Congressional District of Pennsylvania lives in Drexel Hill.

Alan Graham MacDiarmid ONZ (April 14, 1927 – February 7, 2007), one of three recipients of the Nobel Prize for Chemistry in 2000, died in 2007 after falling in his Drexel Hill home. He is buried at Arlington Cemetery in Drexel Hill.

Nancy Meyers, producer and director of movies including The Parent Trap (1998), What Women Want (2000), Something's Gotta Give (2003), The Holiday (2006), It's Complicated (2009) and The Intern (2015), was raised in a Jewish household in the Drexel Hill area.

Drexel Hill resident Gregore J. Sambor was a former commissioner of the Philadelphia Police Department best known for his role in the 1985 bombing of MOVE, in which six adults and five children died after he told firefighters to stand down and "let the fire burn".
