= Providence Road/Media station =

Providence Rd/Media
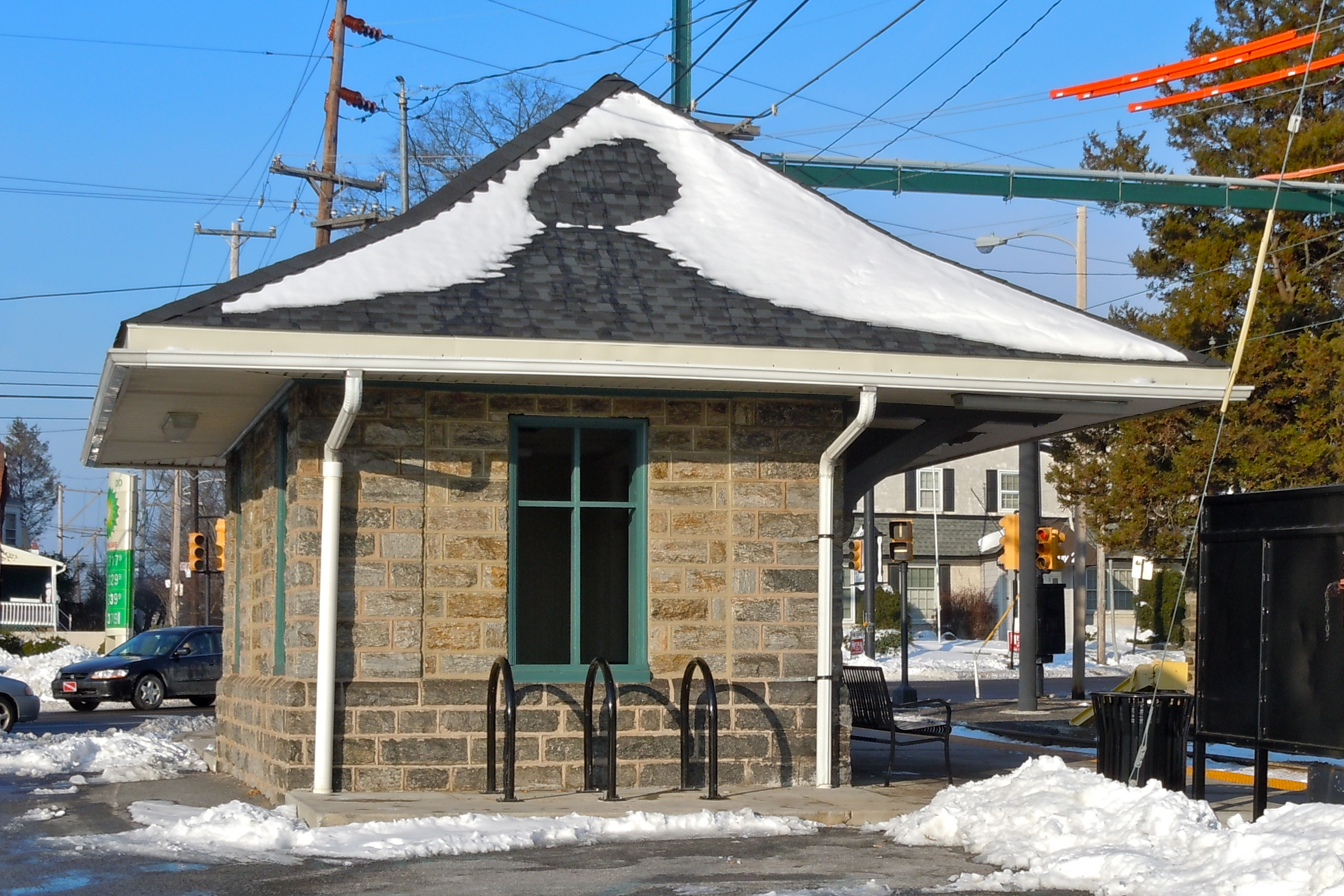

General information
- Location: Providence Road & State Street; Media, Pennsylvania
- Coordinates: 39.9167°N 75.3807°W
- Owner: SEPTA
- Platforms: 1 side platform
- Tracks: 2 (1 storage)

Construction
- Parking: Yes
- Cycle facilities: Yes; bicycle racks
- Accessible: No

History
- Electrified: Overhead lines
- Former names: Bowling Green (–2010); Providence Road (2010–2025)

Services
| Preceding station | SEPTA Metro | Following station |
|---|---|---|
| Orange Street/Media major stops Terminus | D (SEPTA Metro) | Beatty Road toward 69th Street T.C. |
Location

Providence Road/Media station is a stop on the D in Media, Pennsylvania. It is officially located at Providence Road (PA 252) and State Street.

Trolleys arriving at this station travel between 69th Street Transit Center in Upper Darby Township, Pennsylvania and Orange Street in Media. The station has a shed with a roof where people can go inside when it is raining. It also has a half dozen free parking spaces along the tracks on the southeast corner of the railroad crossing at Providence Road.

Providence Road/Media station is the location where the D1 leaves State Street and enters a separate right of way. A storage track begins east of Providence Road across from the station shed that eventually becomes the second track. Additionally, a shopping center exists along Baltimore Pike between North Providence and Beatty Roads, which has a stop of its own.
