= Orange Street/Media station =

Light rail stop in Pennsylvania, United States

Orange St/Media
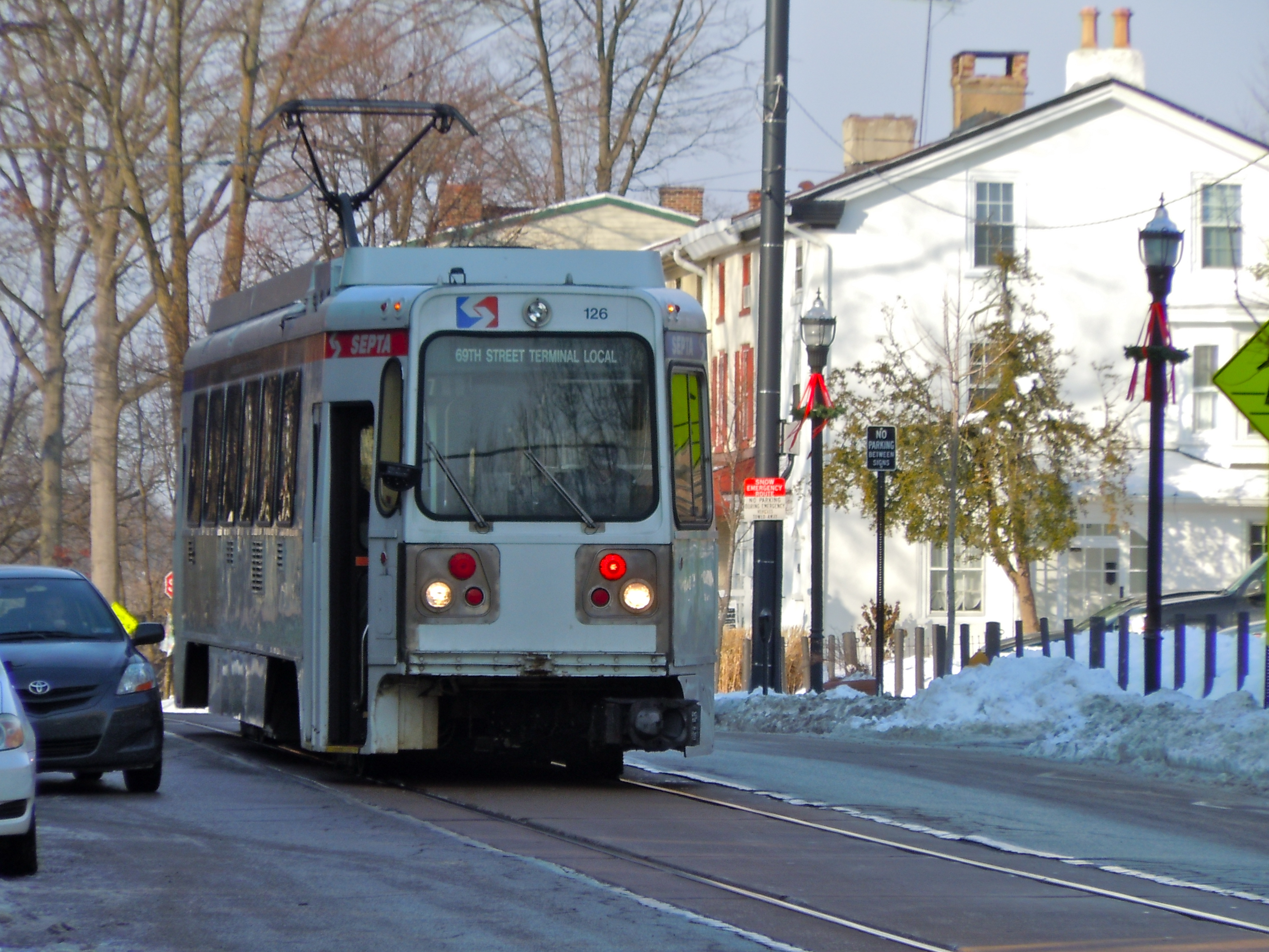
- D1 trolley at the end of the line

General information
- Location: State & Orange Streets; Media, PA
- Coordinates: 39.9186°N 75.3938°W
- Owner: SEPTA
- Platforms: None; board from street
- Tracks: 1

Construction
- Structure type: Street-running
- Accessible: No

History
- Opened: 1906
- Electrified: Overhead lines

Services
| Preceding station | SEPTA Metro | Following station |
|---|---|---|
| Terminus | major stops | Providence Road/Media toward 69th Street T.C. |
Location

Orange Street/Media station is a light rail station in Media, Pennsylvania. It is a street running stop located at Orange and State Streets in Downtown Media. There are no physical platforms; passengers board and exit trolleys directly from street level. Trolley service is provided by the D and runs east to 69th Street Transit Center in Upper Darby. Orange Street is the westernmost station on the line, and is unusual in that the tracks simply and abruptly dead-end in the middle of the street; there is no bumper block, balloon loop, or train yard at this location although an overhead wire device will knock down the trolleys' overhead pantograph so that they cannot continue past the end of track (although some cars have slightly derailed there and gouge marks are evident in the asphalt).

Orange Street station is located approximately 0.4 miles away from the Media regional rail station, served by the Media/Wawa Line. However, no direct connection exists between the light rail and regional rail stations and no free transfers or timed connections are provided. There is also a similarly indirect connection to the Route 110 local bus operating approximately 1 block south on parallel Baltimore Avenue.

== Gallery ==
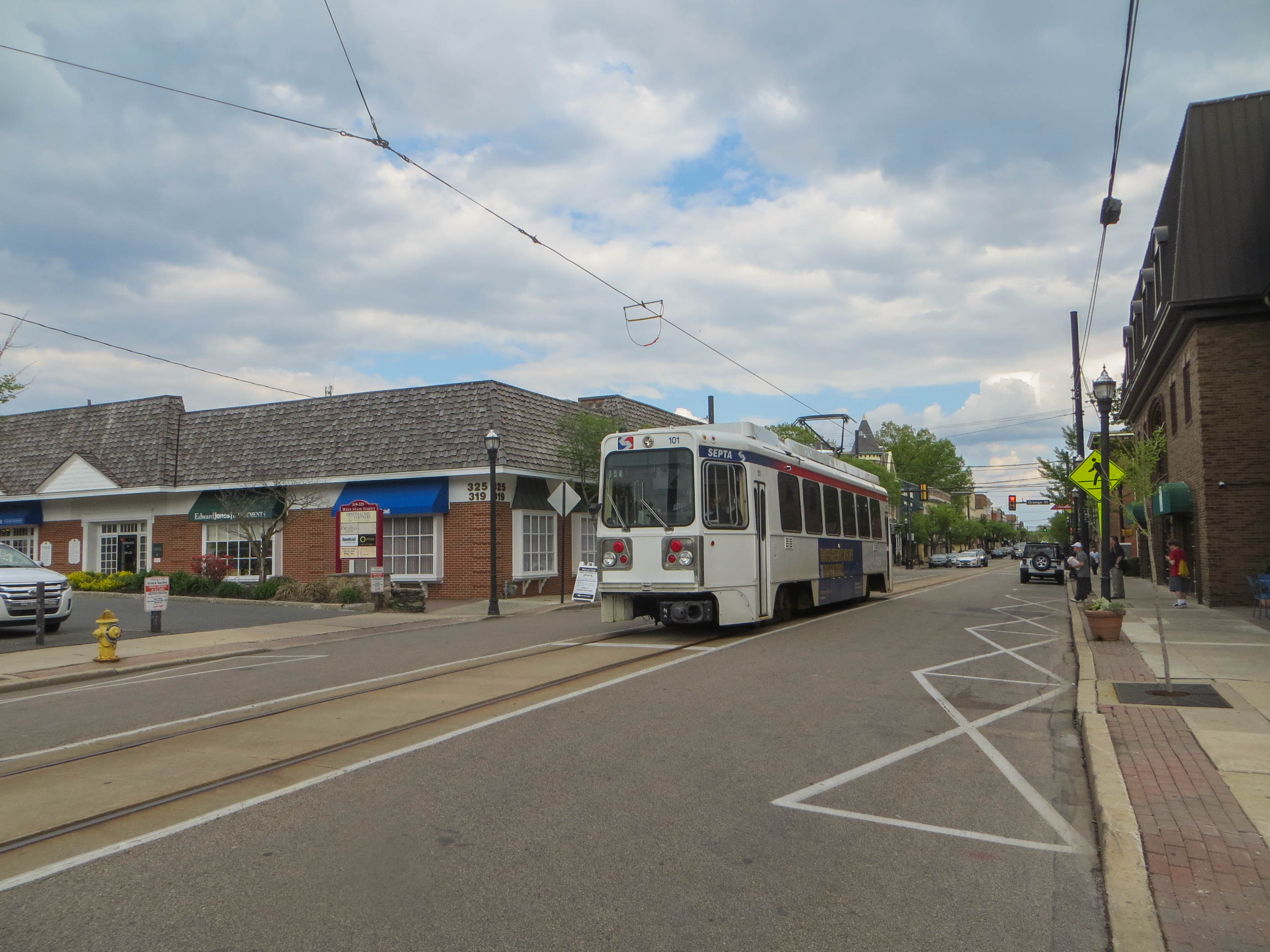

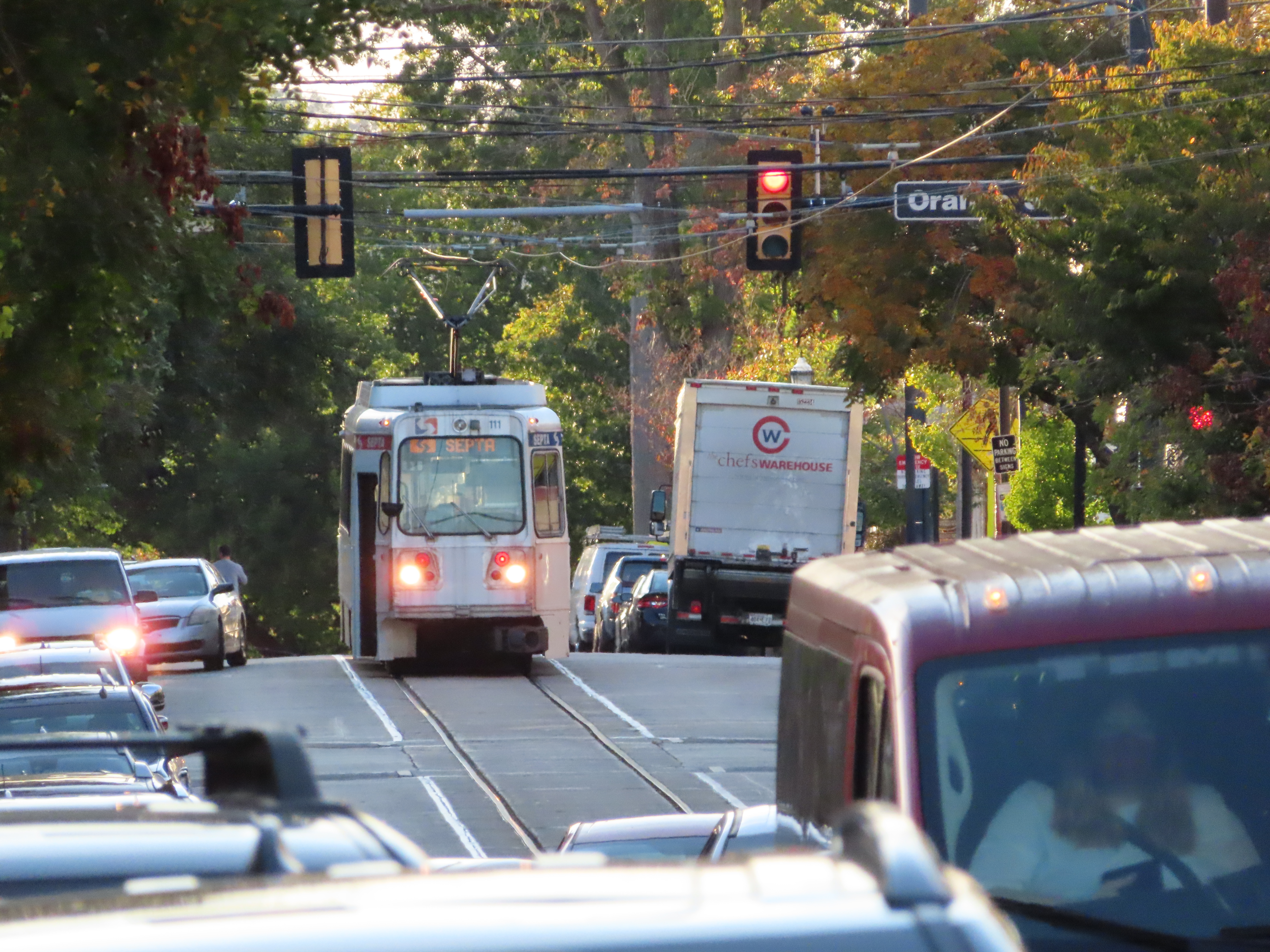

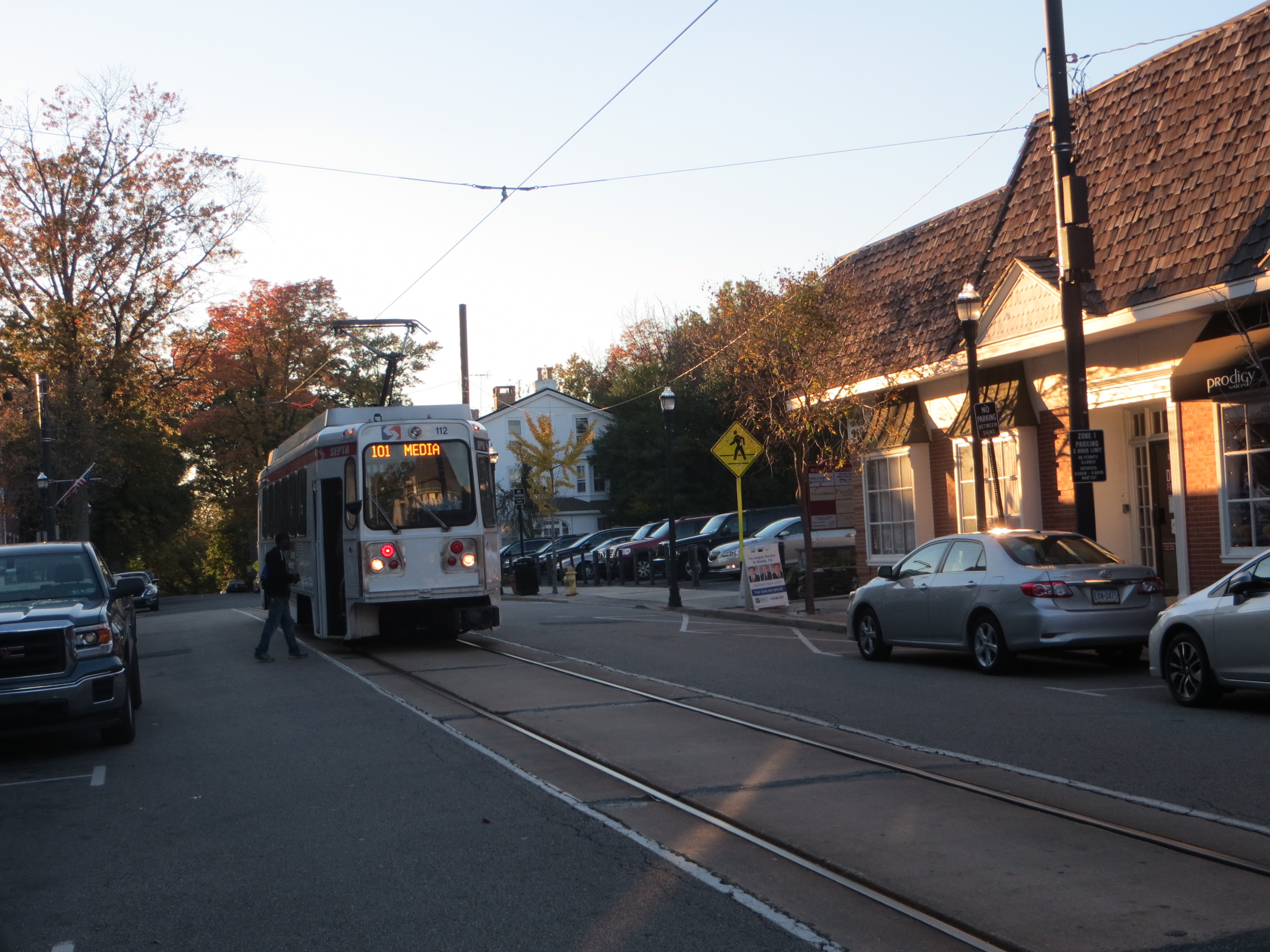

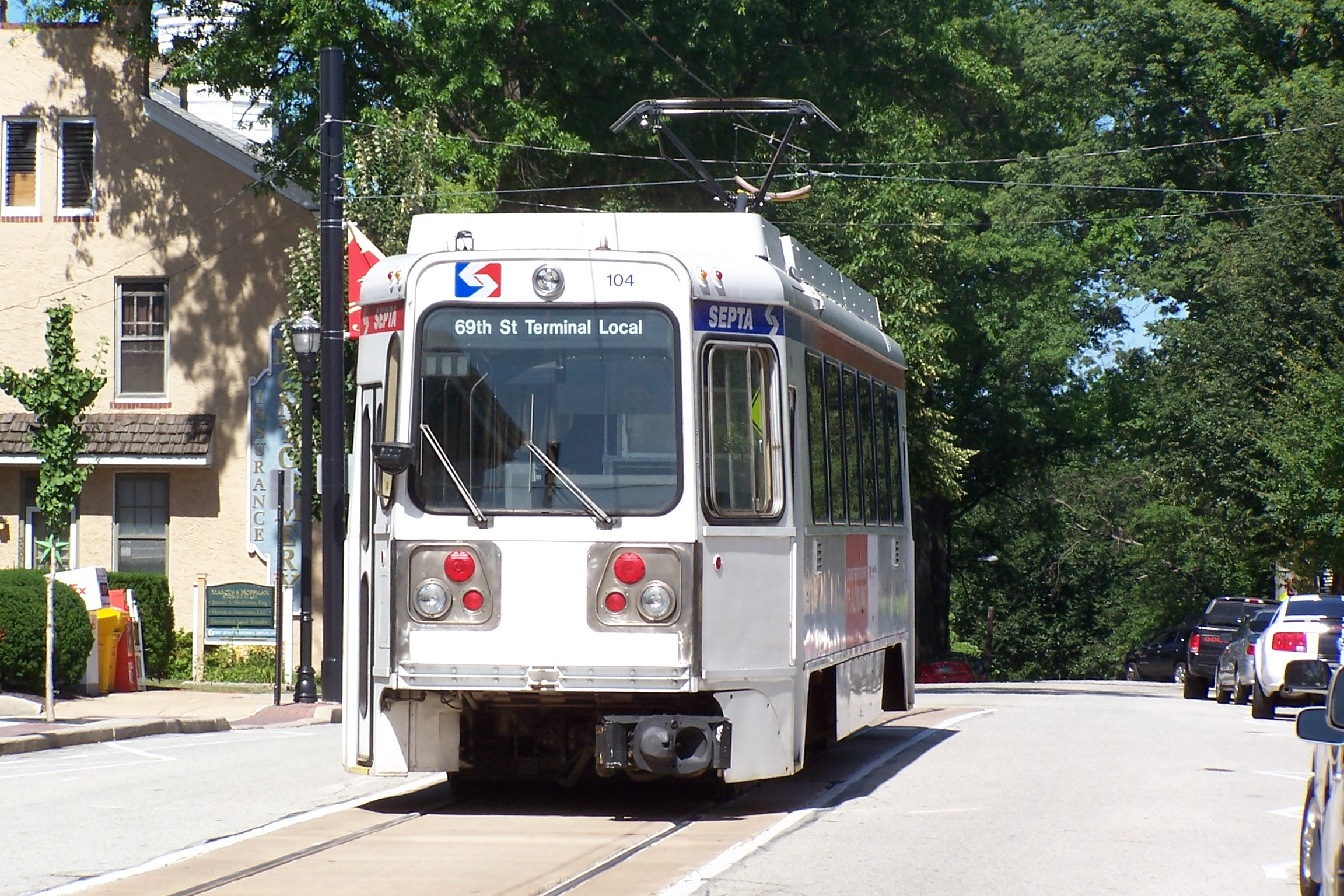
