= 9–10th & Locust station =

PATCO Speedline rapid transit station in Philadelphia

9–10th & Locust
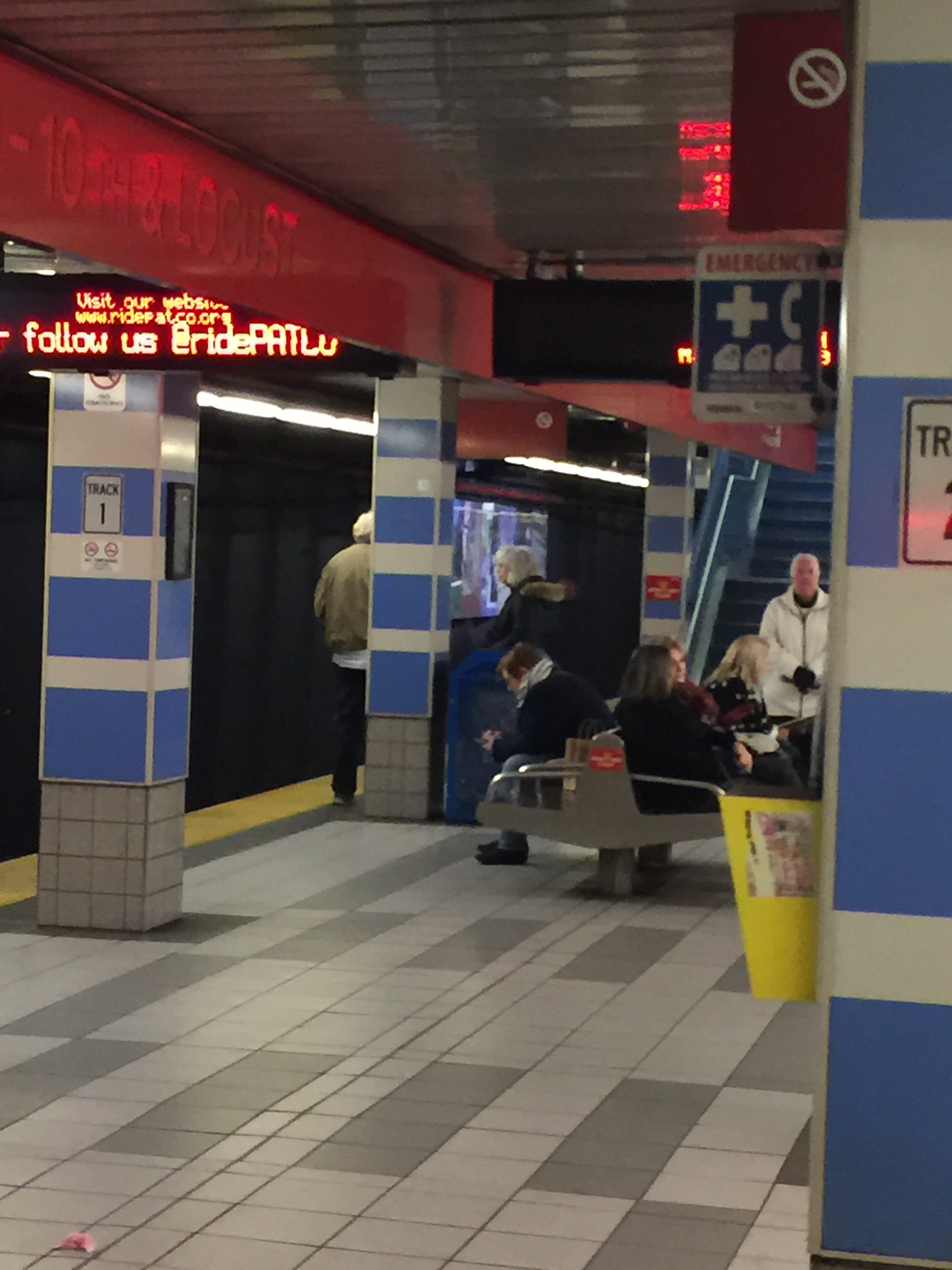
- 9–10th & Locust station platform in 2018

General information
- Location: 9th and Locust Streets; Philadelphia, Pennsylvania, U.S.
- Coordinates: 39.9473°N 75.1563°W
- Owner: City of Philadelphia
- Operator: Delaware River Port Authority
- Platforms: 1 island platform
- Tracks: 2
- Connections: SEPTA City Bus: 12

Construction
- Cycle facilities: Racks
- Accessible: Yes

History
- Opened: February 15, 1953

Passengers
- 2025: 1,286 (average weekday)
- Rank: 7 of 14

Services
Preceding station	DRPA	Following station
12–13th & Locust toward 15–16th & Locust	PATCO Speedline	8th & Market toward Lindenwold
Location

9–10th & Locust station is an underground rapid transit station on the PATCO Speedline, operated by the Delaware River Port Authority. It is located in the Washington Square West neighborhood of Center City Philadelphia, under Locust Street between 9th and 10th Streets.

This is one of the few PATCO stations that does not have 24-hour service; the station is closed daily between 12:07 am and 4:15 am.

== Notable places nearby ==
The station is within walking distance of the following notable places:

- Jefferson Hospital for Neuroscience
- Thomas Jefferson University Hospital
- Pennsylvania Hospital
- Walnut Street Theatre
- Wills Eye Hospital
