= Woodcrest station =

Rapid transit station in New Jersey

Woodcrest
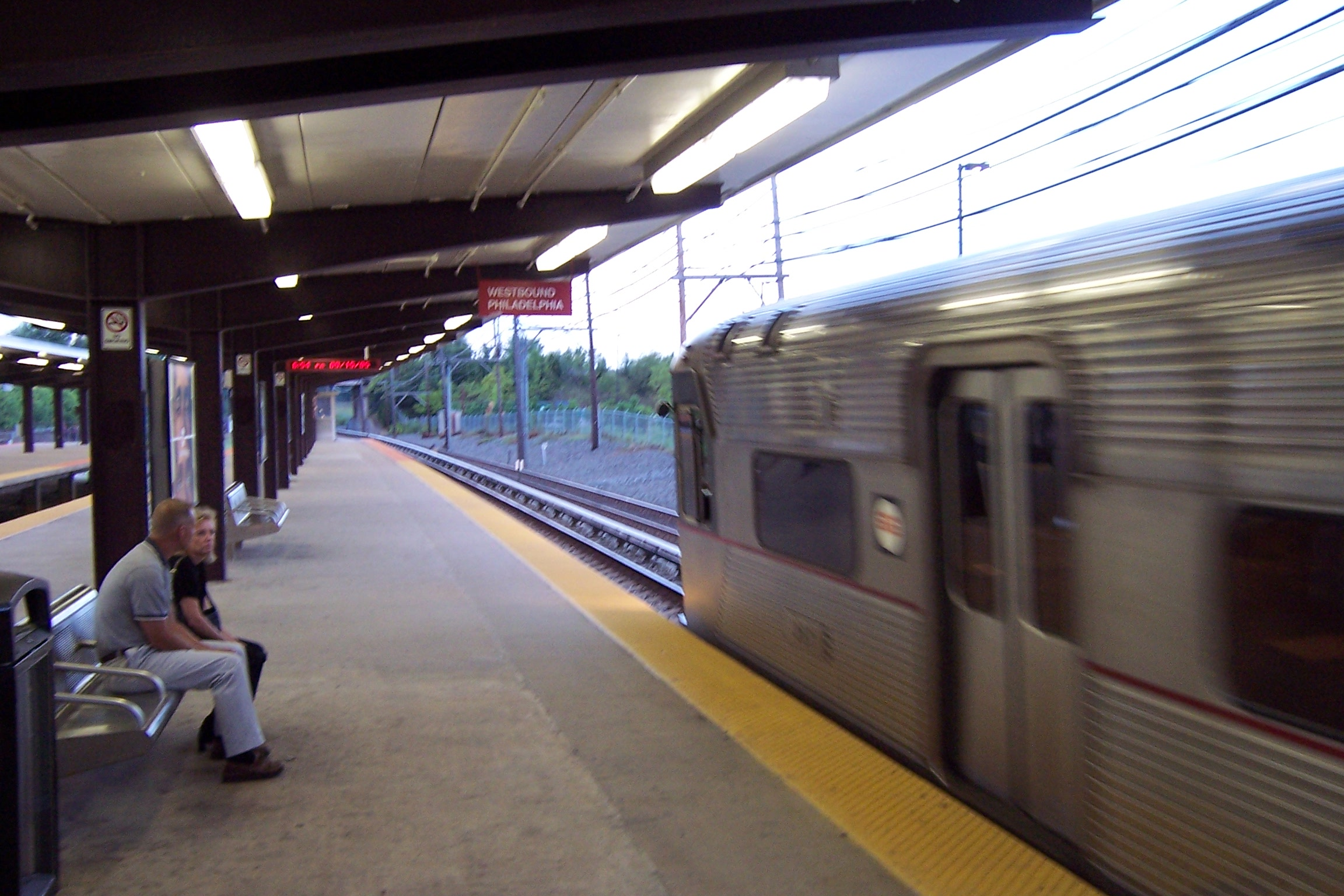
- A Philadelphia-bound train arrives at the station in 2005

General information
- Location: 200 Tindale Avenue; Cherry Hill, New Jersey
- Coordinates: 39.87045°N 75.01117°W
- Owner: Delaware River Port Authority
- Platforms: 2 island platforms
- Tracks: 3 (PATCO), 1 (Atlantic City Line)

Construction
- Parking: 2,678 spaces, kiss and ride
- Cycle facilities: Racks
- Accessible: Yes

History
- Opened: February 1, 1980

Passengers
- 2025: 1,469 (average weekday)
- Rank: 4 of 14

Services
Preceding station	DRPA	Following station
Haddonfield toward 15–16th & Locust	PATCO Speedline	Ashland toward Lindenwold
Atlantic City Line does not stop here
Location

Woodcrest station is an at-grade rapid transit station on the PATCO Speedline, operated by the Delaware River Port Authority. It is located in Woodcrest section of Cherry Hill, New Jersey, after which the station is named, near the intersection of Woodcrest Road and Melrose Avenue.

== History ==
The PATCO line opened on January 4, 1969. Woodcrest was a later infill station, was designed as a park and ride facility with a direct connection to the adjacent Interstate 295 via exit 31. The station opened on February 1, 1980, coinciding with the first use of the PATCO II transit cars. Ferry Avenue Local trains were replaced with Woodcrest Local trains on September 20, 1980.

As part of PATCO's 2020 "Station Enhancements Project", Woodcrest station was remodeled. Changes consist of a new backlit entrance sign, and a complete interior re-build, including the replacement of the existing sloped floor for a flat surface and stairs, while retaining a small section of sloped floor for accessibility. The customer service center was also relocated and entirely re-built, white LED interior and exterior lighting was added, the glass block windows were replaced with a curtain wall system, and the exterior entrance canopy, headhouses, and both elevated platforms were remodeled.

== Station layout ==
Like all PATCO stations, Woodcrest is a two-level station. The platform is located at grade level, while the station house is located below-grade. The station has two island platforms with a pocket track between them and the main tracks on the outside. The center track is used as the terminus for Woodcrest Local trains during the morning peak period. The single track of the Atlantic City Line runs along the east side of the station.
