= Collingswood station =

Rapid transit station in New Jersey

Collingswood
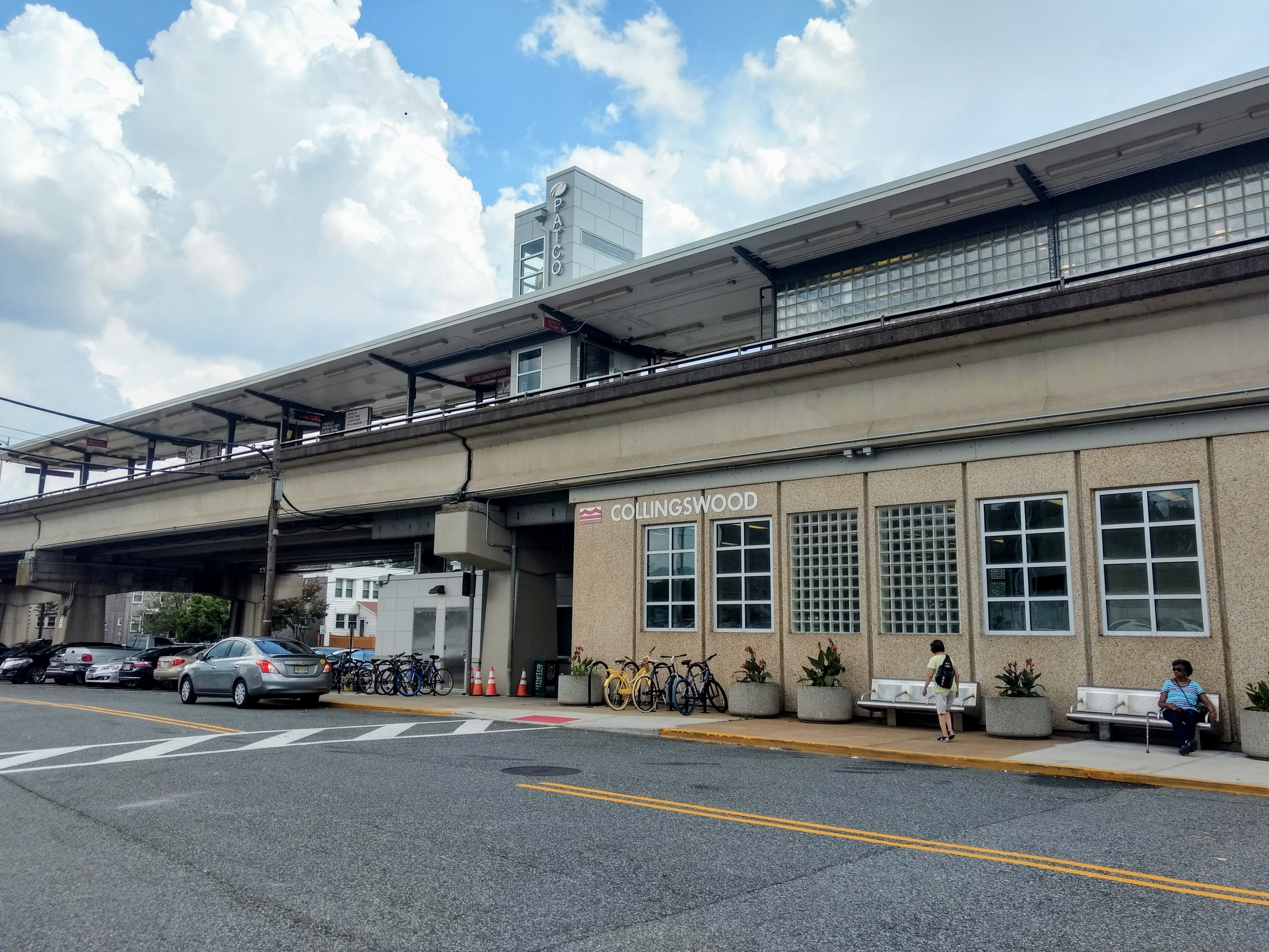
- Collingswood station in August 2019

General information
- Location: 864 South Atlantic Avenue; Collingswood, New Jersey
- Coordinates: 39.9136°N 75.0647°W
- Owner: Delaware River Port Authority
- Platforms: 1 island platform
- Tracks: 2
- Connections: NJ Transit Bus: 403, 451

Construction
- Parking: 705 spaces
- Cycle facilities: Racks
- Accessible: Yes

History
- Opened: January 4, 1969

Passengers
- 2025: 1,179 (average weekday)
- Rank: 8 of 14

Services
Preceding station	DRPA	Following station
Ferry Avenue toward 15–16th & Locust	PATCO Speedline	Westmont toward Lindenwold
Location

Collingswood station is an active rapid transit station and park and ride in the borough of Collingswood, Camden County, New Jersey. Located on a trestle over South Atlantic Avenue, the station serves trains of PATCO Speedline (operated by the Delaware River Port Authority) between 15–16th & Locust station in Philadelphia, Pennsylvania and Lindenwold station in the eponymous borough of Lindenwold, New Jersey. Collingswood station consists of a two-level station design, with the station house at street level and an island platform on the trestle.
