= Ashland station (PATCO) =

Rapid transit station in New Jersey

Ashland
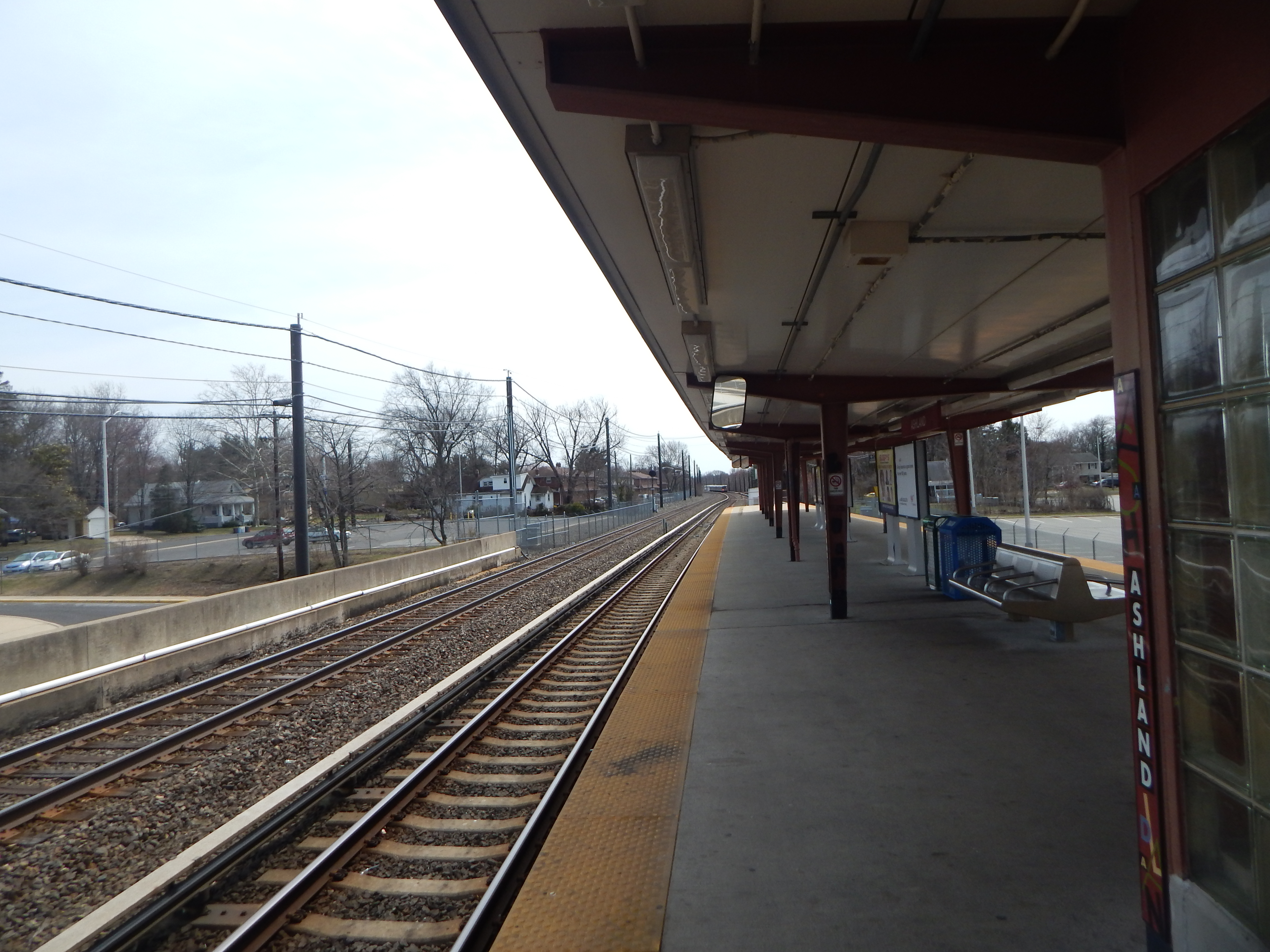
- Ashland station platform in April 2015

General information
- Location: 2 Burnt Mill Road; Voorhees Township, New Jersey
- Coordinates: 39.85856°N 75.00920°W
- Owner: Delaware River Port Authority
- Platforms: 1 island platform
- Tracks: 2 (PATCO), 1 (Atlantic City Line)

Construction
- Parking: 1,041 spaces
- Cycle facilities: Racks
- Accessible: Yes

History
- Opened: January 4, 1969

Passengers
- 2025: 894 (average weekday)
- Rank: 10 of 14

Services
Preceding station	DRPA	Following station
Woodcrest toward 15–16th & Locust	PATCO Speedline	Lindenwold Terminus
Location

Ashland station is an at-grade rapid transit station on the PATCO Speedline, operated by the Delaware River Port Authority. It is located in Voorhees Township, New Jersey near the intersection of Evesham and Burnt Mill Roads.

== Station layout ==
Ashland is a two-level station. The platform is at-grade, while the station house is located below grade. An elevator between the platform and the station house was added in 2020, making the station accessible to people with disabilities.
