= Avenue of the Arts =

Avenue of the Arts may refer to:

- Avenue of the Arts (Philadelphia), part of Broad Street in Philadelphia, Pennsylvania, U.S.
- Avenue of the Arts (Boston), part of Huntington Avenue in Boston, Massachusetts, U.S.
