= Avenue of the Arts (Philadelphia) =

Cultural district in Pennsylvania, US

- Neighborhood of Philadelphia
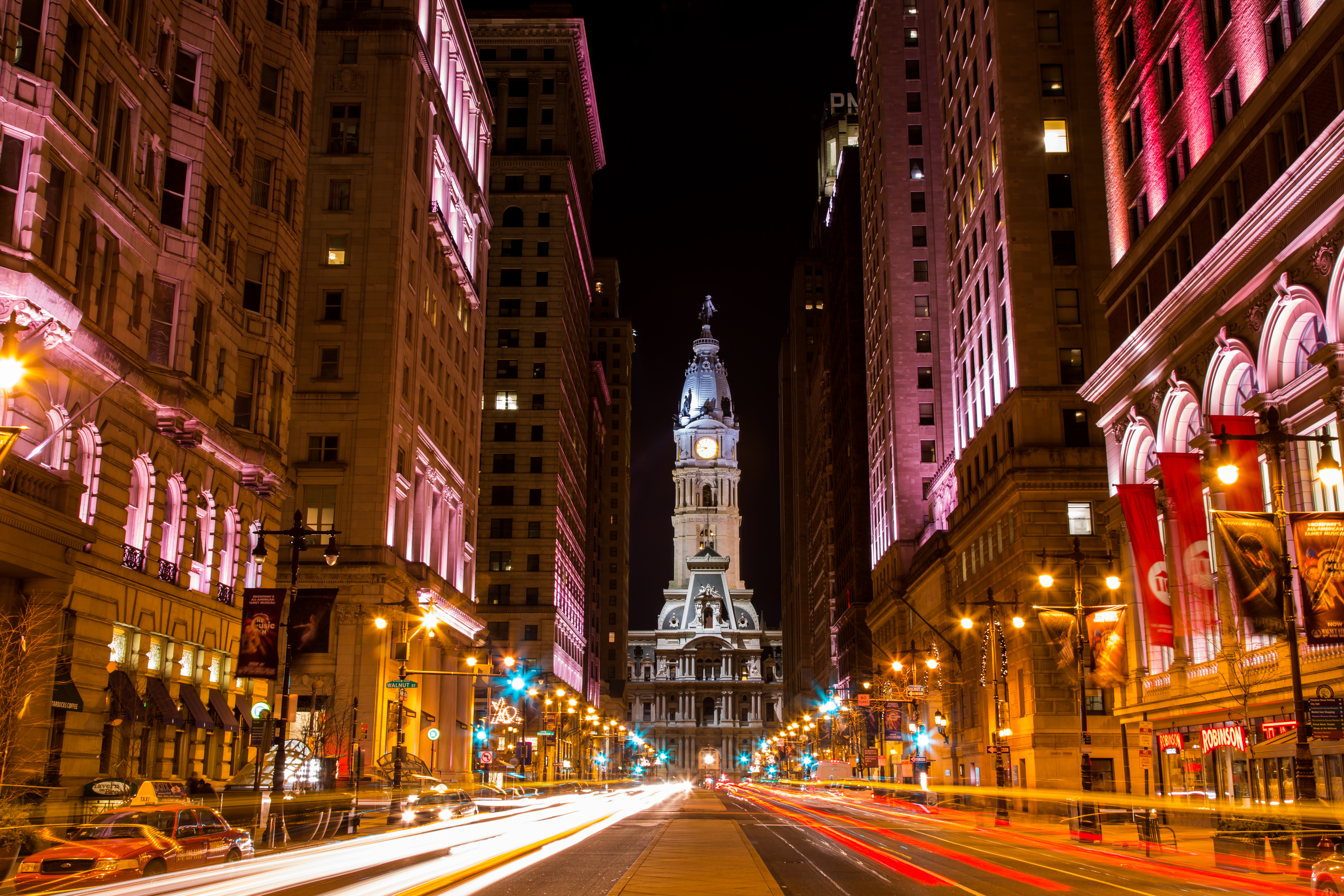
- Avenue of the Arts neighborhood along Broad Street in Philadelphia

- Location within Philadelphia
- Coordinates: 39°56′28″N 75°09′56″W
- Country: United States
- State: Pennsylvania
- County: Philadelphia
- City: Philadelphia
- Area codes: 215, 267 and 445

Avenue of the Arts is a city-designated arts cultural district on a segment of Broad Street in Philadelphia, Pennsylvania, United States that includes many of the city's cultural institutions, most notably the theater district south of City Hall. The designation can be found as far south as Washington Avenue and as far north as the Cecil B. Moore neighborhood.

== History ==
The name Avenue of the Arts originated in a strategy by mayor Ed Rendell to redevelop South Broad Street in Center City. Avenue of the Arts originally ran along Broad Street from Locust Street south to Lombard Street. The Avenue's definition was expanded to North Broad Street by city planners under mayor John F. Street's administration to encourage further development in the area. The Avenue of the Arts is overseen by the non-profit organization Avenue of the Arts, Inc. led by Desaree K. Jones, the organization's executive director.

In January 2026, city officials hosted a groundbreaking ceremony for renovating a ten-block section of the Avenue of the Arts. The renovation was designed by Gensler and OJB with an estimated cost of $150 million. The project includes expanding pedestrian space and greenery, adding street furniture and artwork, and redesigning the medians.

== Features ==
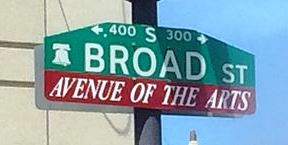
Avenue of the Arts street sign

Avenue of the Arts is the locale for many of the city's large theatres, including Kimmel Center for the Performing Arts (home of the Philadelphia Orchestra), the Academy of Music, Miller Theater, Wilma Theater, Liacouras Center, and Suzanne Roberts Theatre. Buildings for the University of the Arts are located just south and east of the Kimmel Center; the Miller Theatre is often used for high-end productions involving the school.

The Wanamaker Organ, the world's largest playing pipe organ famed for its daily recitals, is located in the Grand Court of Macy's, just where Broad Street traffic circles Penn Square.

Philadelphia International Records' offices and gift shop is also located along this strip. Just south of the strip is the Clef Club of Jazz and Performing Arts, and on Broad Street in this vicinity, just north of City Hall, is the Pennsylvania Academy of Fine Arts, which, founded in 1805, is America's oldest art school and museum and boasts a distinguished collection of American art.

Several parking garages and public transportation services provided by SEPTA and DRPA at the Walnut–Locust, 12-13th Street, and 15-16th Street stations, served by the Broad Street Line and the Lindenwold Line. The availability of public transportation makes Avenue of the Arts highly accessible to visitors.

== See also ==
- Broad Street (Philadelphia)
- Broad Street Historic District (Philadelphia)
- Avenue of Technology (Philadelphia)
