= Walnut–Locust station =

Rapid transit station in Philadelphia

Walnut–Locust
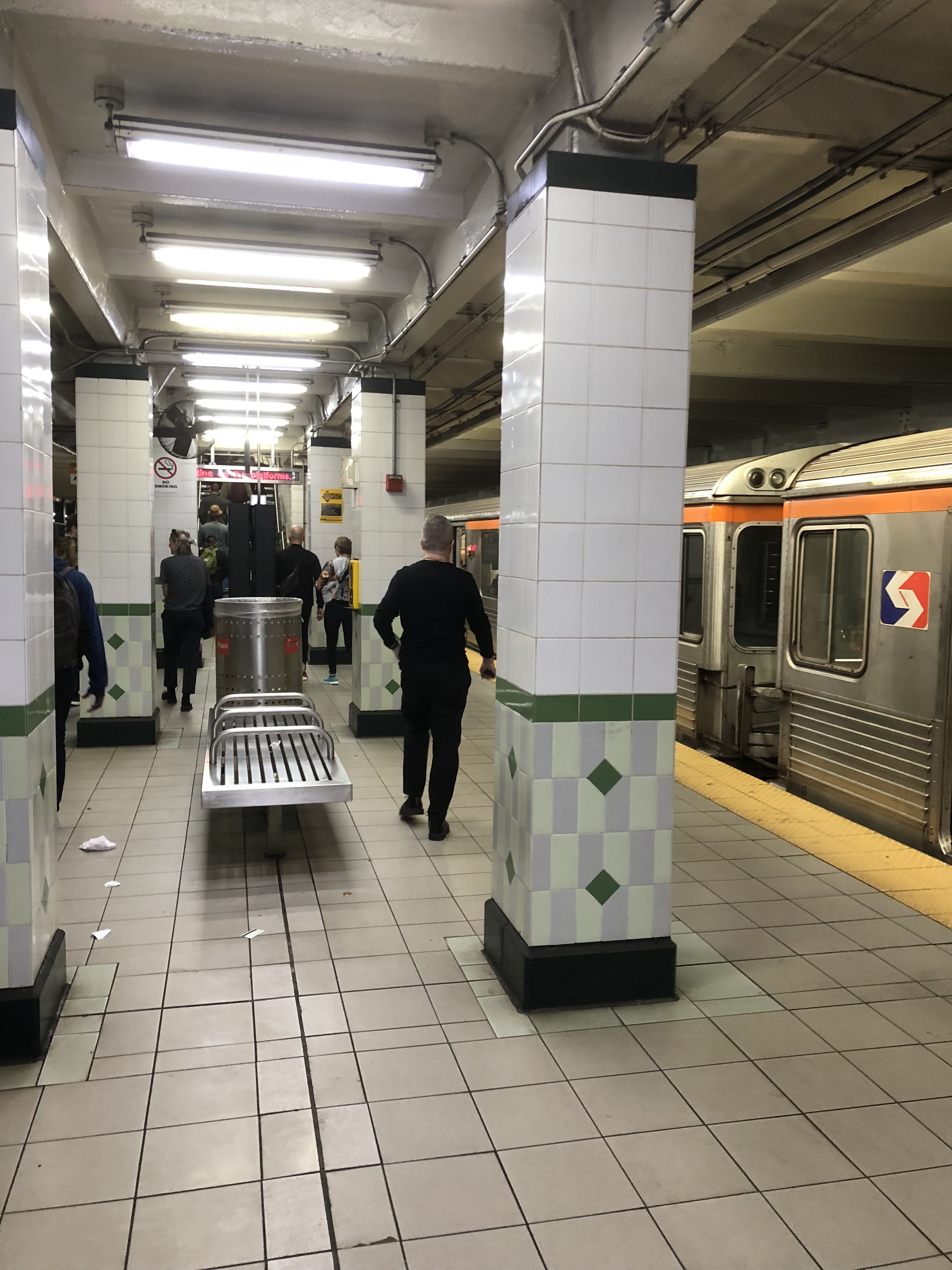
- Walnut–Locust station platform

General information
- Location: 200 South Broad Street; Philadelphia, Pennsylvania, U.S.
- Coordinates: 39.9493°N 75.1643°W
- Owner: City of Philadelphia
- Operator: SEPTA
- Platforms: 2 island platforms
- Tracks: 4
- Connections: PATCO (at 12–13th & Locust or 15-16th & Locust); SEPTA City Bus: 4, 9, 12, 21, 27, 32, 42

Construction
- Structure type: Underground
- Accessible: Yes, except transfer to PATCO at 12-13th & Locust

History
- Opened: April 20, 1930

Services
Preceding station	SEPTA Metro	Following station
Lombard–South toward NRG Station	B (SEPTA Metro)	15th Street/City Hall toward Fern Rock T.C.
Terminus	B (SEPTA Metro)	15th Street/City Hall toward Fern Rock T.C.
NRG special events Terminus	B (SEPTA Metro)	15th Street/City Hall toward Fern Rock T.C.
Location

Walnut–Locust is a subway station on the SEPTA Metro B in Philadelphia, Pennsylvania. The station is located between Walnut Street and Locust Street at 200 South Broad Street in the Avenue of the Arts district of Center City, Philadelphia.

Walnut–Locust is served by local trains, special express trains for sporting events, and is the southern terminus for express trains, which reverse direction on tracks immediately south of the station. For B2 special express trains, this station is the last stop before its terminus at the NRG station.

It is the southernmost station in the Center City Concourse, the 500,000+ sq ft underground pedestrian concourse in Center City, which extends to Spruce Street. The concourse connects to 15th Street/City Hall, the L, T, Regional Rail and PATCO Speedline's 12–13th & Locust Station and 15–16th & Locust Station. No free interchange is available.

Passengers utilizing Walnut–Locust station may access the Kimmel Center for the Performing Arts, the Bellevue shops and restaurants, and the Academy of Music. Seven blocks east of the station lies Washington Square, while Rittenhouse Square lies four blocks west.

== History ==
Walnut–Locust station was built by the city of Philadelphia and opened on April 20, 1930. This extended express trains one stop south from their initial terminus at City Hall station.

== Gallery ==
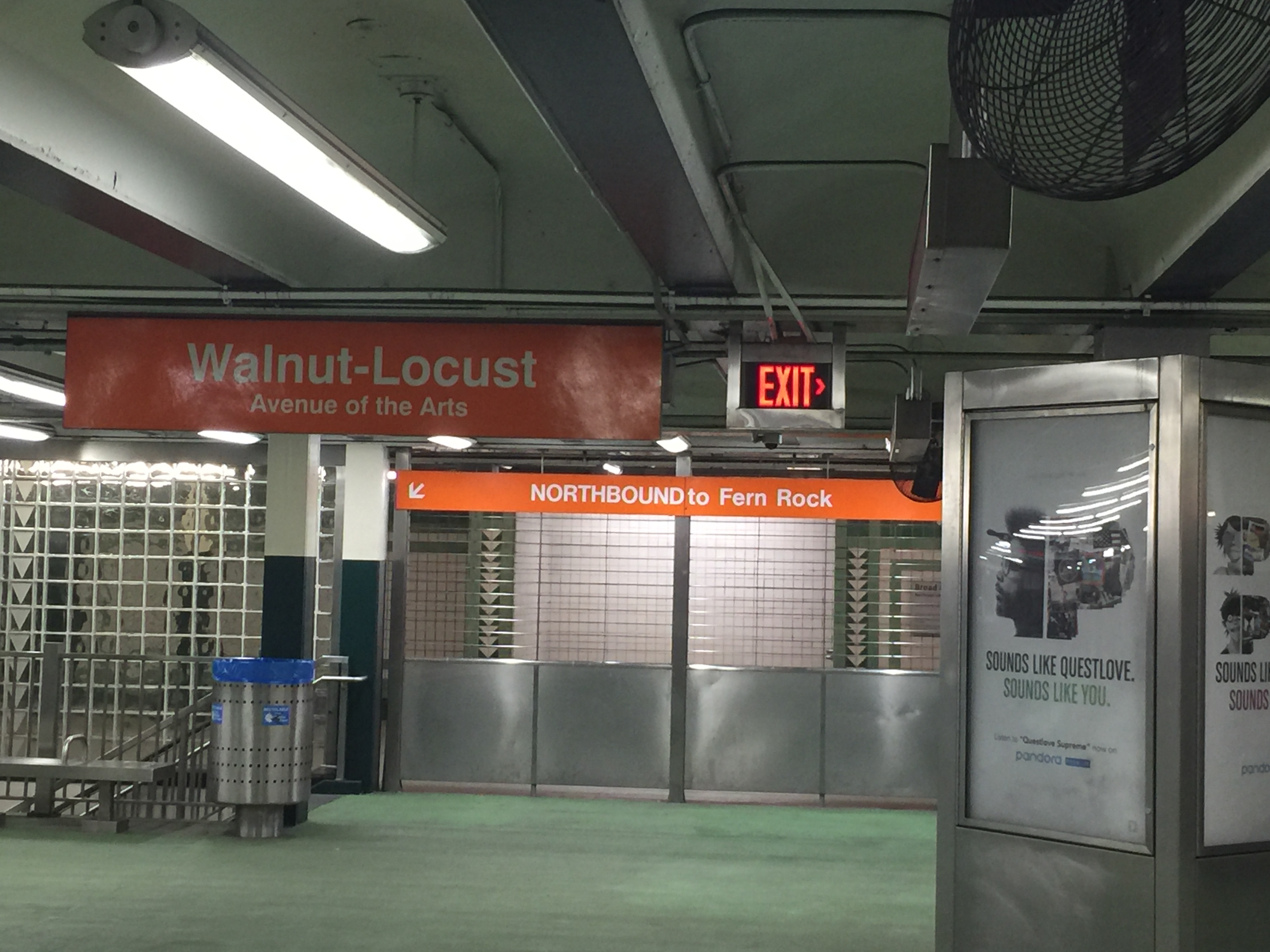
Station entrance separated from common complex

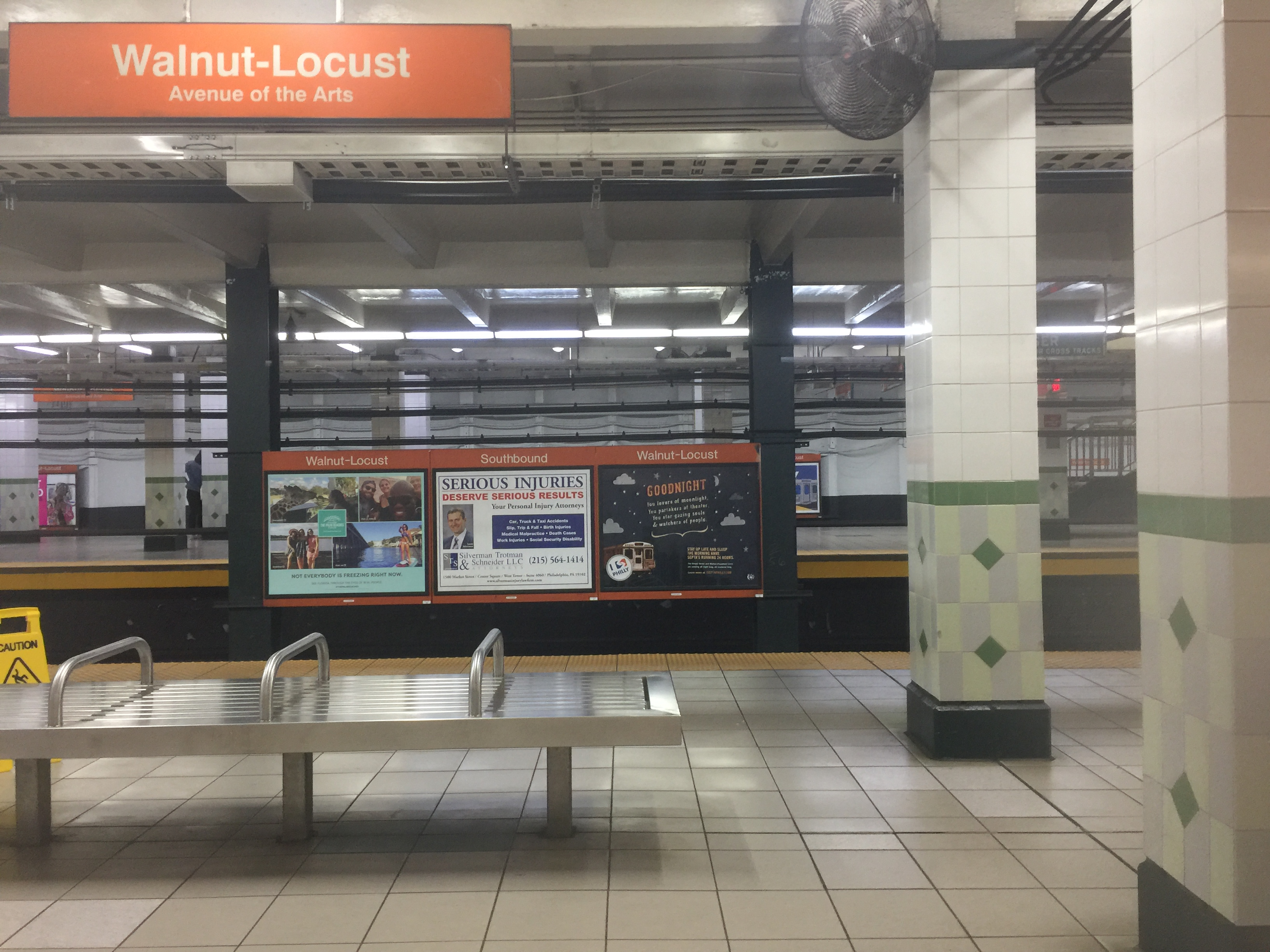
Platform signage

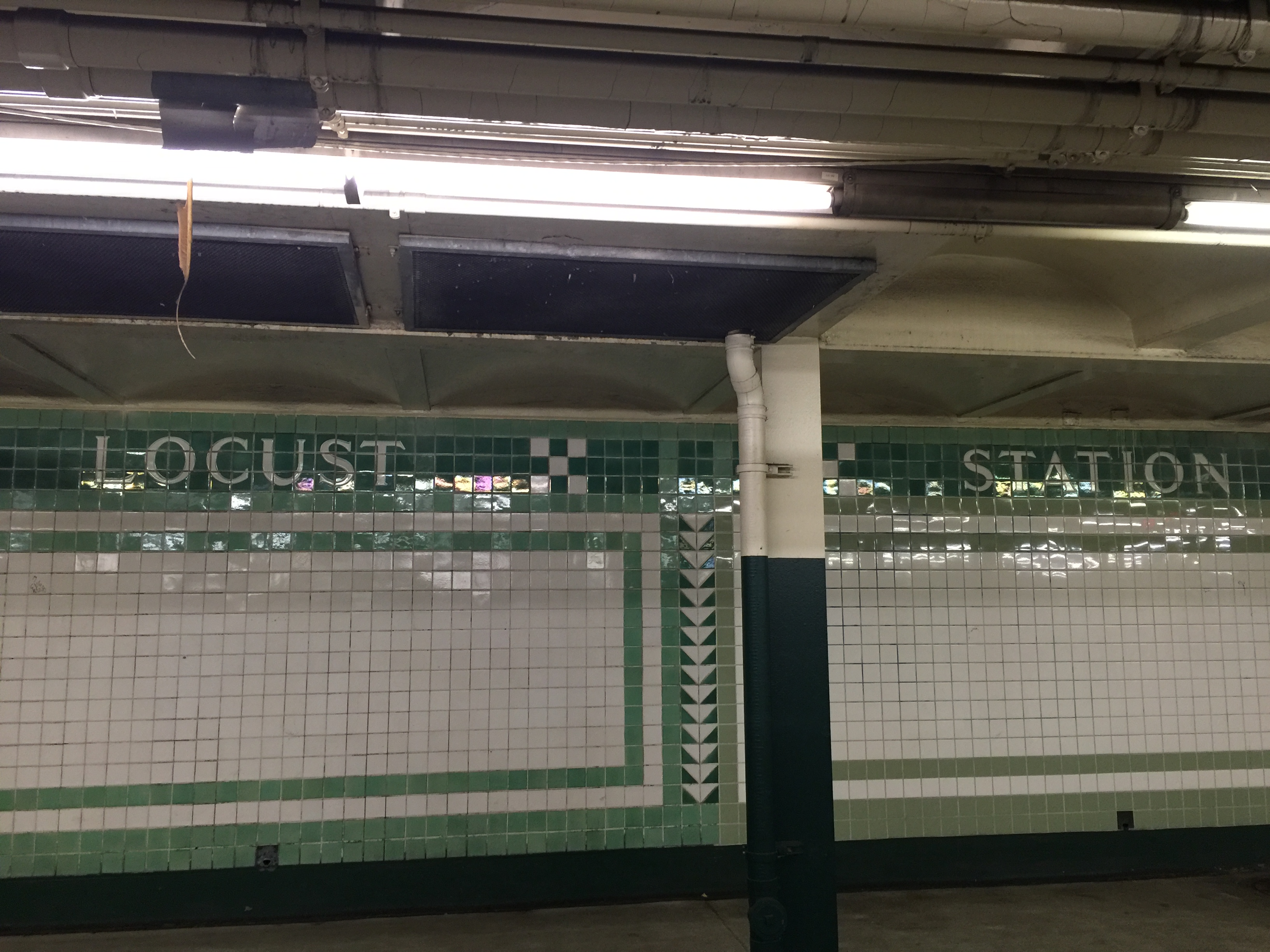
Tile work at the station

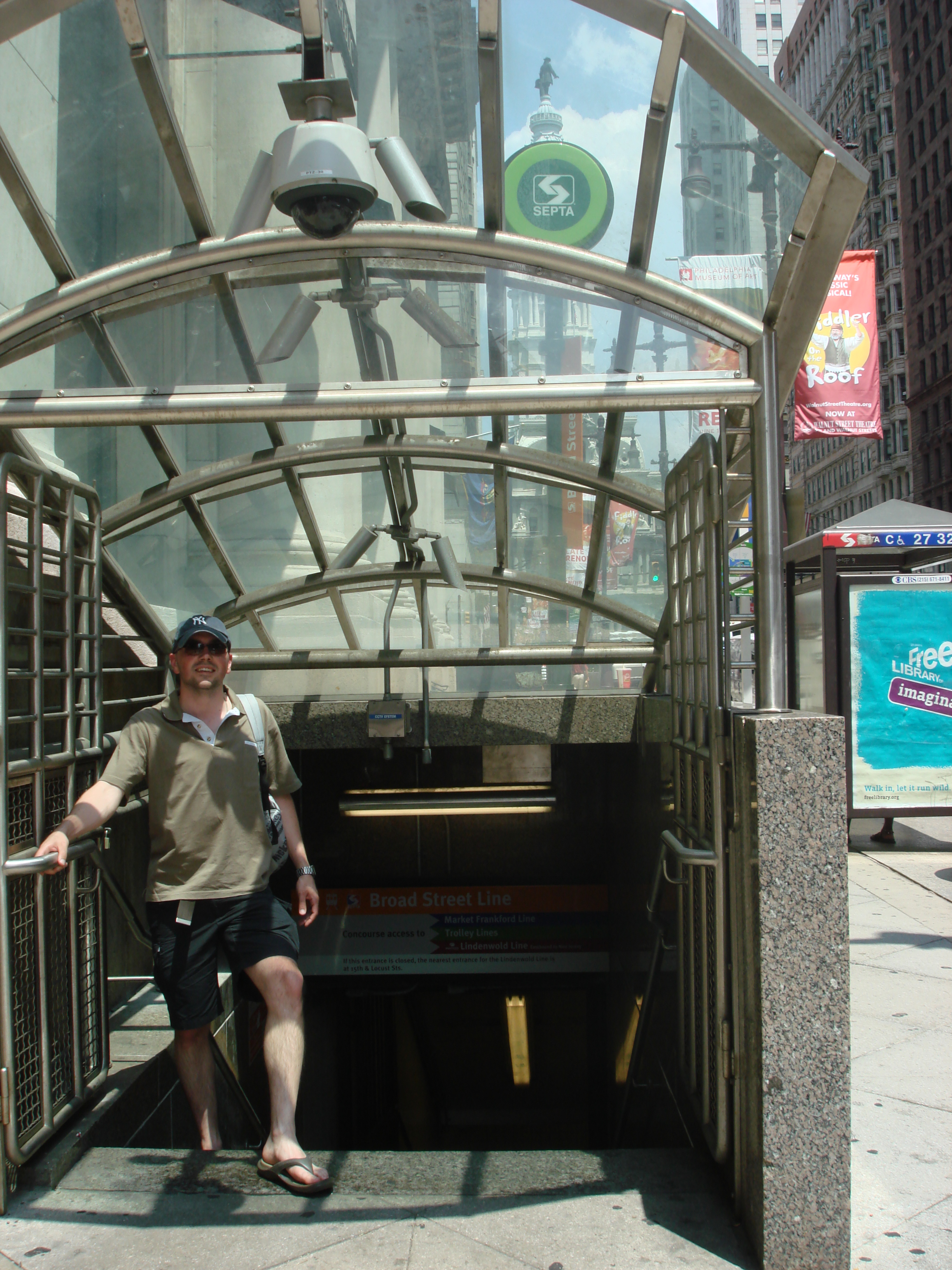
Entrance from the northwest corner of Walnut Street and South Broad Street.

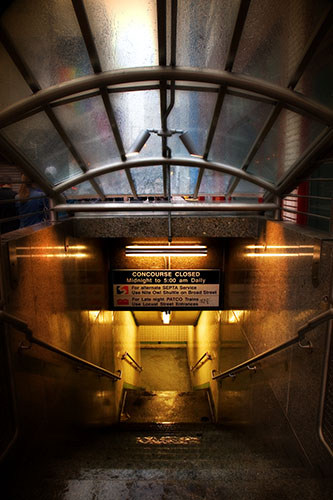
Station entrance via the South Broad Street concourse

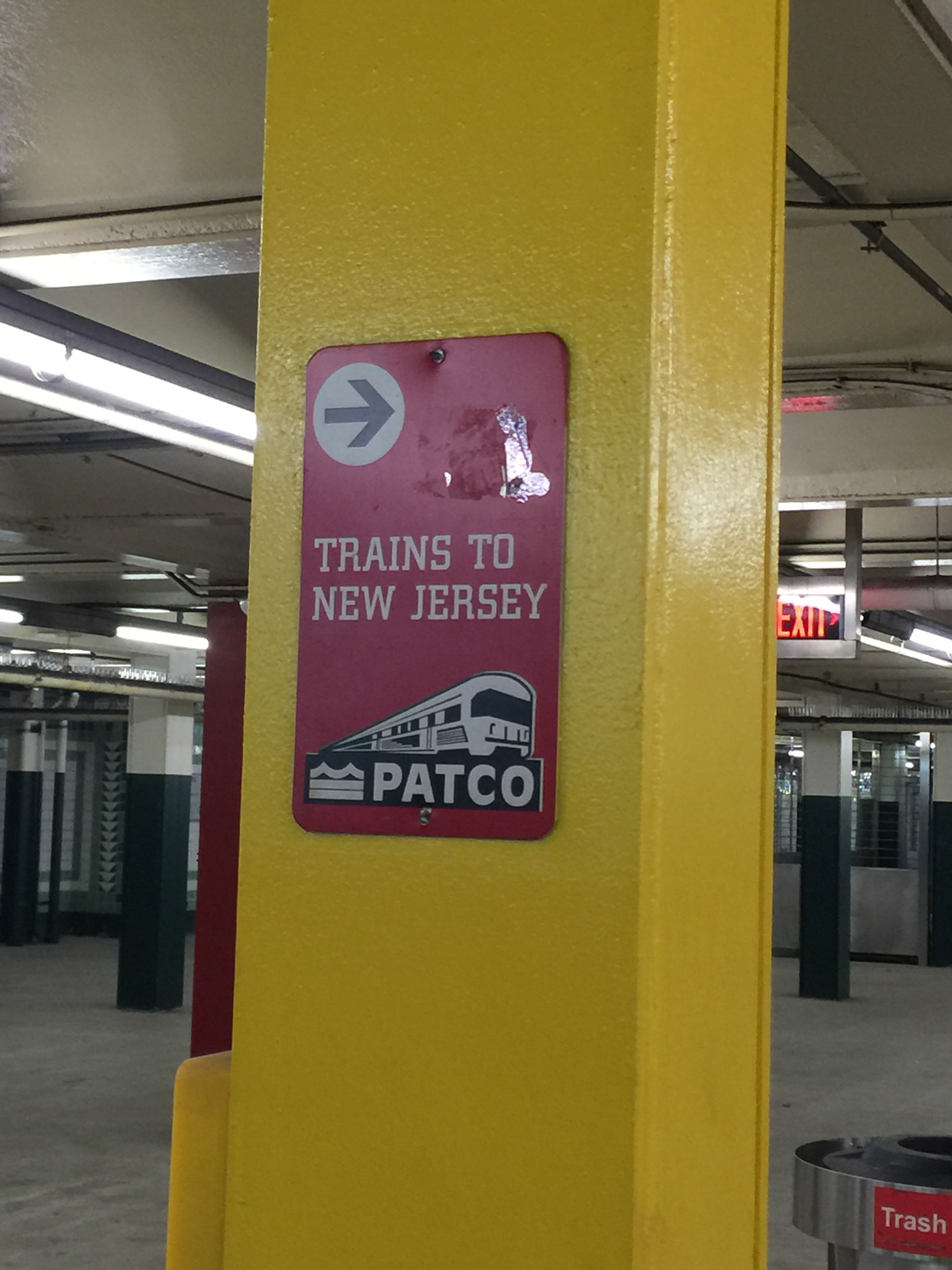
Signs pointing towards PATCO trains

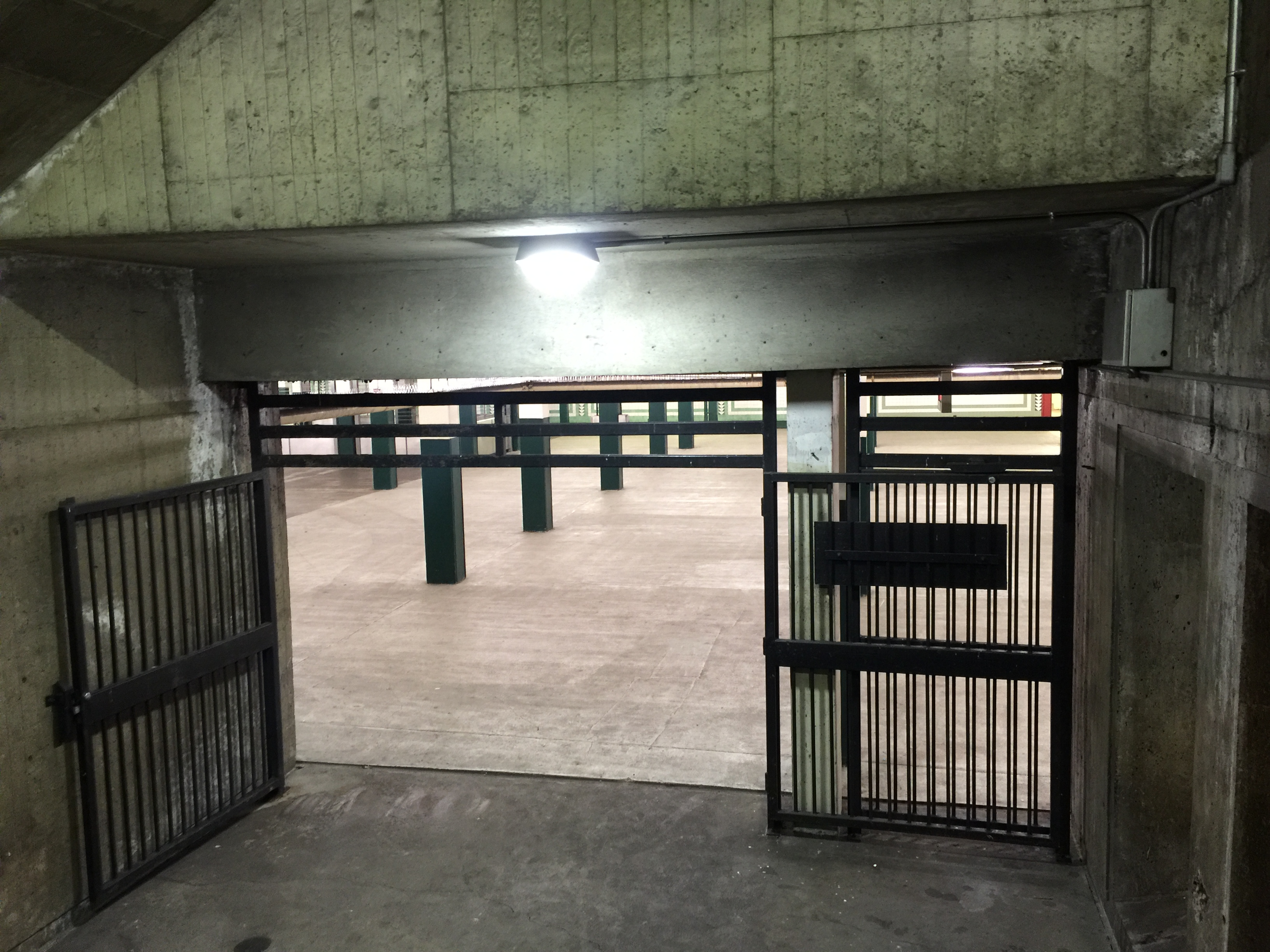
Entrance to station complex at Broad and Locust

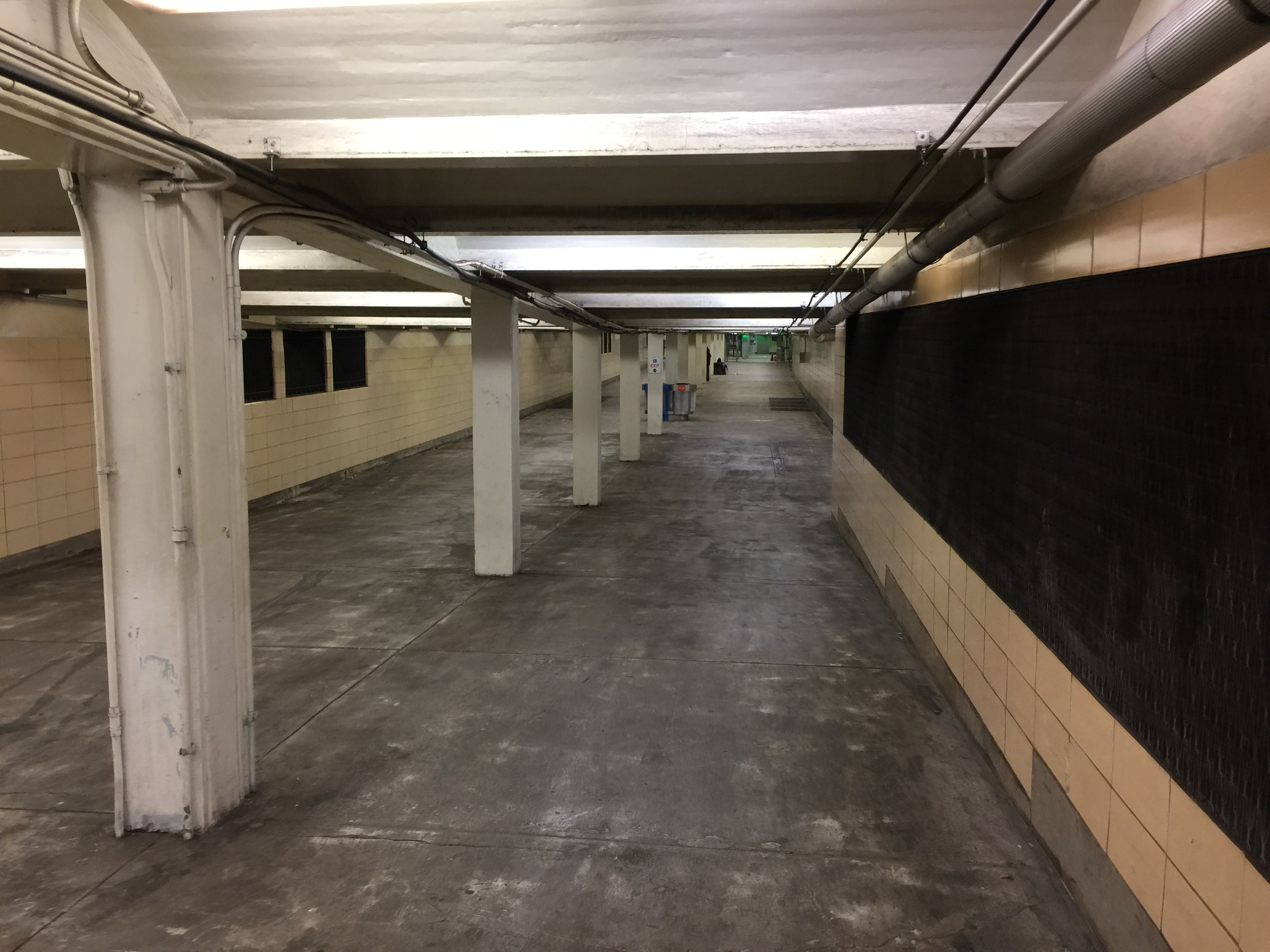
Transfer tunnel to PATCO trains

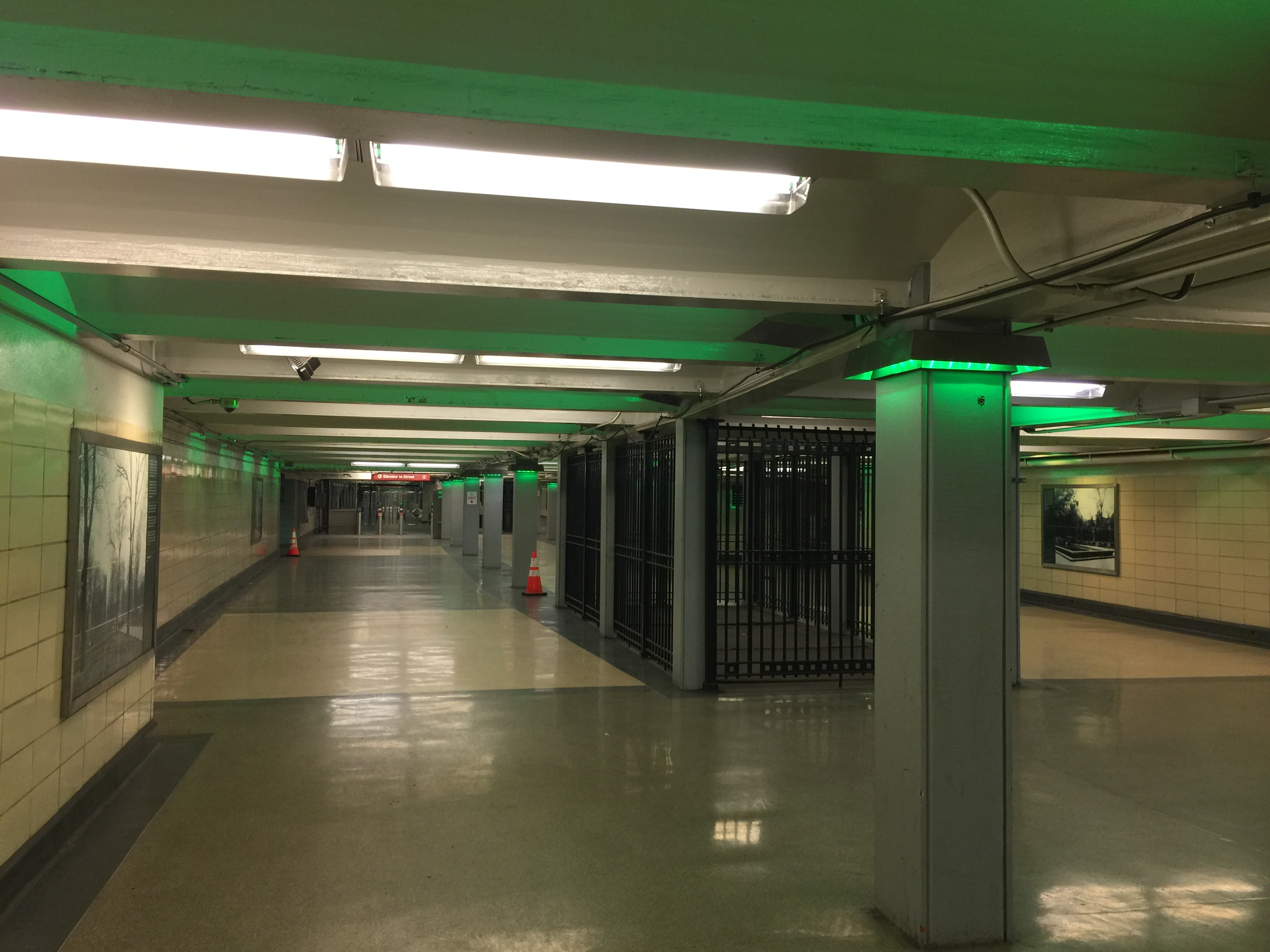
PATCO mezzanine at 15-16 and Locust
