= Freedom Card =

Public transit smart card used in Philadelphia

- Location: Philadelphia and South Jersey
- Launched: 2007
- Technology: Contactless smart card by Cubic Transportation Systems, Inc.
- Manager: PATCO
- Currency: US $
- Stored-value: Pay as you go
- Credit expiry: 10 years (balance transferable)
- Auto recharge: Autoload replenishment
- Validity: PATCO Speedline; PATCO station parking fees; SEPTA Transit Routes (Freedom Share card only)
- Retailed: Service centers; Vending machines
- Variants: Freedom Share Card; Transit Benefit Card (T-Card)
- Website: patcofreedomcard.org

The Freedom Card, stylized as FREEDOM Card, is a contactless smartcard fare collection system used by the PATCO Speedline in New Jersey and Philadelphia.

== Technology ==
The chip embedded in the card is a MIFARE DESFire EV1 with 4kb of storage, manufactured by NXP Semiconductors. Because it uses a common communication standard, the card serial number and manufacturing date can be read by modern smartphones that advertise support for near field communication. Balance/trip data stored on the card is encrypted and cannot be read by non-PATCO equipment.

Ever since SEPTA introduced the SEPTA Key card as its preferred mode of fare collection, efforts to integrate these two automated systems have been ongoing. The main technical challenge is that traditional Freedom Cards store balance value on the card itself, while Key cards rely on a centralized account-based system. PATCO has introduced Freedom Share cards that rely on a similar system and can hence be used on all SEPTA transit routes (but not the SEPTA Regional Rail), in addition to the Speedline itself. There are also plans to integrate the fare payment of the NJ Transit's River Line.

== Operation ==
Freedom cards are available for $5 at vending machines at PATCO stations, and require a minimum of $20 loaded onto the card at the time of purchase. Freedom Share cards can only be purchased at the service centers at Broadway and Woodcrest stations (after filling out an application form), and can be replenished via all existing methods. PATCO has also set up a website to allow users to do this online. Due to the introduction of these cards, the sale of SEPTA tickets and discounted transfers from vending machines at PATCO stations was ended on September 30, 2018.

When entering a station, cardholders are required to tap their card at the fare gate to gain access to the boarding area. To exit, cardholders are required to tap their card again at their destination. The system immediately calculates the total fare and subtracts it from the balance of the card. If the card has insufficient funds to pay for the fare, the rider will be prompted to visit a vending machine behind the gate to reload value on the card before being allowed to exit. When Freedom Share cards are used on SEPTA transit, the standard $2.90 fare is deducted.
