= 12–13th & Locust station =

Rapid transit station in Philadelphia

12–13th & Locust
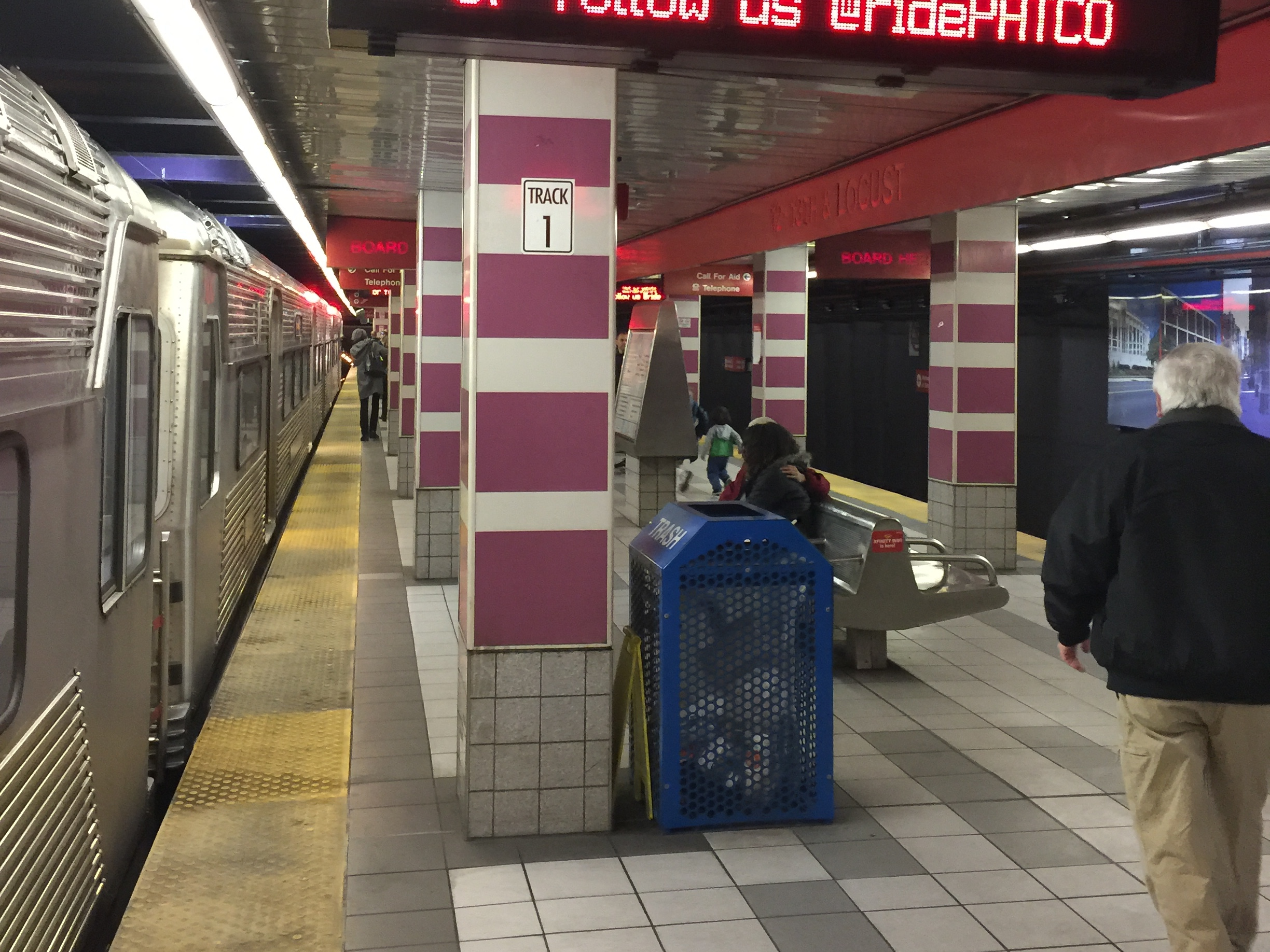
- 12–13th & Locust station platform in 2018

General information
- Location: 12th and Locust Streets; Philadelphia, Pennsylvania, U.S.
- Coordinates: 39°56′52″N 75°09′39″W
- Owner: City of Philadelphia
- Operator: Delaware River Port Authority
- Platforms: 1 island platform
- Tracks: 2
- Connections: (at Walnut–Locust); SEPTA City Bus: 2, 12

Construction
- Cycle facilities: Racks
- Accessible: Yes

History
- Opened: February 15, 1953

Passengers
- 2025: 704 (average weekday)
- Rank: 12 of 14

Services
Preceding station	DRPA	Following station
15–16th & Locust Terminus	PATCO Speedline	9–10th & Locust toward Lindenwold
Location

12–13th & Locust station is a PATCO Speedline subway station at 12th and Locust Streets in the Washington Square West neighborhood of the Center City Philadelphia. The station has a single island platform with a fare mezzanine above. The mezzanine level connects to the Center City Pedestrian Concourse.

Construction work to make the station accessible, including street to mezzanine and mezzanine to platform elevators, began in October 2020.
