= PATCO Speedline =

Rapid transit system in New Jersey and Pennsylvania

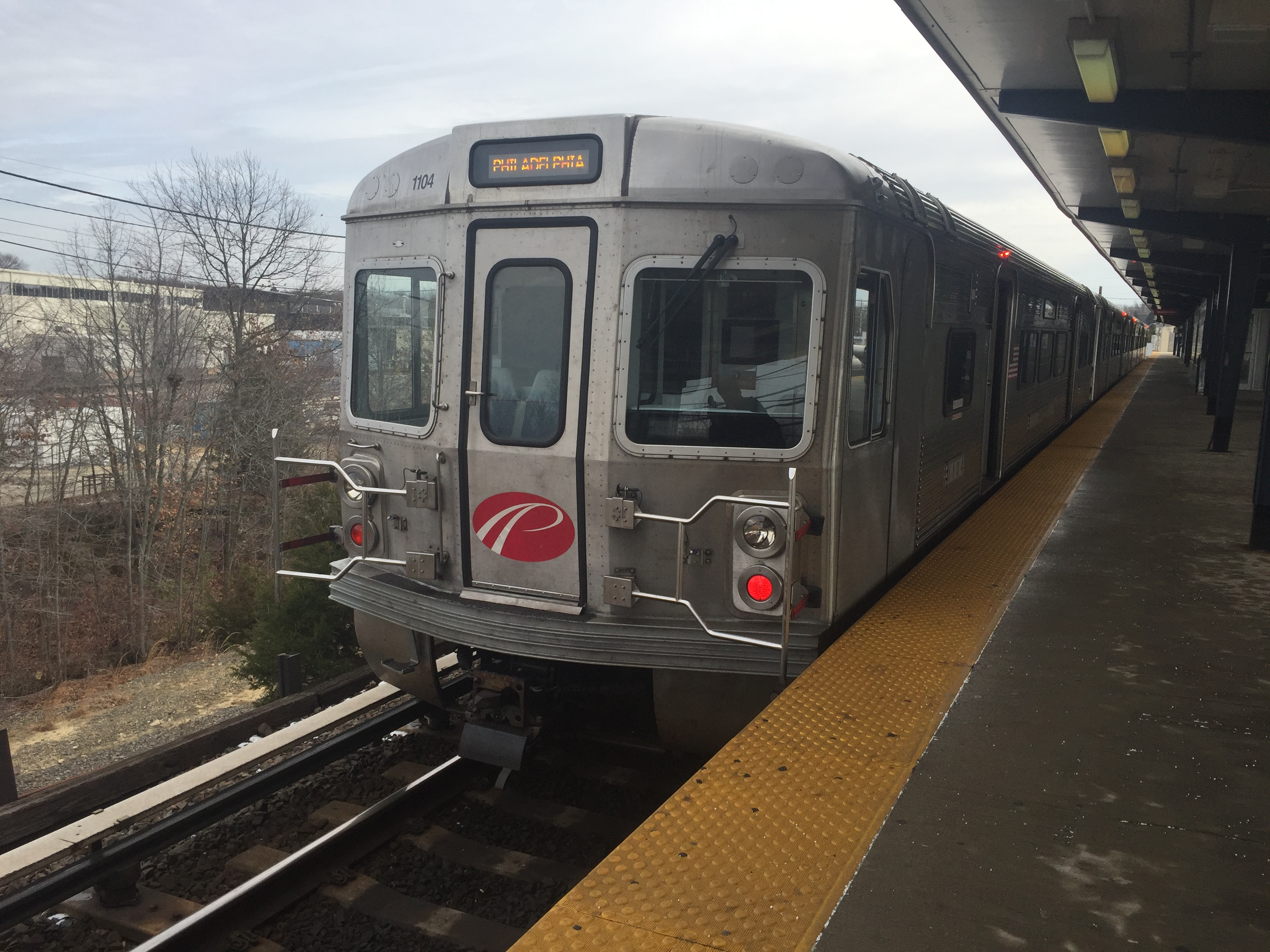
- PATCO Speedline train at the Lindenwold station in 2017

Overview
- Owner: Delaware River Port Authority
- Locale: Philadelphia, Pennsylvania, and Camden County, New Jersey
- Termini: 15–16th & Locust; Lindenwold
- Stations: 14
- Website: ridepatco.org

Service
- Type: Rapid transit
- Operator: Port Authority Transit Corporation
- Rolling stock: 120 electric multiple units
- Daily ridership: 19,800 (weekdays, Q2 2026)
- Ridership: 5,865,800 (2025)

History
- Opened: 1936 (as the Bridge Line) January 4, 1969 (as the PATCO Speedline)

Technical
- Line length: 14.2 mi (22.9 km)
- Number of tracks: 2
- Character: Underground, surface, and elevated (grade separated)
- Track gauge: 4 ft 8 1/2 in (1,435 mm) standard gauge
- Electrification: Third rail, 750 V DC
- Operating speed: 30 mph (48 km/h) (avg.); 65 mph (105 km/h) (top)
Route map
- Sources

The PATCO Speedline, signed as the Lindenwold Line in Philadelphia and commonly referred to as the PATCO High Speed Line, is a rapid transit route operated by the Port Authority Transit Corporation (PATCO), connecting Philadelphia, Pennsylvania, with Lindenwold in Camden County, New Jersey.

The line runs underground in Philadelphia, crosses the Delaware River on the Benjamin Franklin Bridge, continues underground through Downtown Camden, and then operates predominantly at grade or on elevated track between Camden and Lindenwold. Both PATCO and the Speedline are owned and operated by the Delaware River Port Authority. Service began on January 4, 1969, between Lindenwold and Camden, with full service to Philadelphia commencing on February 15, 1969. The Speedline integrates the historic Bridge Line, originally opened in 1936 between Philadelphia and Broadway Station in Camden, with newly constructed infrastructure along a former commuter rail corridor between Camden and Lindenwold.

While the PATCO Speedline is typically one of the few U.S. mass transit systems to operate 24 hours a day, (Note: The others are the New York City Subway, Staten Island Railway, the Red and Blue Lines of the Chicago "L", and the PATH system.) weekday overnight service is temporarily suspended between September 2025 and August 2026. In 2025, the line recorded 5,865,800 total rides, or about 19,800 per weekday in the second quarter of 2026.

== History ==
=== Crossing the Delaware ===
The present-day PATCO Speedline follows the path of several 19th-century railroads that once terminated at a station in Camden on the bank of the Delaware River, where passengers would transfer to a ferry to reach Philadelphia. In 1919, the states of Pennsylvania and New Jersey formed the Delaware River Bridge Commission to build a fixed crossing between the two cities.

The result was the Delaware River Bridge—later renamed the Benjamin Franklin Bridge—which opened on July 1, 1926. The bridge was designed with two outboard structures beside the main roadway to carry rapid transit tracks, along with six vehicle lanes and two streetcar tracks on the main deck, although no streetcars ever ran across the bridge and the space was eventually converted to additional vehicle lanes.

=== Bridge Line ===
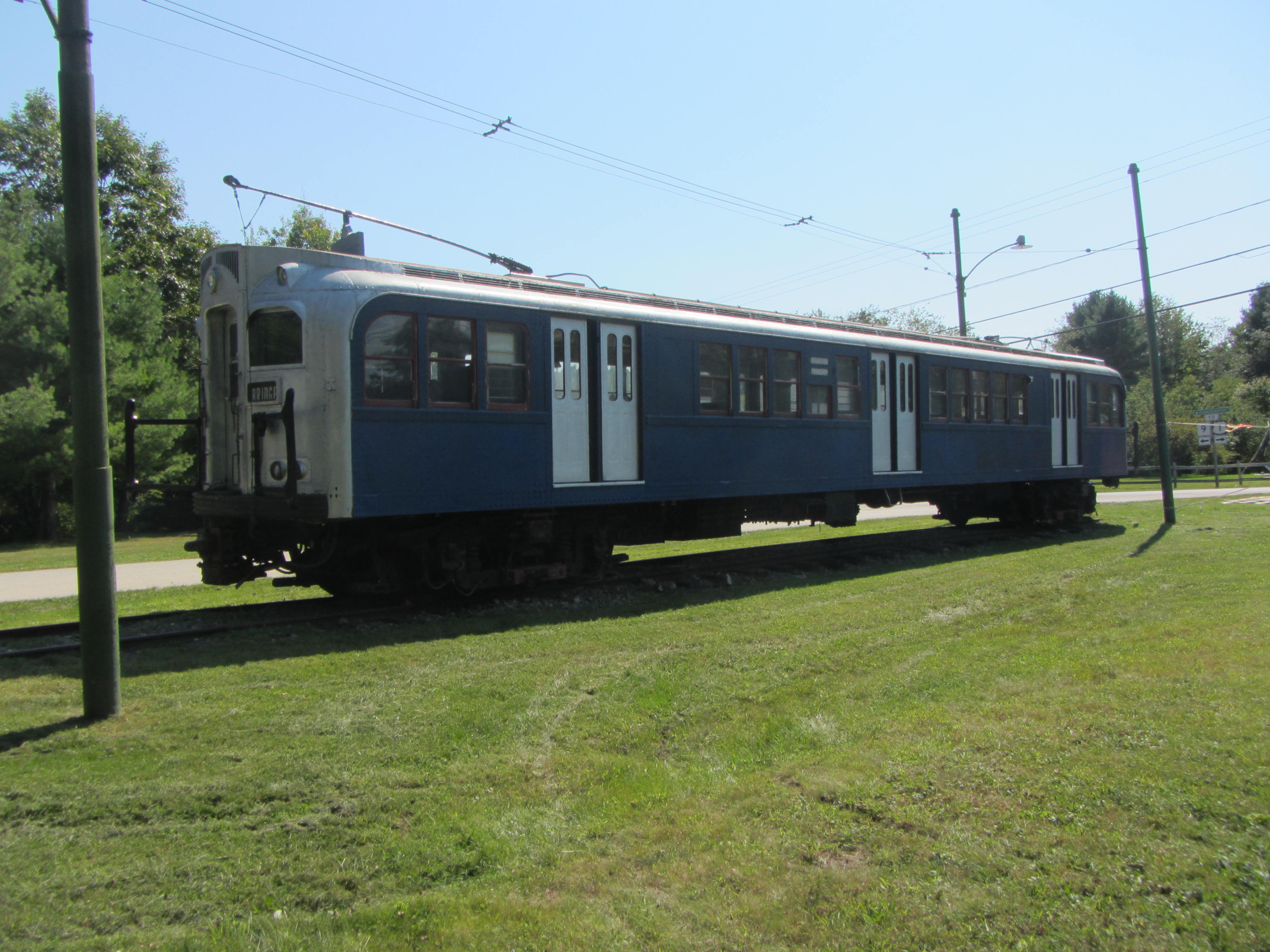
An original Bridge Line car preserved at the Seashore Trolley Museum in Kennebunkport, Maine

To make use of the bridge's rail capacity, the South Jersey Transit Commission, established in 1929, proposed a rapid transit line that would run along the outboard structures. Instead of transferring to a ferry, passengers arriving in Camden could transfer at Broadway station to this new rail line and ride directly to 8th–Market station in Philadelphia, where they could continue on the Market–Frankford Line or the Broad–Ridge Line. The platform at 8th–Market would be shared with the Broad–Ridge Line and had actually been constructed in 1917 as part of an unrealized Center City subway loop. The commission also recommended consolidating regional rail operations, which led to the formation of the Pennsylvania–Reading Seashore Lines, serving Broadway station. However, the Pennsylvania Railroad did not discontinue its ferry service until March 31, 1952.

In 1931, the Delaware River Bridge Commission was reorganized as the Delaware River Joint Commission (DRJC), which was given the authority to build a high-speed transit line. Construction on the new line began in 1932, and the Bridge Line officially opened on June 7, 1936, with four stations: 8th–Market and Franklin Square in Philadelphia, and City Hall and Broadway in Camden. The DRJC owned the line and contracted with the Philadelphia Rapid Transit Company to operate it. Following the operator's bankruptcy, the reorganized Philadelphia Transportation Company (PTC) assumed control in 1940. In June 1949, to lower operating costs, PTC began through-routing Bridge Line trains with the Broad–Ridge Line, reversing direction at 8th–Market and offering one-seat service between Camden and Broad–Girard station in North Philadelphia.

=== Locust Street Subway ===
As part of the earlier subway loop plans, the City of Philadelphia had begun tunneling from 8th Street to Locust Street, then west along Locust to 16th Street. Construction began in 1917 but was halted by World War I, resumed briefly in 1931, and was again suspended due to the Great Depression. Work finally resumed in 1950, and on February 14, 1953, the Bridge Line was extended to 15–16th & Locust station, with intermediate stops at 12–13th & Locust and 9–10th & Locust. The Broad–Ridge Line would also use the same tracks. This extension, still owned by the City of Philadelphia, marked the last major addition to the Bridge Line before its transformation.

Despite the extension, the Bridge Line suffered from low ridership due to high fares and its failure to extend into the South Jersey suburbs. By January 1954, off-peak and Saturday service was cut back to operate only between Girard and Camden, with a shuttle train running between 8th and 16th stations. Sunday service west of 8th Street was suspended entirely due to minimal demand. By 1962, only 1,900 passengers used the western segment of the line daily.

=== Conversion to the PATCO Speedline ===
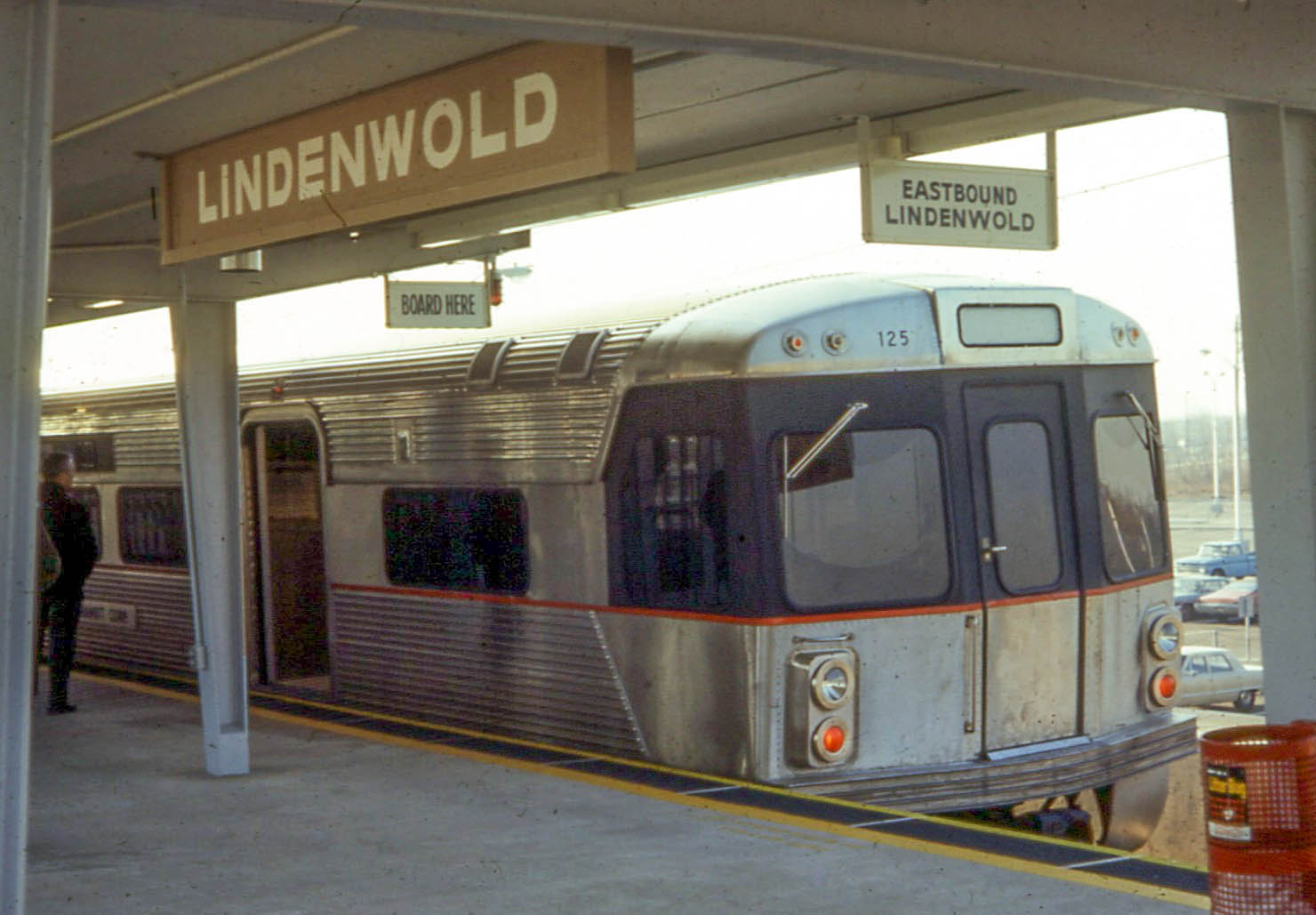
A train at the Lindenwold station in Lindenwold, New Jersey, on the first day of service in January 1969

From the time the Bridge Line opened, local advocacy groups called for a more comprehensive transit system linking Camden to South Jersey suburbs. In 1951, the states of Pennsylvania and New Jersey established the Delaware River Port Authority (DRPA) to succeed the DRJC and expand its mandate to regional transportation planning. To operate the transportation service, the DRPA established the Port Authority Transit Corporation (PATCO).

To chart a path forward, the DRPA commissioned Parsons, Brinckerhoff, Hall & MacDonald to study possible high-speed transit corridors. Their plan recommended constructing three new lines in South Jersey: Route A to Moorestown, Route B to Lindenwold/Kirkwood, and Route C to Woodbury Heights that would feed into a new tunnel under the Delaware River at an estimated cost of $242 million (equivalent to $2.6 billion in 2025).

A later study by Louis T. Klauder & Associates proposed a more cost-effective alternative: reusing the existing Bridge Line to reach Philadelphia and extending service east along the former Pennsylvania–Reading Seashore Lines corridor to Lindenwold (Route B) as it had the highest projected ridership. This reduced the projected cost to $94 million (equivalent to $1.0 billion in 2025), ultimately shaping the system that was built.

Over the weekend of August 23–27, 1968, the Broad–Ridge Line was realigned to a new upper-level terminal platform, becoming the Broad–Ridge Spur, which allowed conversion of the lower-level platforms into a high-speed service. During the conversion period, service was split between 16th–8th Street and 8th Street–Camden, with a cross-platform transfer at 8th. Bridge Line service was suspended on December 29, 1968, for final conversion of the line. Service from Lindenwold to Camden began on January 4, 1969. Full service into Center City Philadelphia over the Benjamin Franklin Bridge commenced on February 15, 1969, officially inaugurating the PATCO Speedline. The final cost of the project was $92 million.

An infill park and ride station, Woodcrest, was added on February 1, 1980, coinciding with the introduction of the PATCO II railcars. Subsequently, Ferry Avenue Local trains were replaced with Woodcrest Local trains on September 20, 1980.

In 2005, PATCO officials initiated plans for a new route along the corridor originally proposed for Route C, intended to serve Gloucester County and terminate in Glassboro on the campus of Rowan University. On May 12, 2009, New Jersey Governor Jon Corzine formally endorsed the development of a diesel light rail system along an existing Conrail right-of-way. This alignment was selected for its lower capital and operating costs. The proposed Glassboro–Camden Line would require passengers to transfer to the Speedline at the Walter Rand Transportation Center (Broadway station) for service to Philadelphia.

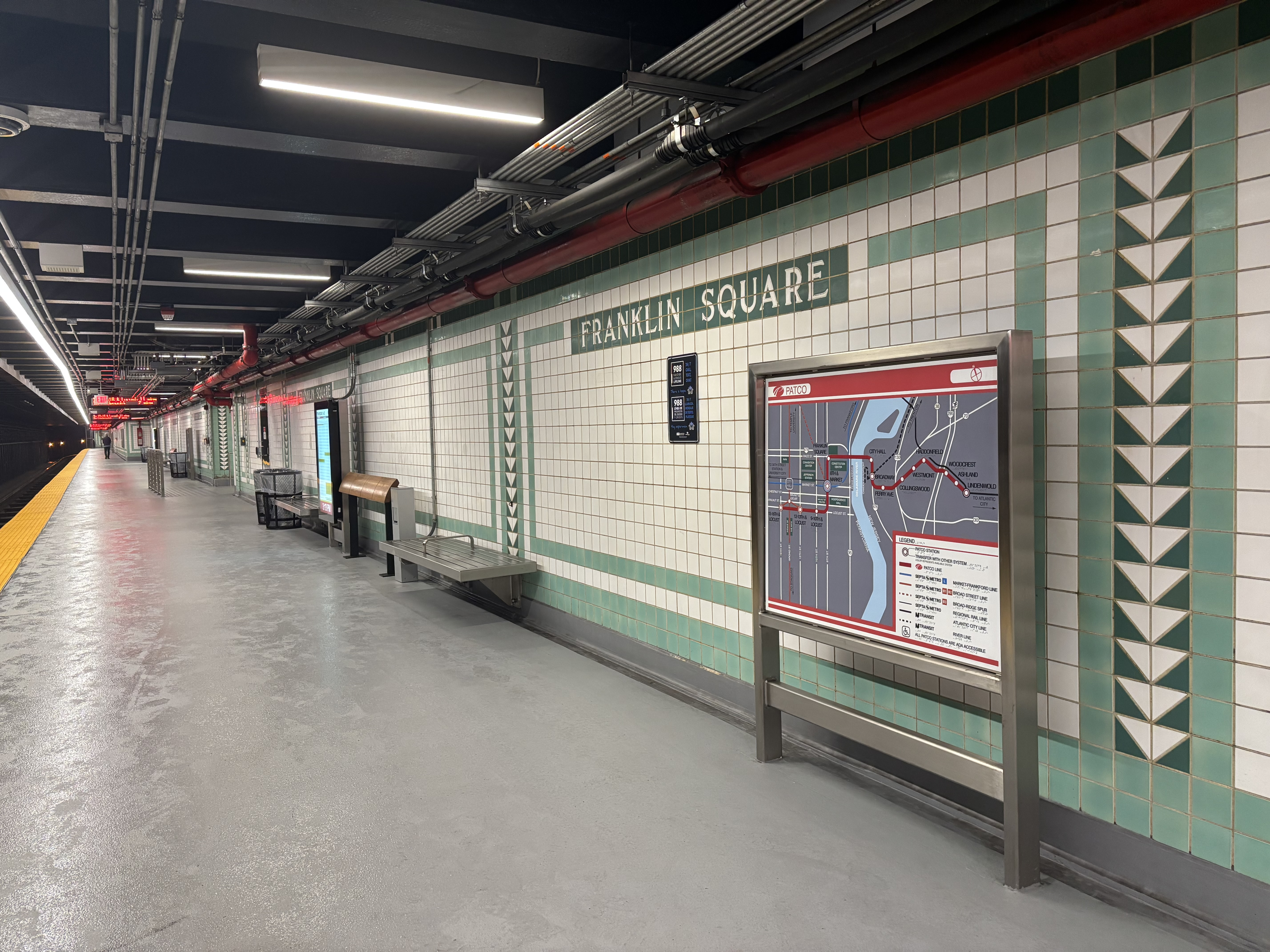
The renovated Franklin Square station shortly after reopening in 2025, after being closed since 1979

Franklin Square station, originally constructed in 1936 and closed since 1979, was proposed for reopening in the early 2000s. The $29.3 million renovation, got underway in 2022 and updated the station to modern standards and accessibility with a surface structure built at Franklin Square. The station reopened on April 3, 2025.

In 2021, the City of Philadelphia proposed a westward expansion of the PATCO system to the rapidly growing University City district. The plan includes a new rail tunnel beneath the Schuylkill River, with the 40th Street Trolley Portal station identified as a potential western terminus near the University of Pennsylvania and several major hospitals. A proposed connection at Penn Medicine Station would facilitate direct transfers to the SEPTA Regional Rail network. The next phase of the project includes a comprehensive feasibility study and cost analysis.

Due to the COVID-19 pandemic, PATCO implemented limited service beginning March 28, 2020, temporarily bypassing the 12–13th & Locust, City Hall, Westmont, and Ashland stations. All four stations reopened on September 14, 2020. In March 2025, PATCO announced a six-month suspension of overnight service to allow for enhanced cleaning of stations.

== Rolling stock ==
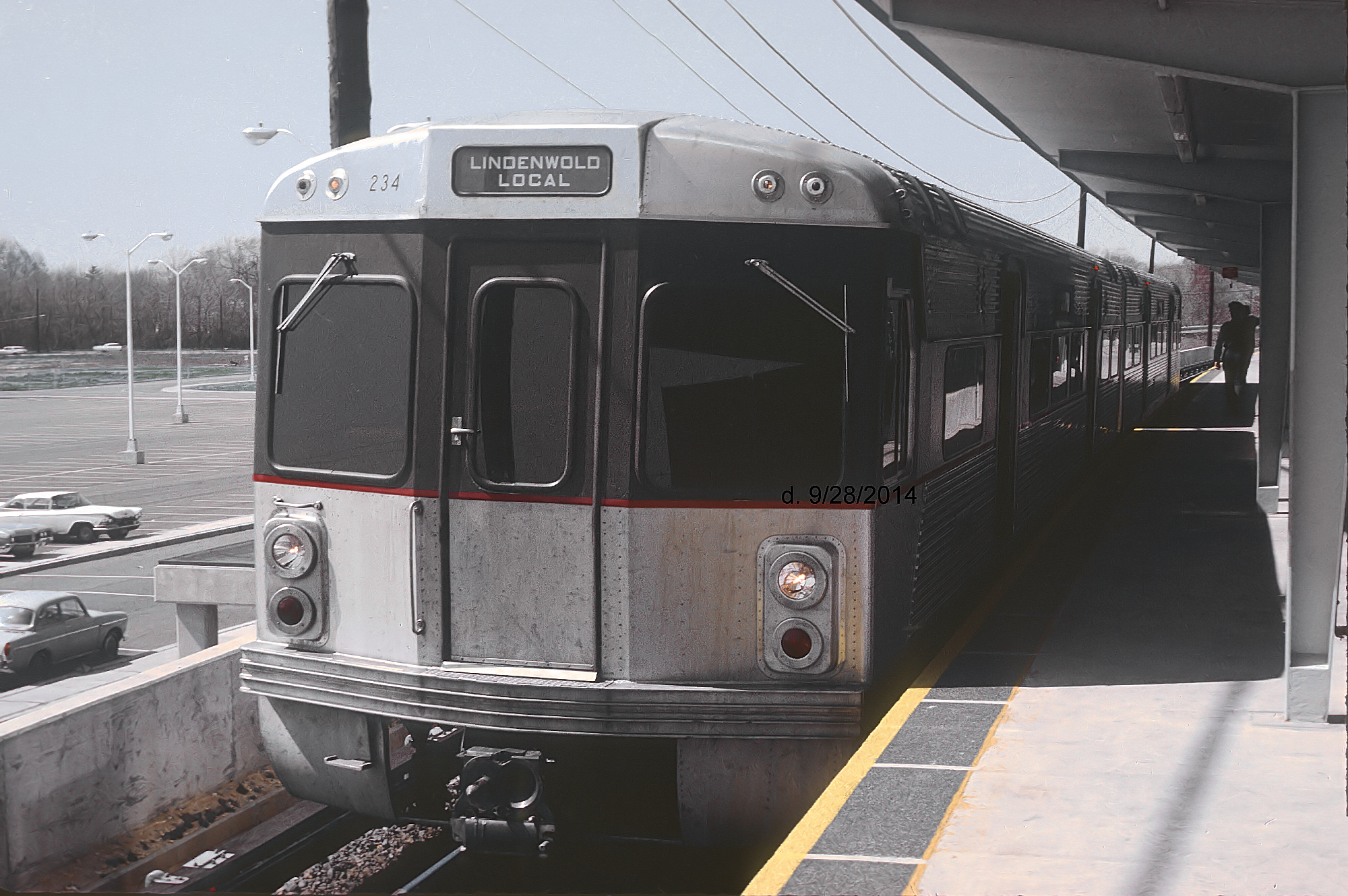
An original PATCO I car at Lindenwold station in 1969

PATCO originally operated a fleet of 121 railcars, each 67 feet (20.42 m) in length, acquired in two orders designated PATCO I and PATCO II.

The PATCO I cars were designed and manufactured by the Budd Company of Philadelphia in 1968. Cars 101–125 were single units, while 201–250 were delivered as permanently coupled married pairs sharing motors motor and automatic train operation (ATO) control systems. Early cars used WABCO Model N-2 MU couplers, later replaced with Tomlinson couplers due to reliability issues. The unreliable electrical systems on PATCO I cars was later upgraded to match the PATCO II cars. Both fleets used camshaft resistance motor controllers and Budd Pioneer III trucks, producing a lightweight but less stable ride. The design informed later railcars, including the Long Island Rail Road's M1 and M3 railcars. Single-unit cars included a single-leaf door behind each cab, intended for onboard fare collection during late-night service before the fare system was finalized.

Delivered in 1980 alongside the opening of the Woodcrest station, the PATCO II cars (numbered 251–296) were manufactured by Vickers Canada under license from Budd. They closely resembled the earlier PATCO I units, with minor differences such as a fixed partition behind the operator's cab and the absence of a stainless steel shroud below the doors, allowing easier maintenance access.

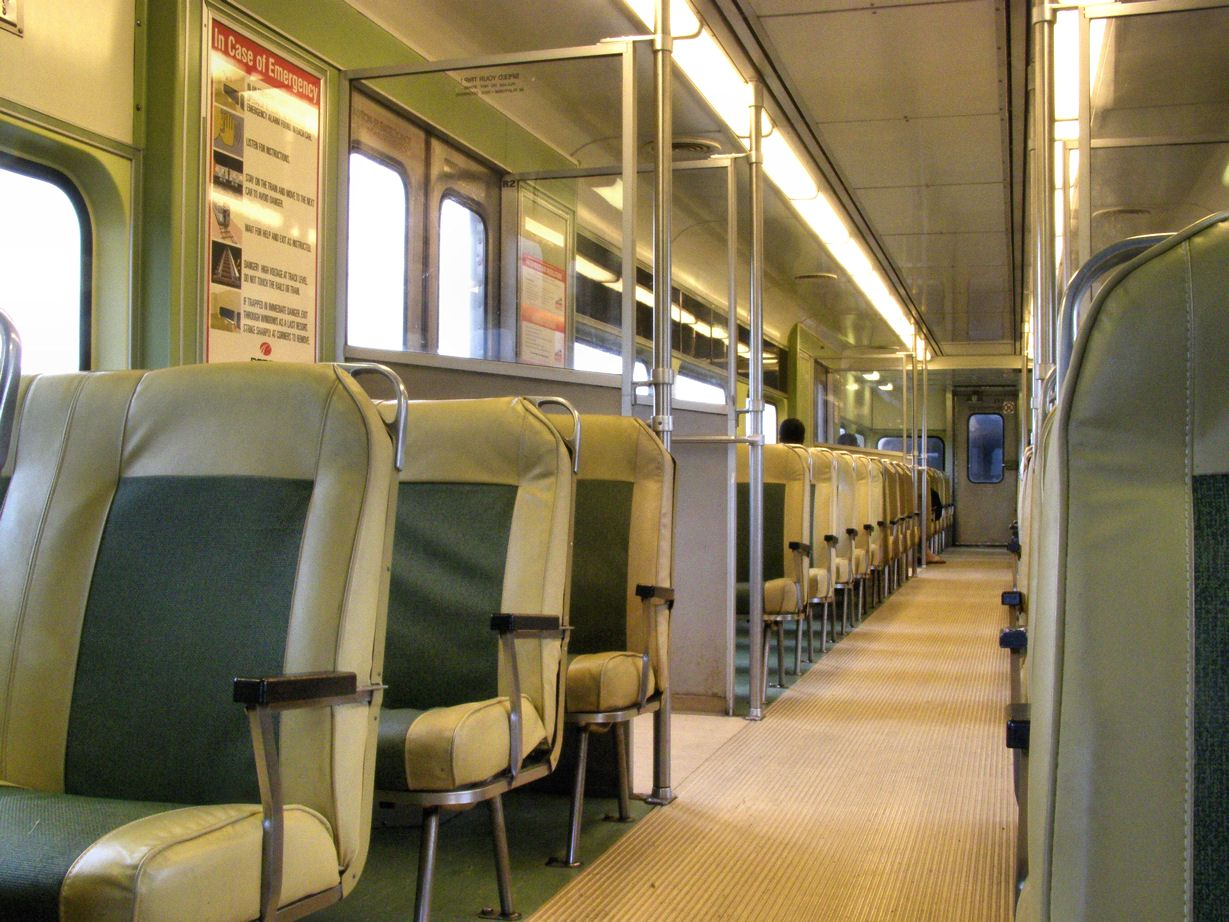
The interior of an original 1968 PATCO car

From 1969 until 2018, PATCO cars retained their original cream-and-avocado green interior, with vinyl seats featuring cloth inserts in a 2+2 layout—half forward-facing, half backward-facing. Vestibule areas were located at each door, with grab handles along seatbacks for standees.

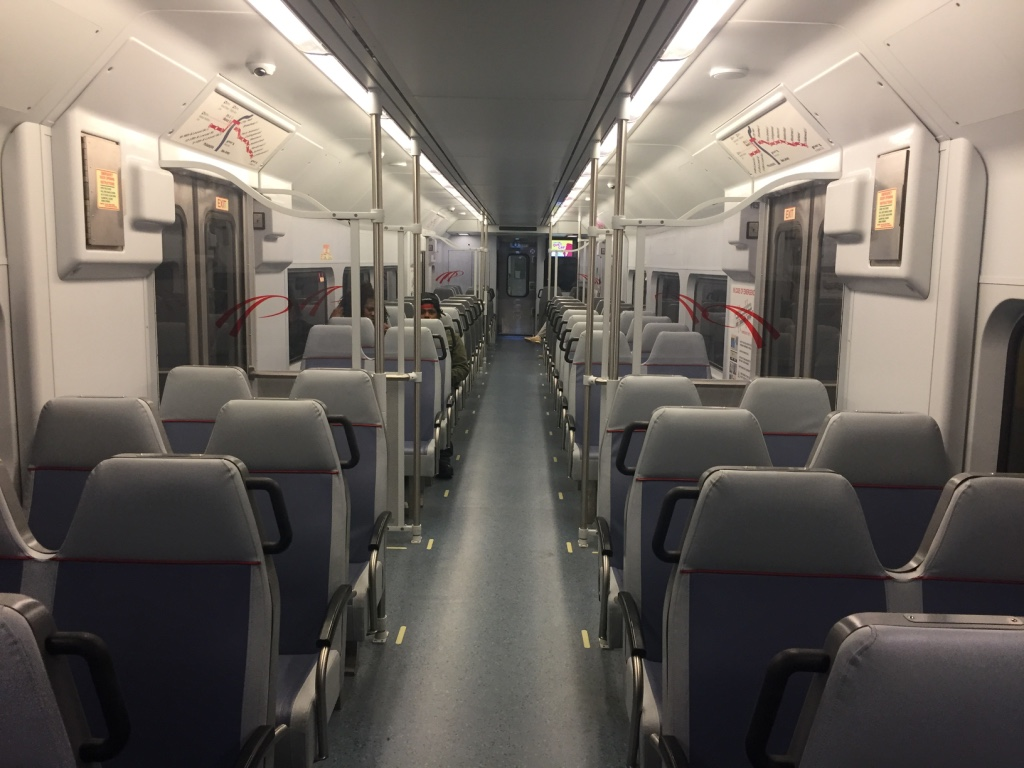
The interior of a rebuilt PATCO car

In 2009, PATCO launched a $194.2 million fleet-wide refurbishment program, awarding the contract to Alstom. Starting in 2011, cars were transported to Alstom's facility in Hornell, New York facility for rebuilding. Updates included modernized interiors with bright white walls, all-vinyl dark gray and navy blue seating, improved fluorescent lighting, updated HVAC systems, wheelchair-accessible areas with folding seats, digital signage, and automated announcements recorded by Bernie Wagenblast. Full-width operator cabs were introduced for enhanced safety, eliminating four passenger seats per car.

Mechanical upgrades included new solid-state propulsion and train control systems, replacing the original camshaft resistance controllers and relay-based ATO. General Electric traction motors and Budd Pioneer III trucks were retained but rebuilt. Additional spare motors were sourced from retired Metro-North M-1A cars.

The first rebuilt cars were delivered in late 2013 and entered service on May 28, 2015. Rebuilt units were renumbered in the 1000 series, with former single units converted into married pairs. The program, intended to extend car life by 20 years, proceeded at a rate of 4–6 cars per month.

The final unrefurbished train made its last run on June 10, 2018, during a public farewell event. By March 2019, 120 of the original 121 cars had been rebuilt. Car 116, damaged beyond repair in a 1997 arson incident, was excluded and used for parts.

== Operation ==
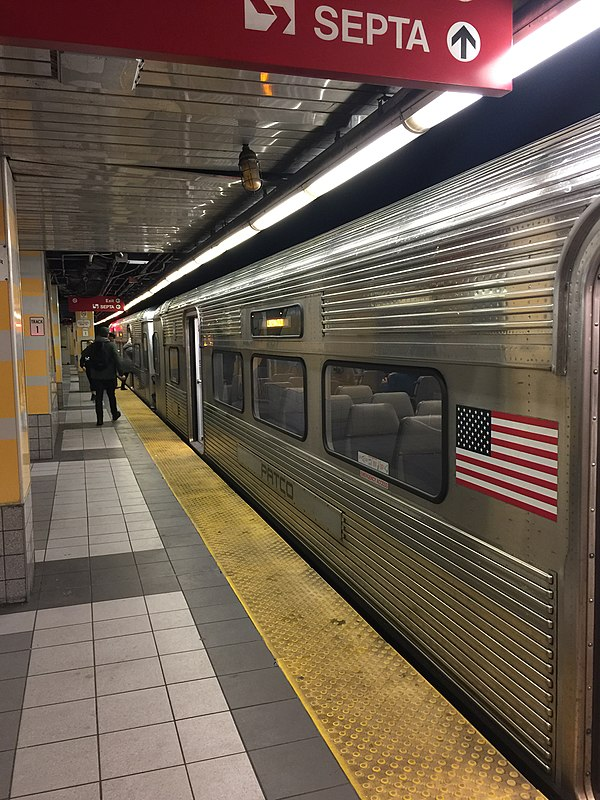
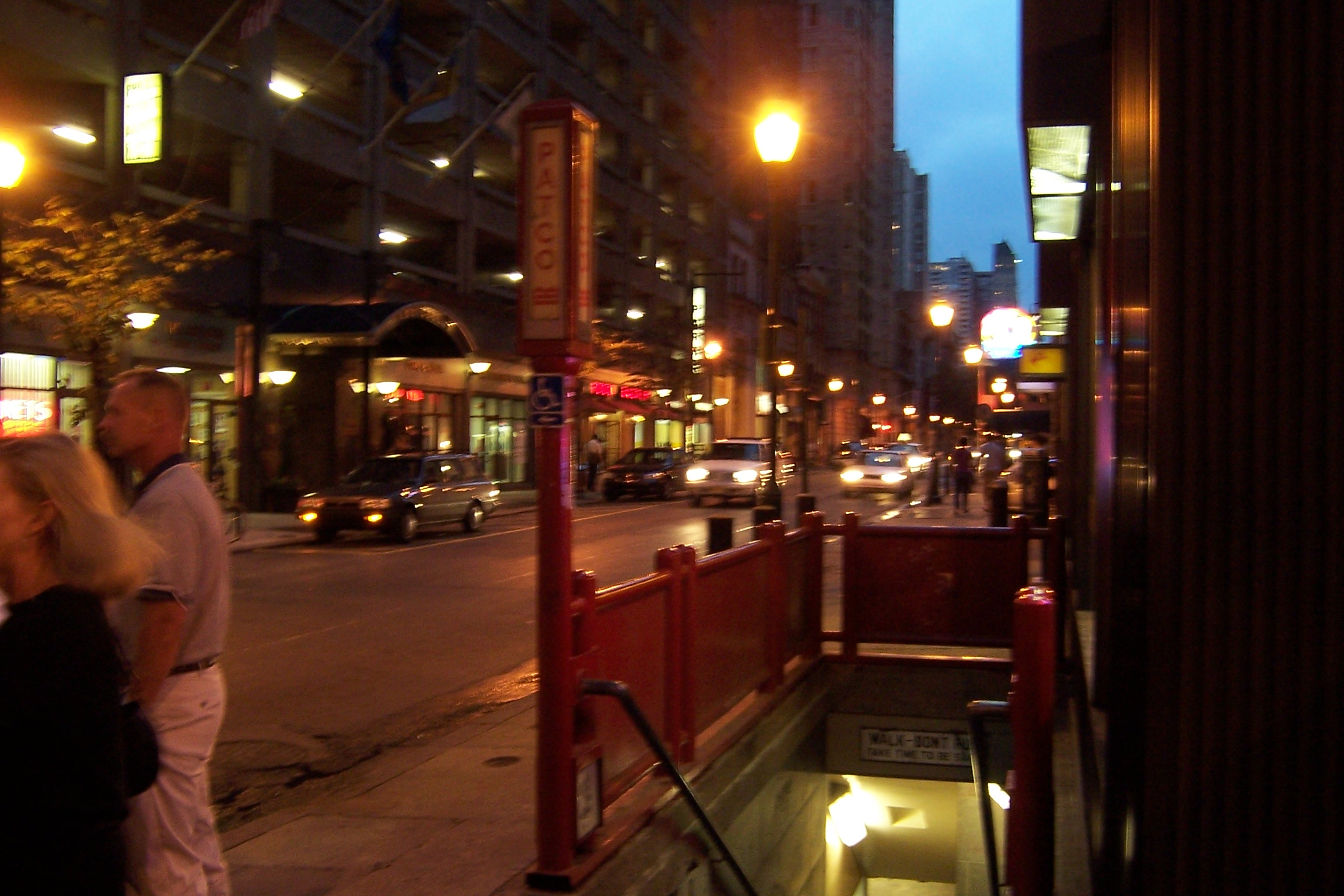
The 15–16th & Locust station in Center City Philadelphia (above), including below ground (left) and the station street exit (right)

PATCO was one of the first transit systems to implement automatic train operation (ATO) in regular service. The system uses an analog architecture based on pulse code cab signaling supplied by Union Switch & Signal. Cab signals transmit one of five speed commands—20 mph (32 km/h), 30 mph (48 km/h), 40 mph (64 km/h), 65 mph (105 km/h) or full stop—which the onboard ATO system responds to by applying maximum acceleration or braking to maintain the target speed. Track-mounted transponders manage automatic station stops, although operators can override these on express trains.

The ATO system struggles in low-adhesion conditions, such as rain or snow, requiring operators to switch to manual control during inclement weather. Operators are also required to operate at least one trip manually per day for proficiency and may opt to run in manual mode at any time. In practice, most prefer automatic operation due to its lower workload and faster run times.

PATCO was designed for one-person operation by utilizing island platforms and having operators sit on the left side of the cab, enabling them to open a window to monitor boarding. At the stations where passengers may board on the side opposite of the operators, mirrors are installed to provide visibility. Operators remain responsible for opening and closing doors, sounding the horn, starting trains from station stops, and taking manual control when needed.

Trains operate at a maximum speed of 65 mph (105 km/h) on surface segments, 40 mph (64 km/h) over the Benjamin Franklin Bridge, and 30 mph (48 km/h) in subway sections. The original maximum speed was 75 mph (121 km/h), but this was reduced to 65 mph (105 km/h) in the 1970s due to excessive wear on the traction motors.

=== Train lengths ===
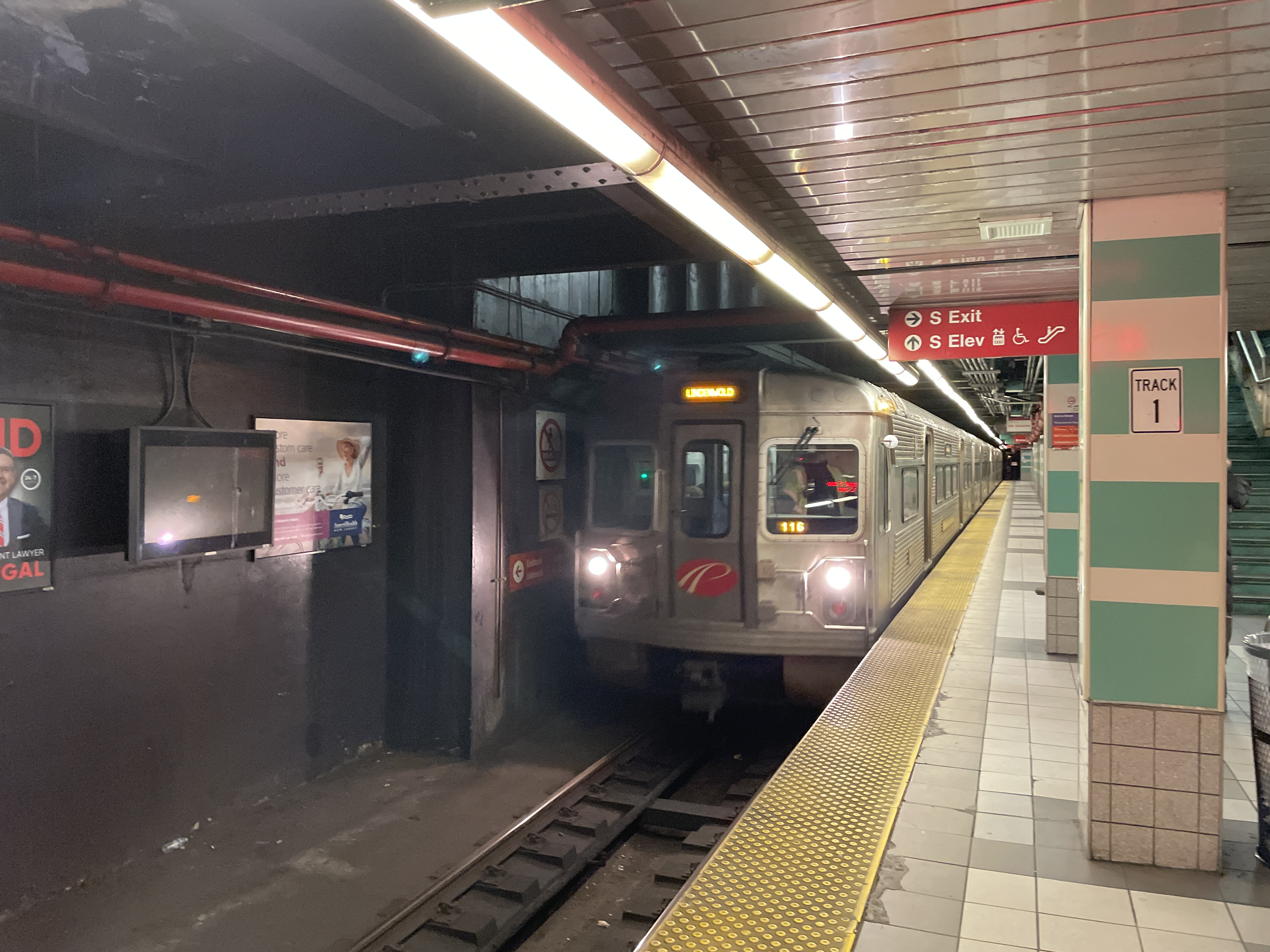
A PATCO train eastbound at 8th and Market station

PATCO typically operates trains in 2-, 4-, or 6-car configurations. Prior to the Alstom fleet rebuild, single-unit trains were occasionally used during late-night hours, while 3- or 5-car trains appeared infrequently, generally due to equipment shortages. Although all stations can accommodate 7- or 8-car trains, these lengths have only been used during testing or for special events such as the annual "Santa Train."

Historically, PATCO adjusted train lengths dynamically in response to ridership, rather than using fixed trainsets. Single-car trains were sometimes operated overnight until the rebuild eliminated single-unit cars. In recent years, service patterns have shifted due to capital improvement projects and reduced mid-day and weekend frequency. As a result, 4- and 6-car trains have become more common during off-peak periods. The COVID-19 pandemic further contributed to this trend, as longer trains were used to support social distancing.

=== Overnight service ===
Since December 2019, late-night service operates with 4-car trains (with doors remaining closed on the front and back cars where the operator is seated) on a 60-minute headway, replacing the previous 45-minute interval. A PATCO police officer is typically present on all trains between 12:00 a.m. and 4:00 a.m. on weekdays, and from 2:00 a.m. to 5:00 a.m. on weekends. Due to low ridership, City Hall station in Camden and 9–10th & Locust and Franklin Square stations in Philadelphia are closed during overnight hours. From September 1, 2025, to approximately March 2026, weekday service between 12:00 midnight and 4:30 a.m. on weekdays was suspended as part of a pilot program to clean and repair the system during the overnight hours. On February 25, 2026, PATCO announced the continuation of the program (and suspension of overnight weekday service) through August 2026.

=== Signaling ===
PATCO trains are governed by a Pulse code cab signaling system which transmits signal codes to the trains via the running rails. Wayside signals are located only at interlockings. Even when the Automatic Train Operation System is not in use, the cab signal speed control function is still enabled and if an operator goes above the permitted speed, the power is cut and the brakes are applied until the speed is back within the limit. The entire PATCO system is run from Center Tower, centrally located above a substation near the Broadway station in Camden. DPRA is constructing a modern control room in Lindenwold Shop and Yard Complex to replace the Center Tower, which will become a backup, at an estimated cost of $19.4 million.

=== Power ===
All PATCO trains are electrically powered. Power comes from a top contact covered third rail at 750 V DC. There are two feeds from the commercial power grid, one located in Philadelphia from PECO Energy for the old Bridge Line tunnel segments and the other in New Jersey from PSE&G for the new mainline segments. In New Jersey power is distributed via wayside AC transmission lines in the 26.4 kV range and a series of 7 substations, located approximately every 2 miles (3.2 km).

== Fare collection ==
PATCO was one of the first transit systems to employ automated fare collection and tickets with magnetically stored data. It uses two types of farecards: reusable contactless smart cards for frequent riders, known as a Freedom Card, and magnetic stripe paper cards, valid for three days. PATCO has five different fare zones, and one must retain one's ticket (or card) to exit the station in the proper zone. There is no discount for using the stored value Freedom Card or multi-ride paper tickets. There are also no unlimited ride pass options, however, a reduced fare Freedom Card is available for senior citizens and disabled riders.

=== Magnetic back tickets (1969–2006) ===
At the start of service in 1969, PATCO used a system of plastic tickets with an oxide layer on the entire back side for the magnetic encoding of data. Tickets were pre-encoded with a number of rides and a destination zone and sold from ticket vending machines in each station. These machines only accepted coins so bill changers were placed in stations to support paper currency. Each ticket vending machine could sell two types of tickets, which the rider chose by pushing a button after inserting the correct fare. Because the system has multiple fare zones, several machines were needed in each station. Stations in New Jersey had machines selling one-way or round-trip tickets to Philadelphia and machines selling tickets to other stations in New Jersey. Ticket machines in Philadelphia would sell single ride tickets to each of the four New Jersey fare zones, with the Camden zone tickets also used for intra-Philadelphia travel. Used tickets with no remaining rides were retained by the faregates, re-encoded at a PATCO facility, and returned for use in the vending machine. Ten-trip tickets could also be purchased through mail order or from ticket windows at select suburban stations.

At its inception, this system was state-of-the-art, but became increasingly problematic as it aged. Tickets were vulnerable to damage from magnetic sources, and the equipment needed to read and code the farecards began to suffer from reliability problems, with little replacement part availability. More importantly, the fare system could not accept payment cards and the reliance on change machines created an extra step for those needing to pay with paper currency.

=== Smart cards (2006–present) ===
In July 2006, PATCO announced that it would start the transition from a magnetic ticket fare system to the Freedom Card, a contactless smart card system designed, built and integrated by Cubic Corporation, the firm responsible for the 1969 magnetic card system. Magnetic tickets are still sold, however, they are now in the form of disposable paper magnetic stripe cards that expire after 3 days. The new computer vending machines support payment cards. Additional ticket vending machines were installed at each station inside of fare control so that if a rider has purchased the wrong fare, they may pay the remaining fare to exit.

=== NFC payments (from 2026) ===
In 2025, PATCO announced plans to roll out an upgraded payment system with contactless payment technology, replacing the Freedom Card. The new system, which will begin in 2026, will allow customers to tap in and out with contactless debit/credit cards and digital wallets on cell phones and smartwatches. The paper magnetic stripe tickets for one-way and round-trip fares will also be phased out in favor of disposable plastic cards that can be tapped at gates. PATCO Freedom Cards and Freedom Share cards will still be accepted, and customers enrolled in reduced fare programs and transit benefits programs will still be required to use their specialty transit benefit Freedom Cards.

== Connections to other transit systems ==
=== NJ Transit connections ===
NJ Transit buses connect to most PATCO stations in New Jersey. The New Jersey Transit Atlantic City Line also stops at Lindenwold Station, and the River Line connects at Broadway Station (Walter Rand Transportation Center).

=== SEPTA connections ===
The SEPTA Metro L connects to PATCO at the 8th & Market Station, which is two blocks away from SEPTA's Jefferson Station, where all but one of SEPTA's Regional Rail trains stop.

The SEPTA Metro B connects to PATCO at the Walnut–Locust station via a short underground walkway to PATCO's 12th–13th & Locust, and 15–16th & Locust stations which has been gated shut since 2020. The B3 spur connects to PATCO at the 8th & Market Station via a pedestrian walkway.

Formerly, a special "SEPTA Transfer" ticket could be purchased from the unpaid side of any New Jersey station. These tickets were sold for $3.50 ($1.75 per ride, a savings compared to a single $2.25 cash fare or a token for $2.00) and dispensed two paper receipts, one good for a ride within one hour of the time of purchase and another good for a ride within 24 hours of the time of purchase. Originally, both transfers were going to be valid for 24 hours, however, PATCO changed the time limit to prevent the unauthorized sale of PATCO transfers at Pennsylvania stations.

With the release of SEPTA Key, a new type of Freedom card, called the Freedom Share Card, is now required to purchase a transfer to the SEPTA system. The Freedom Share Card is compatible with both PATCO Freedom and SEPTA Key card systems, but cannot be used for SEPTA Regional Rail. With this system, the cost of a transfer is the same as the standard SEPTA fare ($2.90), and it is debited directly from the Freedom Share Card account.

== Stations ==
State	Location	Station	Connections	Notes
PA	Center City, Philadelphia	15–16th & Locust	SEPTA Regional Rail (at Suburban Station); SEPTA Metro: (at Walnut–Locust), (at 15th Street/City Hall); SEPTA City Bus: 2, 12, 45 (the 45 at 12-13th Locust)	Access to Downtown Link concourse
PA	Center City, Philadelphia	12–13th & Locust	SEPTA Regional Rail (at Suburban Station); SEPTA Metro: (at Walnut–Locust), (at 15th Street/City Hall); SEPTA City Bus: 2, 12, 45 (the 45 at 12-13th Locust)	Access to Downtown Link concourse
PA	Center City, Philadelphia	9–10th & Locust	SEPTA City Bus: 12	Station closed between approximately 12:05am–4:15am
PA	Center City, Philadelphia	8th & Market	SEPTA Regional Rail (at Jefferson Station); SEPTA Metro: SEPTA City Bus: 17, 33, 44, 47, 48, 61; NJ Transit Bus: 313, 315, 317, 400, 401, 402, 404, 406, 408, 409, 410, 412, 414, 417, 551, 555	
PA	Center City, Philadelphia	Franklin Square	SEPTA Metro: (at Chinatown 'without a concourse'); SEPTA City Bus: 47; NJ Transit Bus: 313, 315, 317, 400, 401, 402, 404, 406, 408, 409, 410, 412, 414, 417, 551, 555	Station closed between approximately 12:15am-4:20am Reopened in 2025
NJ	Camden	City Hall	NJ Transit Bus: 452, 453	Station closed between approximately 12am–5am
NJ	Camden	Broadway	NJ Transit: River Line; NJ Transit Bus: 313, 315, 316, 317, 400, 401, 402, 403, 404, 405, 406, 407, 408, 409, 410, 412, 413, 418, 419, 450, 451, 452, 453, 457, 551; Intercity bus: Greyhound; South Jersey Transportation Authority	All connections via Walter Rand Transportation Center
NJ	Camden	Ferry Avenue	NJ Transit Bus: 453	
NJ	Collingswood	Collingswood	NJ Transit Bus: 451	
NJ	Haddon Twp.	Westmont	NJ Transit Bus: 450, 451	
NJ	Haddonfield	Haddonfield	NJ Transit Bus: 451, 455, 457	
NJ	Cherry Hill	Woodcrest		
NJ	Voorhees	Ashland		
NJ	Lindenwold	Lindenwold	NJ Transit Rail: ACL Atlantic City Line; NJ Transit Bus: 403, 459, 554	

- Some westbound trains skip Collingswood, Westmont, and Haddonfield during the morning rush hour.

== See also ==
- List of metro systems
- PATH (rail system), a similar rapid transit/commuter rail system connecting North Jersey to New York City
- Transportation in New Jersey
- Transportation in Philadelphia
