= Lindenwold station =

NJ Transit rail station

Lindenwold
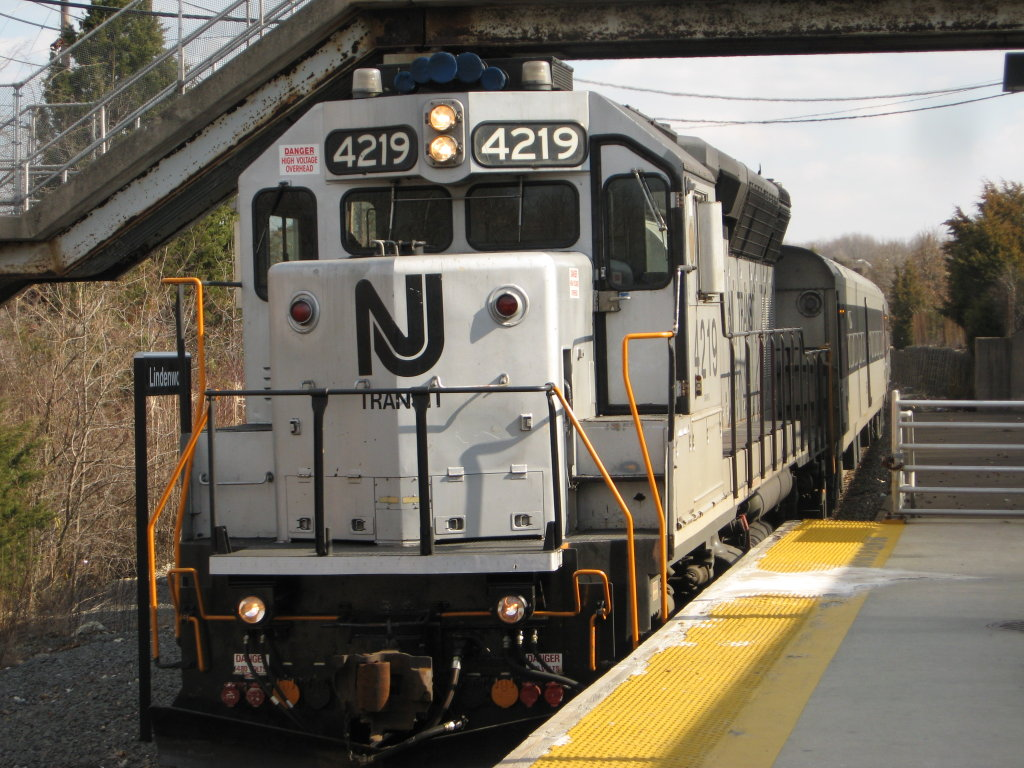
- Atlantic City Line train at Lindenwold station in 2008

General information
- Location: 901 Berlin Road North; Lindenwold, New Jersey
- Coordinates: 39°50′2″N 75°0′2″W
- Platforms: 1 side platform, 1 island platform
- Tracks: 2 (PATCO); 1 (NJ Transit)
- Connections: NJ Transit Bus: 403, 459, 554

Construction
- Parking: 3,227 spaces
- Cycle facilities: Racks
- Accessible: Yes

Other information
- Station code: Amtrak: LDW

History
- Opened: January 4, 1969 (PATCO); May 23, 1989 (Amtrak); September 17, 1989 (NJ Transit)

Passengers
NJ Transit
- 2025: 168 (average weekday)
- Rank: 104 of 153
PATCO
- 2025: 2,079 (average weekday)
- Rank: 3 of 14

Services
Preceding station	NJ Transit	Following station
Cherry Hill toward Philadelphia	Atlantic City Line	Atco toward Atlantic City
Preceding station	DRPA	Following station
Ashland toward 15–16th & Locust	PATCO Speedline	Terminus
Former services
Preceding station	Amtrak	Following station
Philadelphia toward Richmond Staples Mill Road, Harrisburg or Springfield	Atlantic City Express 1989–1994	Atlantic City Terminus
Preceding station	Pennsylvania-Reading Seashore Lines	Following station
Terminus	Main Line	Hammonton toward Atlantic City
Former services at Kirkwood station
Preceding station	Pennsylvania-Reading Seashore Lines	Following station
Osage toward Camden	WJ&S Main Line	Lindenwold toward Atlantic City
Location

Lindenwold station is an intermodal transit hub and park and ride in the borough of Lindenwold, Camden County, New Jersey. Located at the intersection of Berlin Road (County Route 702) and White Horse Road West (County Route 673) just north of the White Horse Pike (U.S. Route 30), the station services trains of the PATCO Speedline (operated by the Delaware River Port Authority (DRPA)) and New Jersey Transit's Atlantic City Line. The station also serves three separate New Jersey Transit bus routes and Amtrak Thruway bus services connected to Amtrak's long-distance train services.

Lindenwold station serves as the eastern terminus of PATCO, with the maintenance yard located to the east of the station platform. All trains from there head west toward 15–16th & Locust station in Philadelphia, Pennsylvania. The PATCO platform consists of a single island platform to service trains. The Atlantic City Line platform is a single side platform with shelter servicing one track against the retaining wall of the PATCO platform. All Atlantic City Line trains operate from 30th Street Station in Philadelphia to the Atlantic City Rail Terminal in the eponymous Atlantic City, New Jersey.

Located at the site of the former Kirkwood station of the Pennsylvania-Reading Seashore Lines (PRSL), the PATCO station opened on January 4, 1969. As part of the station opening, PRSL service was truncated from Philadelphia to the new station at Lindenwold, necessitating a transfer to PATCO to reach Philadelphia. Service on the line would be discontinued on June 30, 1982. The station remained a PATCO only facility until May 23, 1989, when Amtrak began operating the Atlantic City Express from Penn Station in New York City to Atlantic City. NJ Transit began operation of a new commuter line, the Atlantic City Line, on September 17, 1989, still requiring a transfer at Lindenwold to reach Philadelphia. NJ Transit opened a new station at Cherry Hill on July 2, 1994, eliminating Amtrak service at Lindenwold. Amtrak discontinued the service nine months later and all NJ Transit trains were extended to 30th Street Station.

== History ==
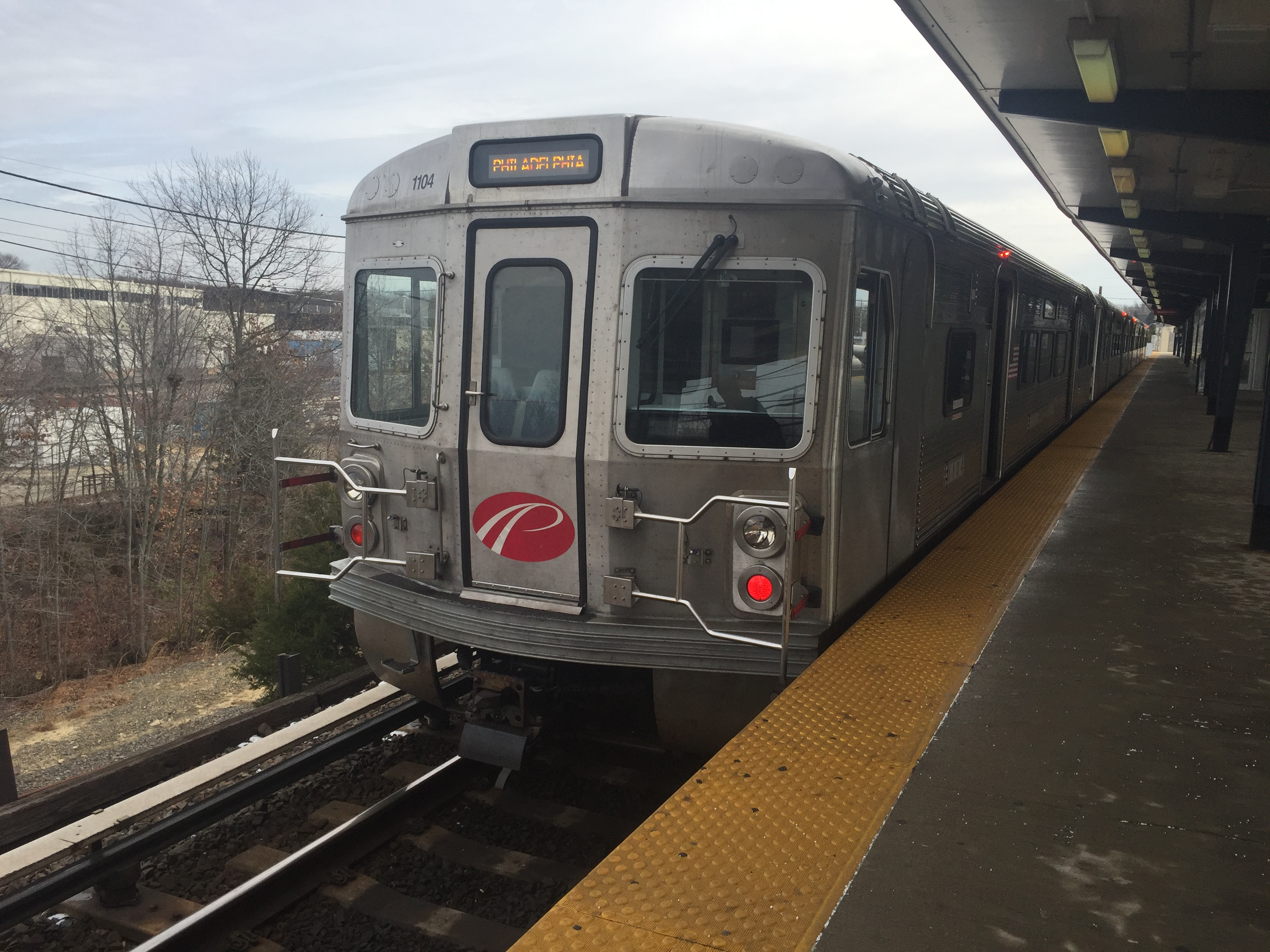
A PATCO train at Lindenwold in February 2017

The Pennsylvania-Reading Seashore Lines (PRSL) formerly operated a station at nearby Kirkwood. On January 4, 1969, the Bridge Line subway was extended as the PATCO Speedline to a park-and-ride terminus at Lindenwold. PRSL service was cut back from Philadelphia to Lindenwold; passengers had to transfer to reach Philadelphia. This forced transfer hurt already dwindling ridership, and the service (by then operated by Conrail and funded by the state) ended on June 30, 1982.

On May 21, 1989, Amtrak began operating the Atlantic City Express service from New York and Washington to Atlantic City, with Lindenwold as an intermediate stop. NJ Transit began operating local service between Atlantic City and Lindenwold on September 17, 1989. Some NJ Transit trains were extended from Lindenwold to Philadelphia on May 2, 1993. NJ Transit opened Cherry Hill station on July 2, 1994; Amtrak began stopping there instead of Lindenwold. Amtrak service to Atlantic City ended entirely on April 2, 1995; all NJ Transit service was extended to Philadelphia at that time. However, Lindenwold is still commonly used to transfer between NJ Transit and PATCO service.

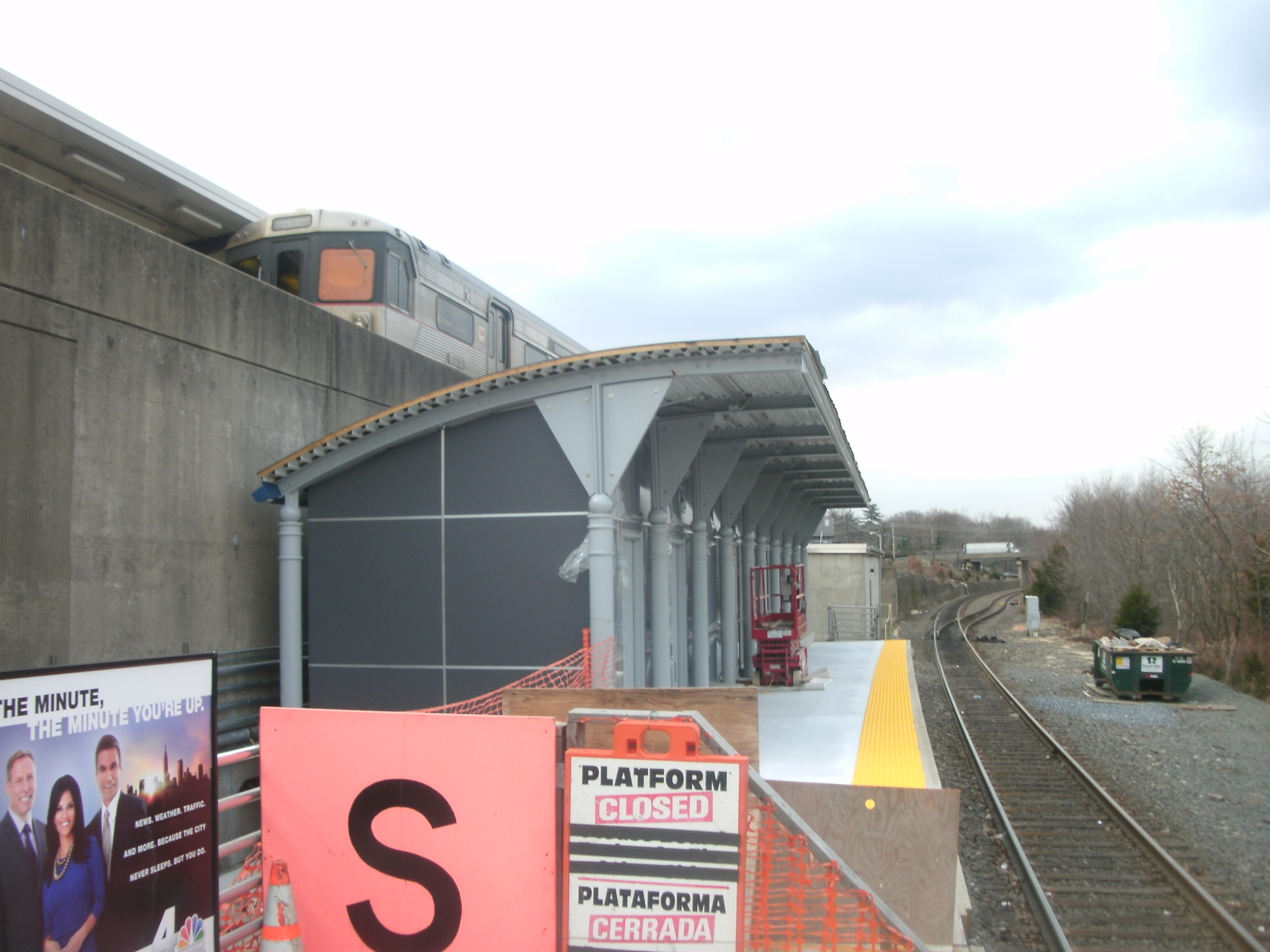
New NJT shelter under construction in December 2011

In 2011, NJ Transit began construction of a new PATCO waiting room, Atlantic City Line shelter, a new platform entrance, and other work. The modifications were originally intended to be completed in 2012, but took until 2014.

Starting in 2021, as part of PATCO's "Station Enhancements Project", Lindenwold station is in the process of being remodeled. Changes include the replacement of glass block windows with a curtain wall system, and a complete interior re-build, including remodeled headhouses and station platforms, backlit entrance signage, and white interior and exterior LED lighting. Additionally, solar panels have been installed as part of a solar farm project to provide more than half of PATCO's electricity needs at Lindenwold as well as other above ground stations. A side benefit will provide covered parking for patrons.

== Station layout and services ==
Lindenwold station contains three tracks and two station platforms. The PATCO Speedline tracks and island platform are elevated on a retaining wall over the Atlantic City Line side platform and single track. The PATCO platform is covered and serves as the terminus of all trains coming east from 15–16th & Locust station. PATCO also maintains a yard east of the platform. All New Jersey Transit services are on the lower single side platform and single track, which contains a single shelter against the retaining wall for the PATCO tracks. The Atlantic City Line platform has one ticket vending machine, located in the shelter. Lindenwold station has a parking lot with 3,227 spaces for vehicles, much of which are covered by solar canopies in order reduce carbon emission use at the station. The parking lot is maintained by PATCO and is free for people to use at all times except in lot no. 2, which is accessible through FREEDOM Cards between 5:00 a.m. and 10:00 a.m. Bicycle racks and lockers are available for the use of bicyclists at Lindenwold station. The station has elevators and high-level platforms to ensure that persons with disabilities can use the station.

New Jersey Transit operates the 554 bus route between Lindenwold and the Atlantic City Bus Terminal seven days a week, making all local Atlantic City Line stops between the two stations. At Lindenwold station, the 554 bus makes its stop at the PATCO station platform. In addition to the 554, New Jersey Transit's 403 bus (from Walter Rand Transportation Center in Camden to Turnersville) and 459 bus (Avandale Park and Ride in Sicklerville to Voorhees Town Center) both make stops at Lindenwold station.
