= 15–16th & Locust station =

PATCO Speedline rapid transit station in Philadelphia

15–16th & Locust
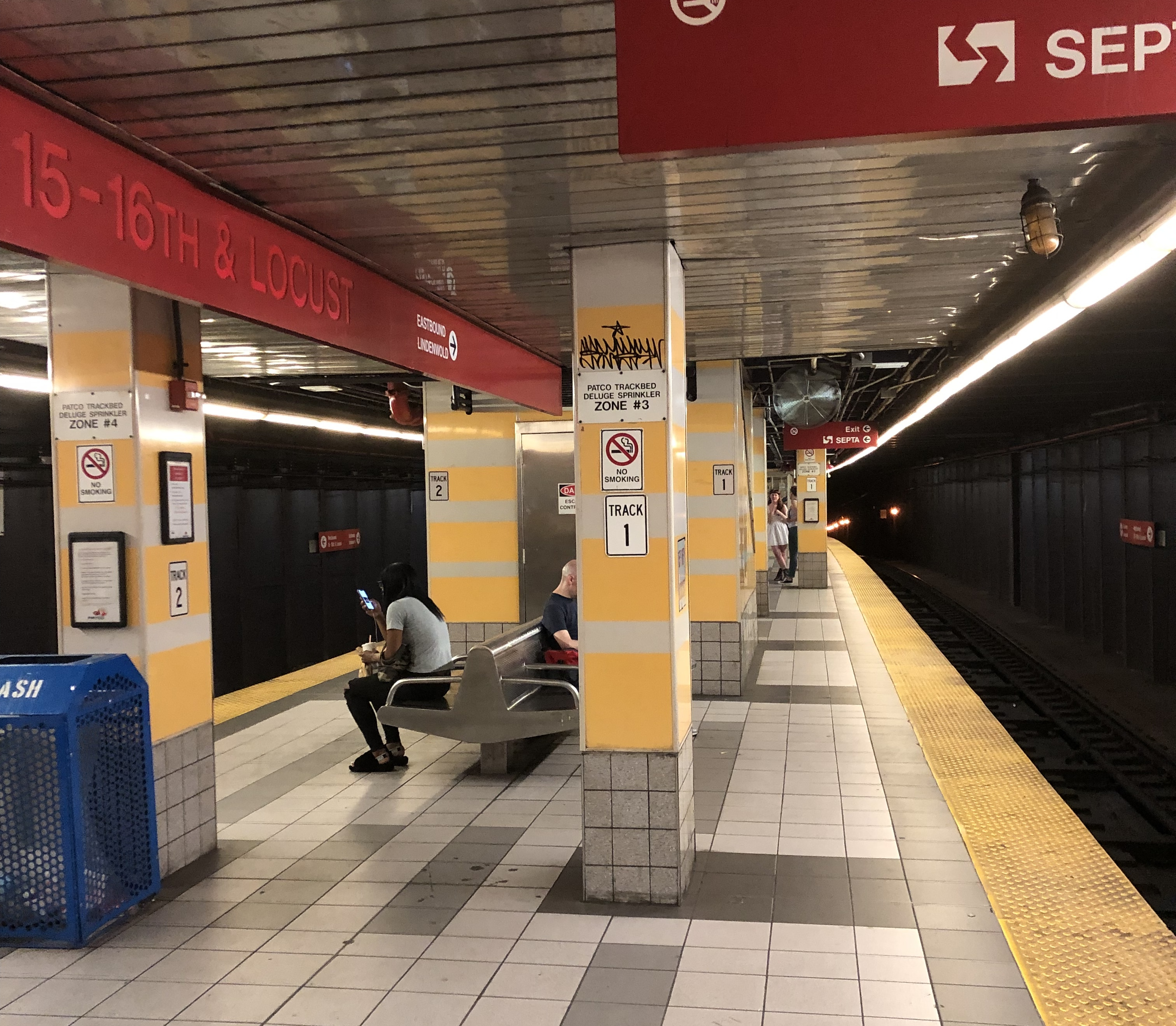
- 15–16th & Locust station platform in 2018

General information
- Location: 15th and Locust Streets; Philadelphia, Pennsylvania, U.S.
- Coordinates: 39°56′54″N 75°09′58″W
- Owner: City of Philadelphia
- Operator: Delaware River Port Authority
- Platforms: 1 island platform
- Tracks: 2
- Connections: (at Walnut–Locust); SEPTA City Bus: 2, 12

Construction
- Cycle facilities: Racks
- Accessible: Yes

Other information
- Website: ridepatco.org/stations/15th.asp

History
- Opened: February 15, 1953

Passengers
- 2025: 3,249 (average weekday)
- Rank: 1 of 14

Services
Preceding station	DRPA	Following station
Terminus	PATCO Speedline	12–13th & Locust toward Lindenwold
Location

15–16th & Locust station is the western terminus of the PATCO Speedline rapid transit route at 15th and Locust Streets in the Rittenhouse Square neighborhood of Center City Philadelphia. The station has a single island platform with a fare mezzanine above. The mezzanine level connects to the Downtown Link concourse, which connects to Walnut–Locust stations in the Center City area.

== Notable places nearby ==
The station is within walking distance of the following notable places:

- Academy of Music
- Avenue of the Arts
- Kimmel Center for the Performing Arts
- Miller Theatre
- Rittenhouse Square
- Wilma Theater
