= Franklin Square station =

Rapid transit station in Philadelphia

Franklin Square
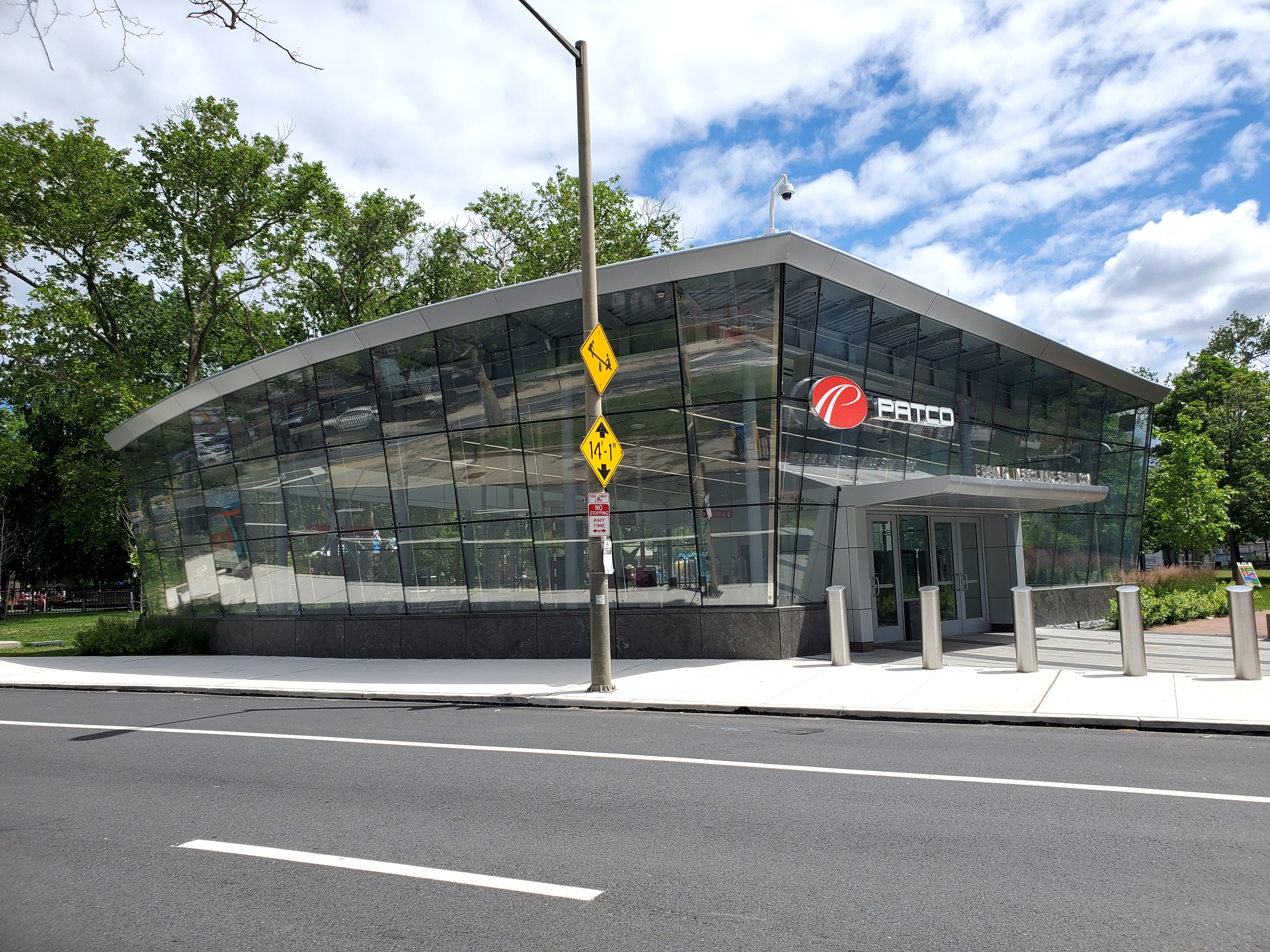
- Headhouse in Franklin Square in May 2025

General information
- Location: 7th and Race streets Philadelphia, Pennsylvania
- Coordinates: 39.95529°N 75.15109°W
- Owner: Delaware River Port Authority
- Platforms: 2 side platforms
- Tracks: 2
- Connections: SEPTA City Bus: 47

Construction
- Structure type: Underground
- Accessible: Yes

Other information
- Website: www.ridepatco.org/stations/franklinsquare.asp

History
- Opened: June 7, 1936; April 1, 1952; May 14, 1976; April 3, 2025
- Closed: July 10, 1939; late 1952; September 7, 1979
- Rebuilt: 1975–1976; 2022–2025

Services
| Preceding station | DRPA | Following station |
|---|---|---|
| 8th & Market toward 15–16th & Locust | PATCO Speedline | City Hall toward Lindenwold |
Location

Franklin Square station is an underground rapid transit station on the PATCO Speedline, operated by the Delaware River Port Authority (DRPA). It is located beneath Franklin Square, at 7th and Race streets in Philadelphia, Pennsylvania, United States. First opened on June 7, 1936, Franklin Square station has had several periods of closure and reopening due to low ridership. The station's most recent reopening occurred on April 3, 2025, marking the first time since 1979 that PATCO trains have stopped at the station.

The station is the easternmost stop on the PATCO Speedline in Pennsylvania, situated just west of the Benjamin Franklin Bridge, which connects Philadelphia to Camden, New Jersey. Its location serves as a key access point for travelers from South Jersey to nearby neighborhoods, businesses, and Old City attractions.

This is one of the few PATCO stations that does not have 24-hour service; the station is closed daily between 12:15 am and 4:15 am.

== History ==
=== Bridge Line station ===
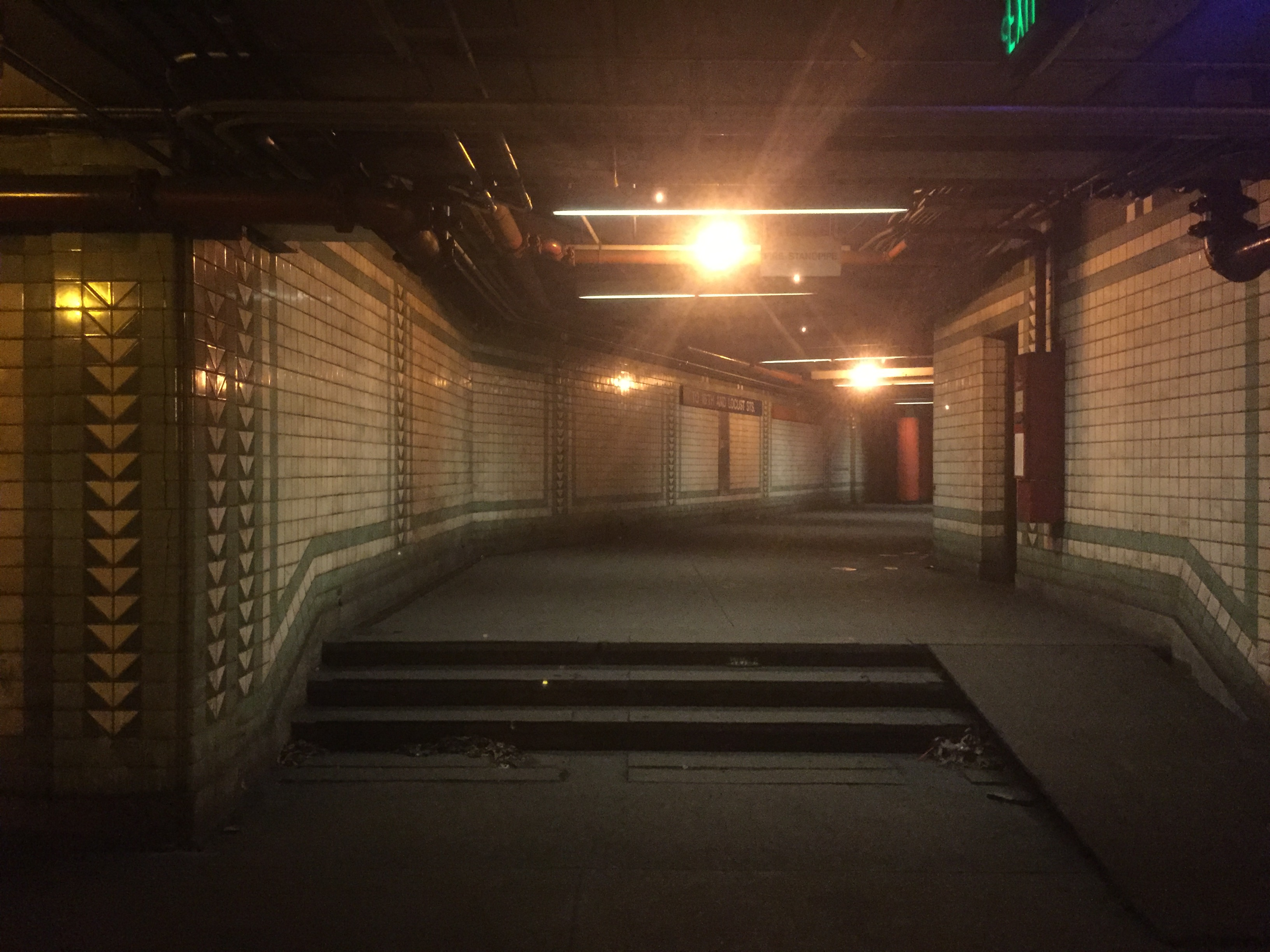
The corridor connecting the two side platforms of the then-closed station in 2018

Franklin Square station was constructed starting in 1934, with houses demolished on the west side of Franklin Square to make way for the Bridge Line rapid transit service to New Jersey, utilizing cut-and-cover techniques. Beneath the square, the tunnels are split apart, with the tracks closer together on the southwest corner and gradually spreading further apart toward the northeast corner. This shift occurs as the tracks are positioned on the outsides of the Benjamin Franklin Bridge over the Delaware River. During construction, about half of the trees in the park were removed. Afterward, the park was restored with new walkways, trees, and grass.

The station opened as one of the first four stations of the Bridge Line on June 7, 1936, along with City Hall and Broadway in Camden and 8th Street in Philadelphia. However, due to low ridership, with only 1.5% of passengers using the stop, the station was closed on July 10, 1939.

=== Sporadic reopenings and closures ===
The station remained closed for over a decade until it briefly reopened in 1952, following the discontinuation of the Philadelphia and Camden Ferry across the Delaware River in April. On January 4, 1969, Franklin Square was ceremonially reopened for one day to mark the launch of the PATCO Speedline, but it did not resume regular service at that time.

The station underwent a $1 million renovation before reopening as a fully functional PATCO station on May 14, 1976, to serve the United States Bicentennial celebrations in the nearby Independence National Historical Park area. During the peak of the celebrations, Franklin Square Station saw more than 27,000 riders each week. However, after the celebrations ended, ridership again declined. By 1979, fewer than 400 people a day were boarding at the station, leading to its closure once again on September 7, 1979. At that time, the DRPA, the parent agency of PATCO, committed to maintaining the station for future reopening if demand warranted. The bicentennial-era headhouse was demolished in 1983.

=== 2020s reopening ===
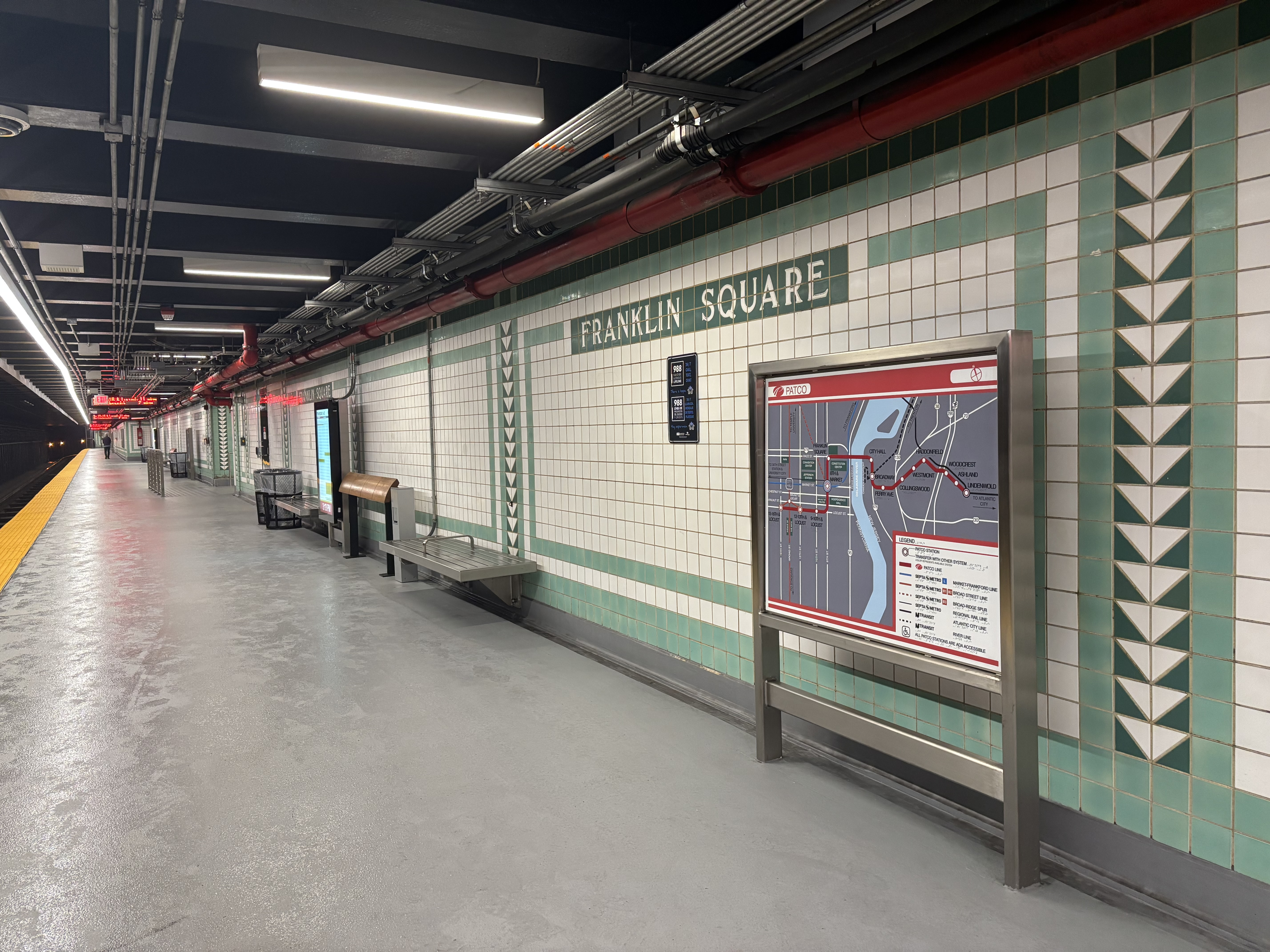
The renovated eastbound platform on opening day.

In 2009, the Delaware River Port Authority (DRPA) began planning for the renovation and modernization of Franklin Square station. The project was officially announced in 2016, with an initial reopening target of 2021. However, delays caused by the COVID-19 pandemic pushed the construction start to mid-2021, with the anticipated opening set for Fall 2024.

The $29.3 million renovation, which got underway in 2022, involved extensive upgrades to the station's mechanical, electrical, and structural systems. The new headhouse features transparent speckled smoked glass designed to prevent bird collisions, as well as a green roof to manage stormwater runoff. The underground platform and concourses were refurbished with energy-efficient LED lighting and modern communication systems, while preserving the station’s original 1930s green-and-white tiles. The project also made the station more accessible by adding elevators, escalators, and ramps to improve ease of access. The station ultimately reopened on April 3, 2025. The station is expected to serve around 1,500 riders daily.
