= City Hall station (PATCO) =

Rapid transit station in Camden, New Jersey

City Hall
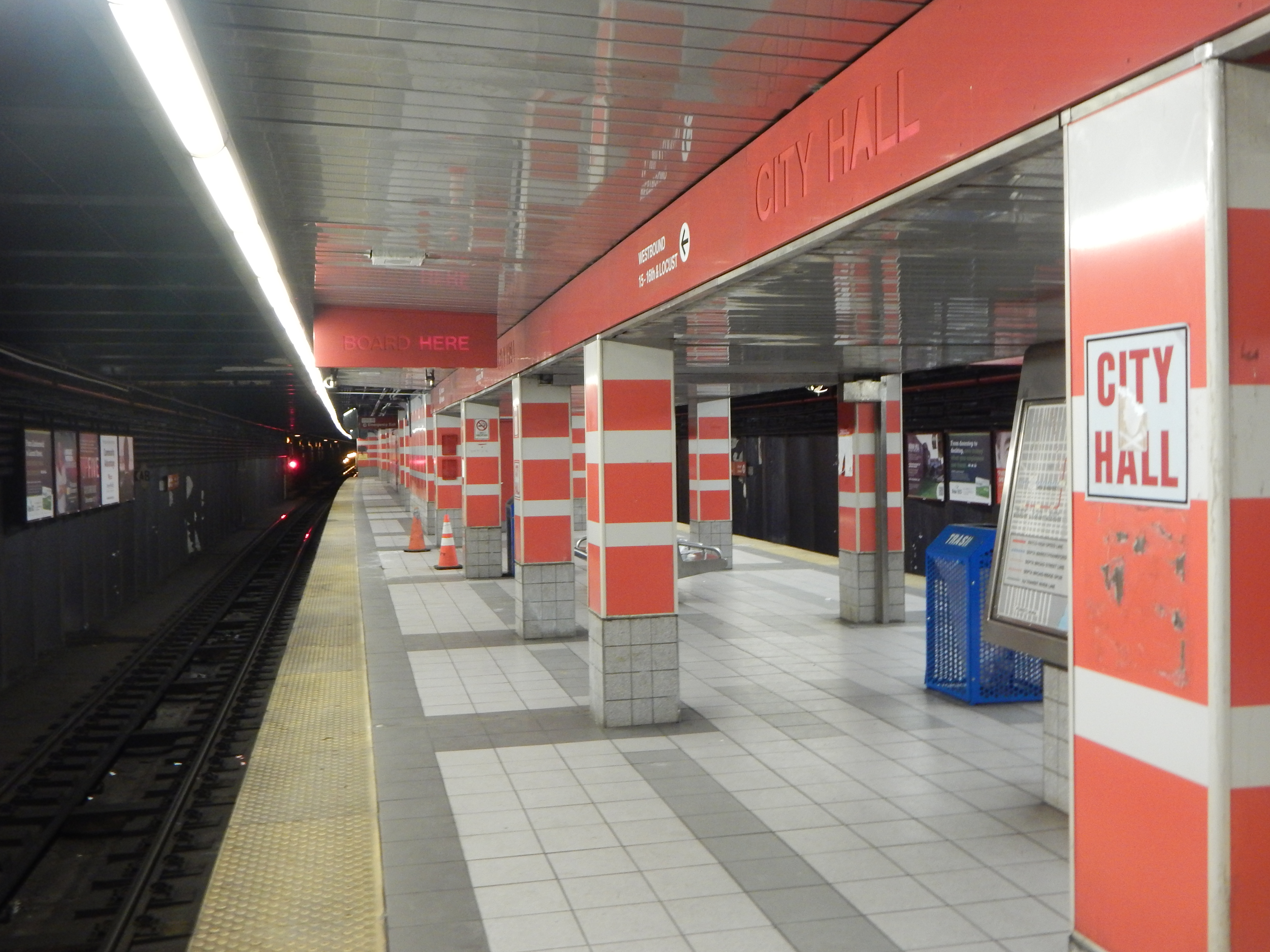
- City Hall station platform in April 2015

General information
- Location: 5th and Market streets Camden, New Jersey
- Coordinates: 39.9459°N 75.1211°W
- Owner: Delaware River Port Authority
- Platforms: 1 island platform
- Tracks: 2
- Connections: NJ Transit Bus: 452, 453

Construction
- Cycle facilities: Racks
- Accessible: Yes

History
- Opened: June 7, 1936
- Rebuilt: December 28, 1968–January 4, 1969

Passengers
- 2025: 696 (average weekday)
- Rank: 13 of 14

Services
Preceding station	DRPA	Following station
Franklin Square toward 15–16th & Locust	PATCO Speedline	Broadway toward Lindenwold
Location

City Hall station is an underground rapid transit station on the PATCO Speedline, operated by the Delaware River Port Authority. It is located in Camden, New Jersey, one block from Camden City Hall, after which the station is named, at North 5th and Market Streets. Opened on June 7, 1936, the station is the first eastbound and final westbound station in New Jersey, located just east of the Benjamin Franklin Bridge which carries trains over the Delaware River.

This is one of the few PATCO stations that does not have 24-hour service; the station is closed daily between midnight and 5 am.

== History ==
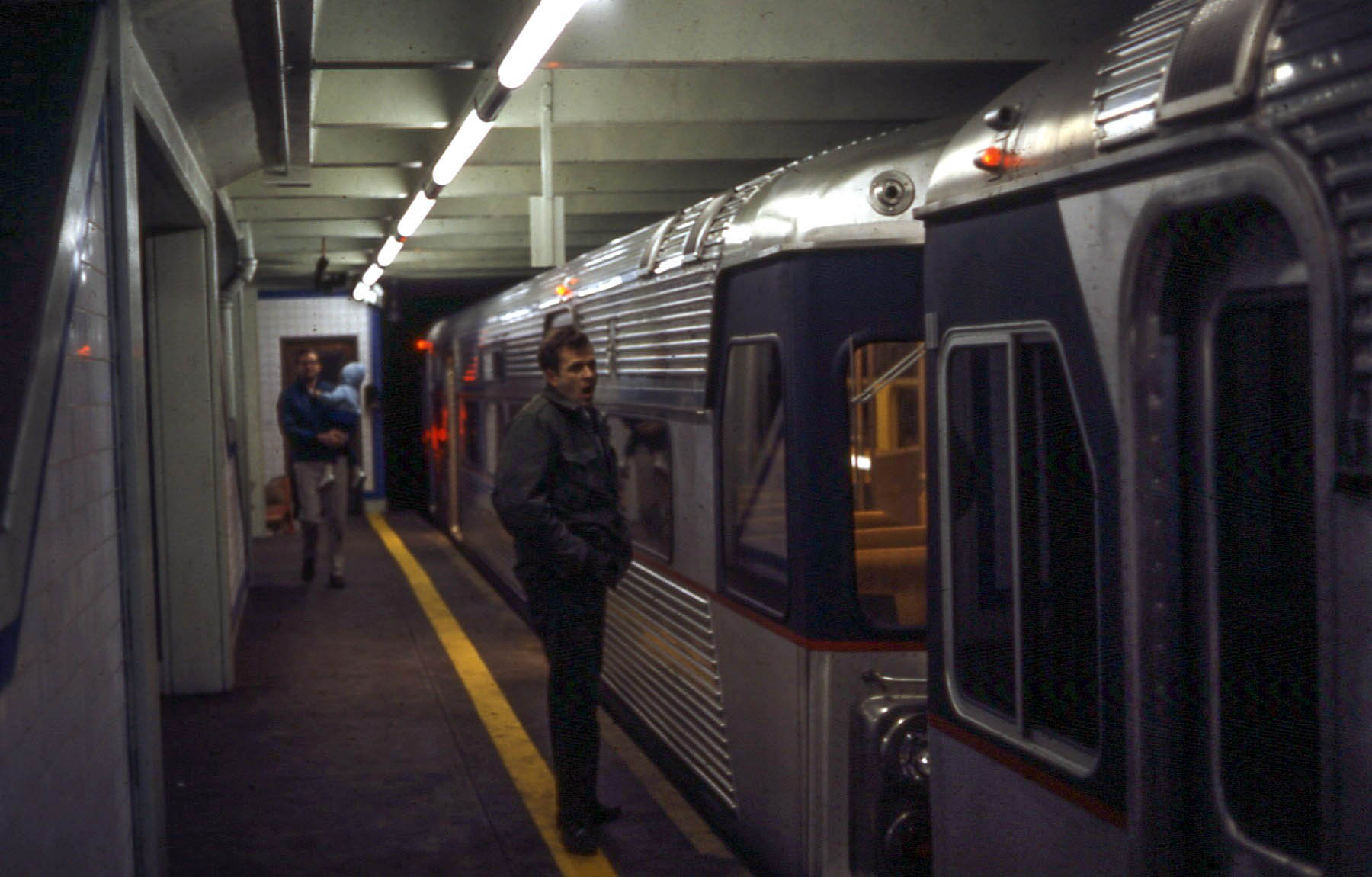
A train at the station in 1969

The station was opened on June 7, 1936, along with 8th & Market and Franklin Square in Philadelphia and Broadway in Camden, as part of Bridge Line rapid transit service. The Bridge Line closed on December 28, 1968, for conversion into the PATCO Speedline. The section between Lindenwold and City Hall opened on January 4, 1969, followed a few weeks later by the section between City Hall and Philadelphia on February 14.

City Hall is one of the least utilized stations on the PATCO line. Originally constructed with long corridors under 5th Street leading to both Arch Street and Cooper Street, the station featured separate entrances at the north and south corners of Cooper Street and 5th Street. However, due to consistently low ridership, these corridors have been closed. There are three stairways at the northeast, southwest and southeast corners of Market Street and 5th Street. The northeast stairway is designated for emergency use only. The stairway at the southeast corner (inside Roosevelt Park) opened in 2023 as part of a PATCO project to improve accessiblity at the station. An elevator was also added at southeast corner along with an elevator connecting the platform and mezzanine.

In August 2022, PATCO discontinued 24-hour service at City Hall station, citing low ridership, safety concerns, and the proximity of Broadway station as factors in the decision.
