= Franklin Square (Philadelphia) =

Park in Philadelphia, US

- U.S. National Register of Historic Places
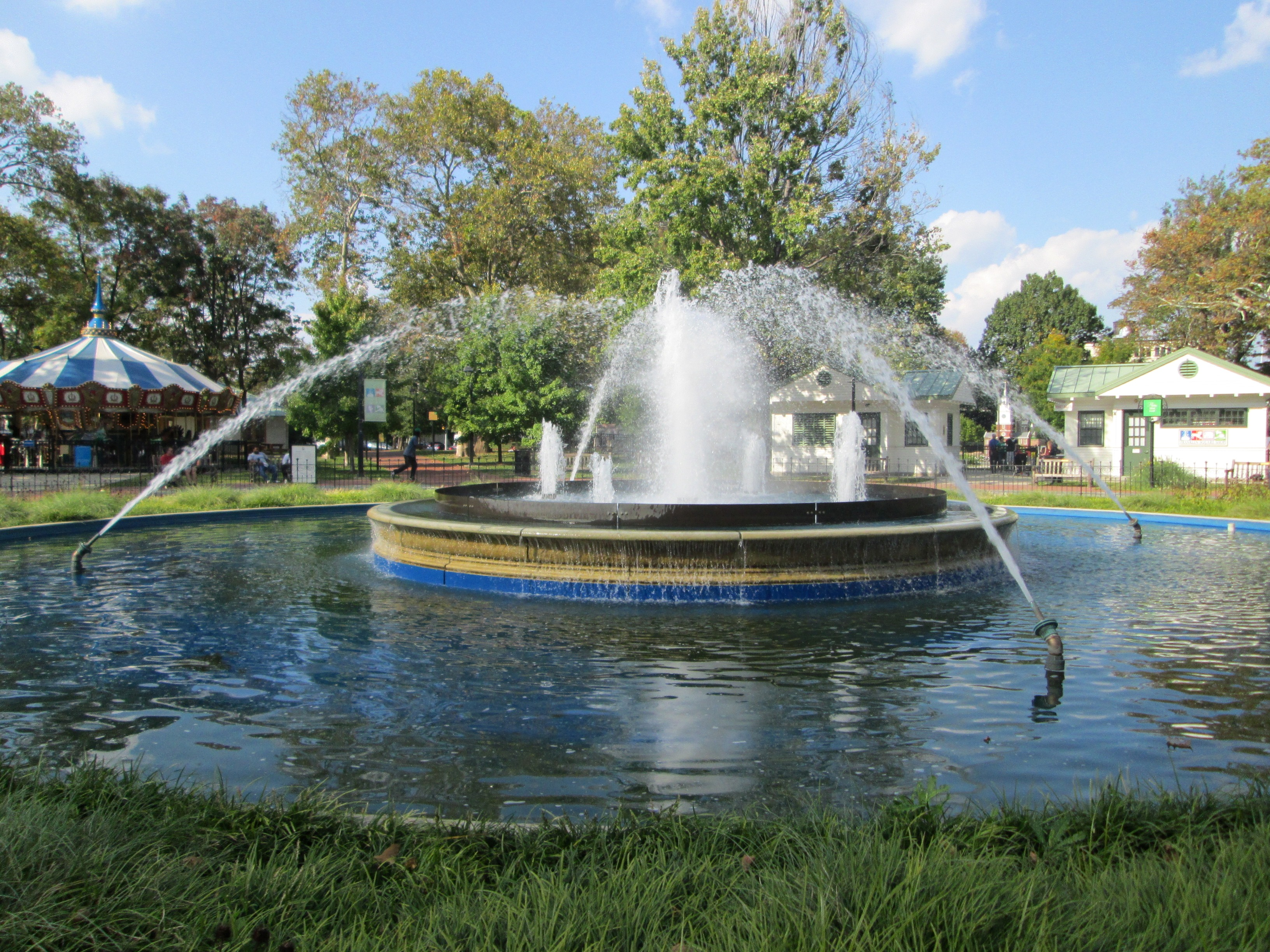
- The fountain at the center of Franklin Square in 2013

- Location within Philadelphia Location within Pennsylvania Location within the United States
- Location: Race, N. 6th and N. 7th Streets; Philadelphia, Pennsylvania
- Coordinates: 39°57′19.83″N 75°9′2.84″W
- Area: 7.5 acres (3.0 ha)
- Built: 1683
- Architect: Thomas Holme
- Website: http://historicphiladelphia.org/franklin-square/what-to-see/
- MPS: Four Public Squares of Philadelphia TR
- NRHP reference No.: 81000556
- Added to NRHP: September 14, 1981

Franklin Square is one of the five original open-space parks planned by William Penn when he laid out the city of Philadelphia, Pennsylvania, in 1682. It is located in the Center City area, between North 6th and 7th streets, and between Race Street and the Vine Street Expressway (I-676).

Penn included this piece of green space in his original city plan as one of five squares, although the park was slow to develop because it was a marshy land. Originally, the park was a place for settlers to meditate and set a virtuous behavior to set a proper example. The park was supposed to be landscaped to have settlers understand the value of nature.

In the 1920s, the park was abandoned and the surrounding area became known locally as the tenderloin with an entertainment district featuring taverns and bordellos, and became a place for individuals experiencing homelessness to sleep on the park's benches, resulting in its reputation as Philadelphia's skid row.

In 2003, Historic Philadelphia, Inc. renovated the park, restoring the park back to its original plan, as William Penn wanted the park to be used.

Historic Philadelphia, a non-profit organization, now manages it.

Franklin Square was added to the National Register of Historic Places (NRHP) in 1981.

== History ==
=== 19th century ===
Originally called North East Publick Square, Franklin Square was renamed in 1825 in honor of Benjamin Franklin, a Founding Father who represented colonial-era Province of Pennsylvania at the Second Continental Congress in Philadelphia.

The square was founded by William Penn, initially designed as a commercial center for settlers. Penn wanted settlers to have a space that was well-ordered to ensure they would set the proper example for fellow settlers. Penn wanted the space to set an example to promote social discipline. However, he did not have the proper warrant to have jurisdiction over the squares. When more settlers came to the land, the square was subject to neglect.

In 1741, Governor Thomas Penn leased the square to German Reformed Church.

The square initially was an open common used for grazing animals, and later for storing gunpowder during the Revolutionary War and drilling soldiers during the War of 1812.

From 1741 to 1835, a portion of the square was used as a cemetery by the German Reformed Church; some of the graves still remain, marked by a plaque. This plan was protested by Philadelphians who felt the cemetery was against William Penn's plan and wanted to ensure the square was used for nature purposes. Even though there were protests, the square was continually used for burial purposes.

During the 1820s, William Rush and Thomas Birch redesigned the park to depict nature by designing the park to be symmetrical to walkway and plant locations. This was to ensure the park would be orderly for tourists while also preserving Penn's vision for the park.

=== 20th century ===
In the late 19th and early 20th centuries, Franklin Square was at the center of a fashionable residential neighborhood; but beginning in the 1920s, a series of events corresponding with the rise of the automobile began the decline of the square and its surrounding neighborhood. The construction of the Benjamin Franklin Bridge, from 1922 to 1926, leveled blocks of row homes, shops, and other structures; the Bridge begins at the square's eastern boundary, 6th Street. The steady flow of cars over the bridge made Franklin Square's northern boundary, Vine Street, into one of the city's busiest thoroughfares, effectively cutting off pedestrian access on two of the square's sides.

Franklin Square declined significantly in pedestrian use. The surrounding area declined in commercial use, furthering the accompanying decline of neighborhood or tourist use of Franklin Square. During the depression, the square became a place for homeless and unemployed. Although there were raids to prevent this, the park attracted people in the surrounding areas who lost everything when settlers migrated to other places. This led to the encampment of homeless and further eroding of Franklin Square as a public green space.

Although Franklin Square had been a popular place for tourists and residents, the square began to decline due to neglect from city government. The neighborhood's residential character was further eroded when the Federal government established Independence Mall. The government acquired private land around the square in the 1950s and 1960s and demolished blocks of homes and other buildings. The construction of the Vine Street Expressway in the late 1980s exacerbated the problem. The park was effectively abandoned because of broken lights, trees in disarray, and the eroded historic fountain.

The lack of pedestrians caused the square to be an encampment site for the homeless and a place for drug dealers. Teachers from surrounding areas had to clean up the playground so the kids could still play on the playground set. The park was severely neglected to the point where people could not recognize the park and no longer wanted to visit.

In 1961, author Jane Jacobs wrote in The Death and Life of Great American Cities that Franklin Square had become "the city's Skid Row park," a description that fit for decades. Franklin Square was the least-used of Penn's original five squares and became encampment for the Philadelphia homeless.

=== 21st century ===
From 2003 to 2006, Historic Philadelphia, Inc., a non-profit company responsible for the Betsy Ross House and several other historical sites, refurbished the park in a $5.5 million project funded primarily by a grant from the state of Pennsylvania. Historic Philadelphia restored the fountain and cleaned up the park, aiming to bring the park back to that envisioned by William Penn.

The square was reopened and rededicated on July 31, 2006, in Franklin's tercentenary year. The revitalized park contains a number of family-friendly attractions such as a golf course, an improved playground, a carousel, and gardens. The park's restoration helped fulfill one of William Penn's original intentions: a green respite in the middle of the city. Recently, re-development activities surrounding Franklin Square have included new housing, commercial, and office spaces, including the redevelopment of the shuttered Metropolitan Hospital as a condominium project. As a result, pedestrian traffic has increased dramatically and residents and tourists alike are able to enjoy the park's attractions.

In 2009, the Delaware River Port Authority (DRPA) announced that it was commissioning a design plan for renovating, modernizing and reopening the PATCO Speedline's underground Franklin Square Station, closed since 1979.

As a result of ongoing capital projects scheduled to continue through 2016, PATCO stated in 2014, "We do not presently have the capacity or capital resources to evaluate the feasibility of reopening the Franklin Square Station."

However, the DRPA did rebuild the station. The $29.3 million renovation, which got underway in 2022, involved extensive upgrades to the station's mechanical, electrical, and structural systems. The new headhouse features transparent speckled smoked glass designed to prevent bird collisions, as well as a green roof to manage stormwater runoff. The underground platform and concourses were refurbished with energy-efficient LED lighting and modern communication systems, while preserving the station’s original 1930s green-and-white tiles. The project also made the station more accessible by adding elevators, escalators, and ramps to improve ease of access. The station ultimately reopened on April 3, 2025. The station is expected to serve around 1,500 riders daily.

== Attractions ==
=== Bolt of Lightning ===
Isamu Noguchi's Bolt of Lightning... A Memorial to Benjamin Franklin (1984)

Local legend maintains that Franklin Square is where Benjamin Franklin conducted his famous, though misunderstood, "kite and key" experiment in 1752. However, it would have been unlikely for Franklin to fly a kite near a cemetery, and not all that far from possible observers from town. The legend is memorialized in Isamu Noguchi's Bolt of Lightning... A Memorial to Benjamin Franklin, a 101-foot tall, 60-ton stainless steel sculpture commissioned by the Fairmount Park Art Association and costing $850,000. It was erected in 1984 in Monument Plaza at the base of the Benjamin Franklin Bridge, facing the square across 6th Street, a location personally chosen by Noguchi.

Noguchi had first proposed the sculpture in 1933, but the idea was rejected then as being too radical. The sculpture, which depicts a kite, a bolt of lightning and a key, is not universally admired. In 1984, the Philadelphia Inquirer said about it:

It shrinks in its plaza before the bridge, inaccessible to pedestrians and, for motorists, a sliver out-dazzled by a parade of billboards announcing the sizzle of Atlantic City. It is a crumpled, bent-can of a sculpture, in the end, a symbol more of the dispirited swatch of Vine Street it concludes; a propped-up monument to a city that, like Rodney Dangerfield, has had — and, with this piece of art, may continue to have — one tough time getting respect.

Columnist Larry Mendte called it "the ugliest piece of art in Philadelphia" and "a bizarre eyesore".

=== Fountain ===
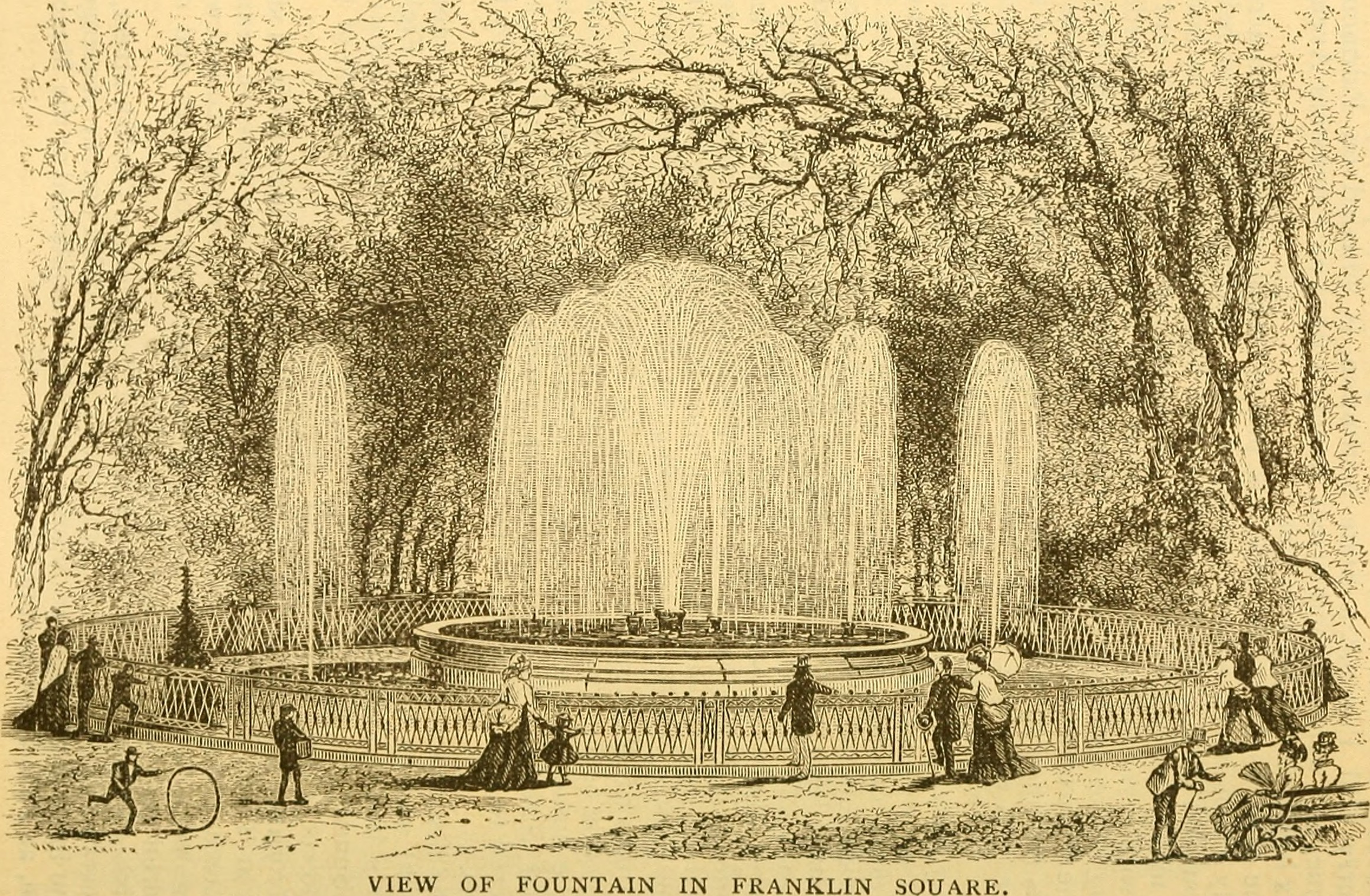
Franklin Square Fountain sketch

The Franklin Square Fountain was built in 1838 and the source of the water is from Schuylkill River. The fence and stone work of the fountain are from the original layout. The fountain is thought to be the oldest surviving fountain in William Penn's five historic squares. The fountain was the most important piece during the 19th century.

During the 1950s, the park along with the fountain was abandoned and its water was turned off. Historic Philadelphia restored and preserved the historic fountain as part of its park renovation. Now tourists can enjoy the fountain being the centerpiece and the surrounding nature. The fountain is currently receiving a makeover that will add new water features and an LED light show to the fountain, and is expected to reopen in summer of 2019.

=== Living Flame Memorial ===
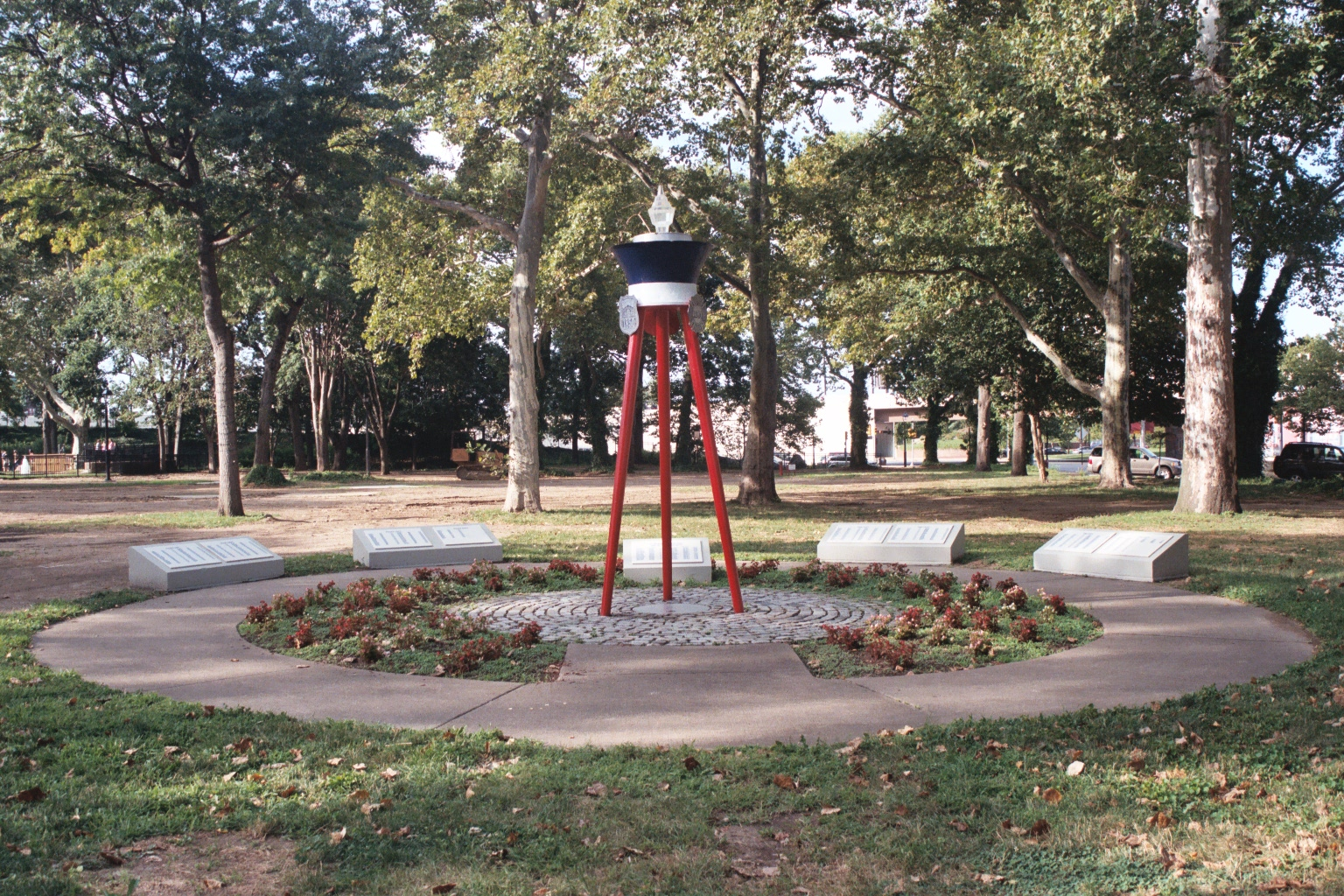
Reginald E. Beauchamp's 1976 Living Flame Memorial, dedicated to the city's police officers and firefighters

In 1976, the Living Flame Memorial was erected to honor the city's fallen police officers and firefighters. The memorial is centered by Reginald E. Beauchamp. The memorial has a fund called Fallen Heroes Support Fund to support the fallen police officers and firefighters. In 2011, there was a competition to create a new design for the memorial.

== Happenings ==
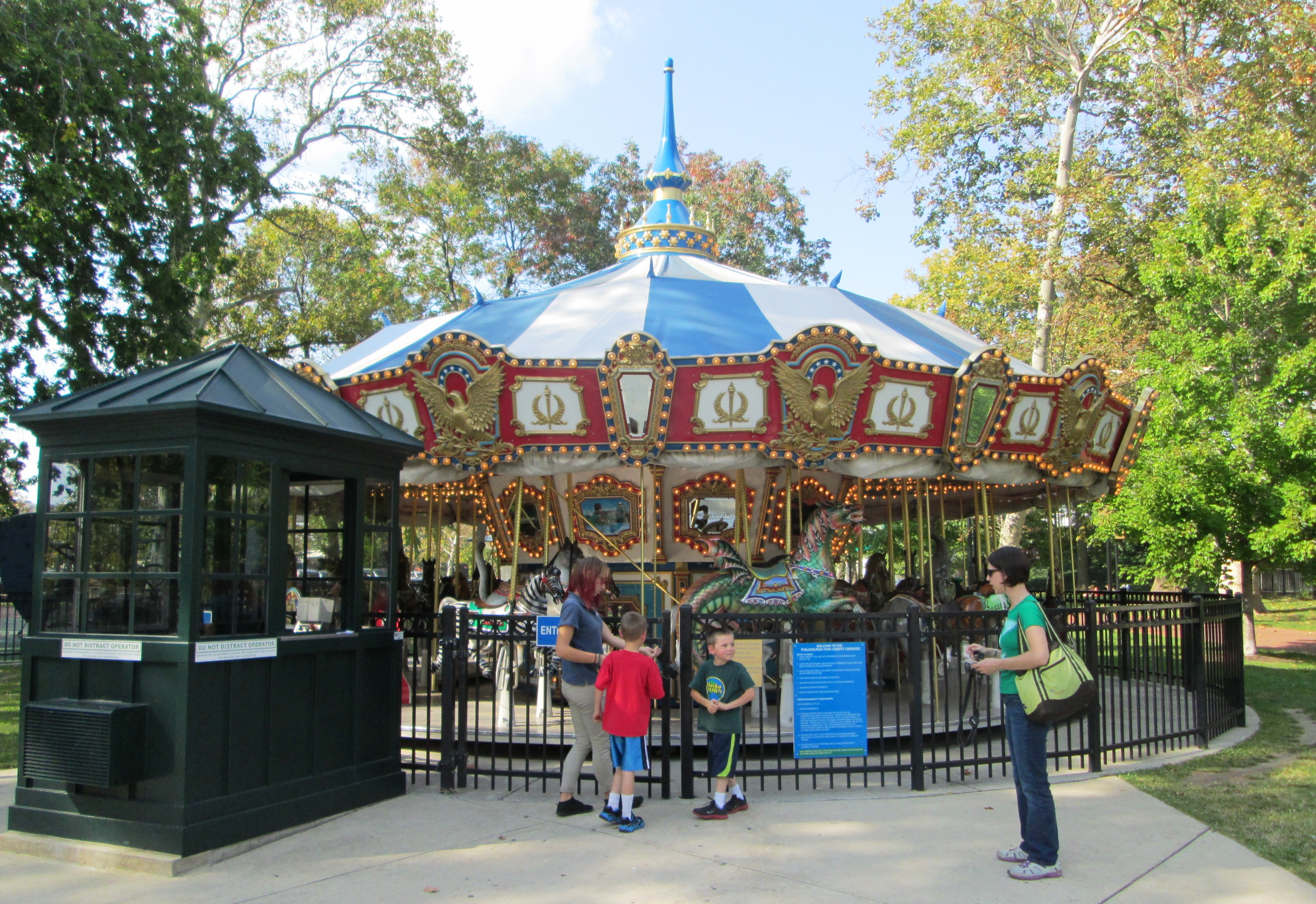
The Liberty Carousel in the park

- The Parx Liberty Carousel is located just northwest of the Fountain. Many of the carousel's animals recall Philadelphia's historical heritage.
- Philly Mini Golf, located north of the Fountain, is the only miniature golf course in Center City. The holes are based on some of the city's best-known tourist spots, such as Elfreth's Alley, the Benjamin Franklin Bridge, and the Liberty Bell.
- Two playgrounds, one for younger children, and the other for older ones, are located in the park's southeast quadrant.
- A food vendor, SquareBurger, is located near the Fountain.
- Franklin Square has a tradition of hosting the Philadelphia Chinese Festival. The park will have 29 different handcrafted lanterns and this gives tourists the opportunity to explore Franklin Square.

== Gallery ==
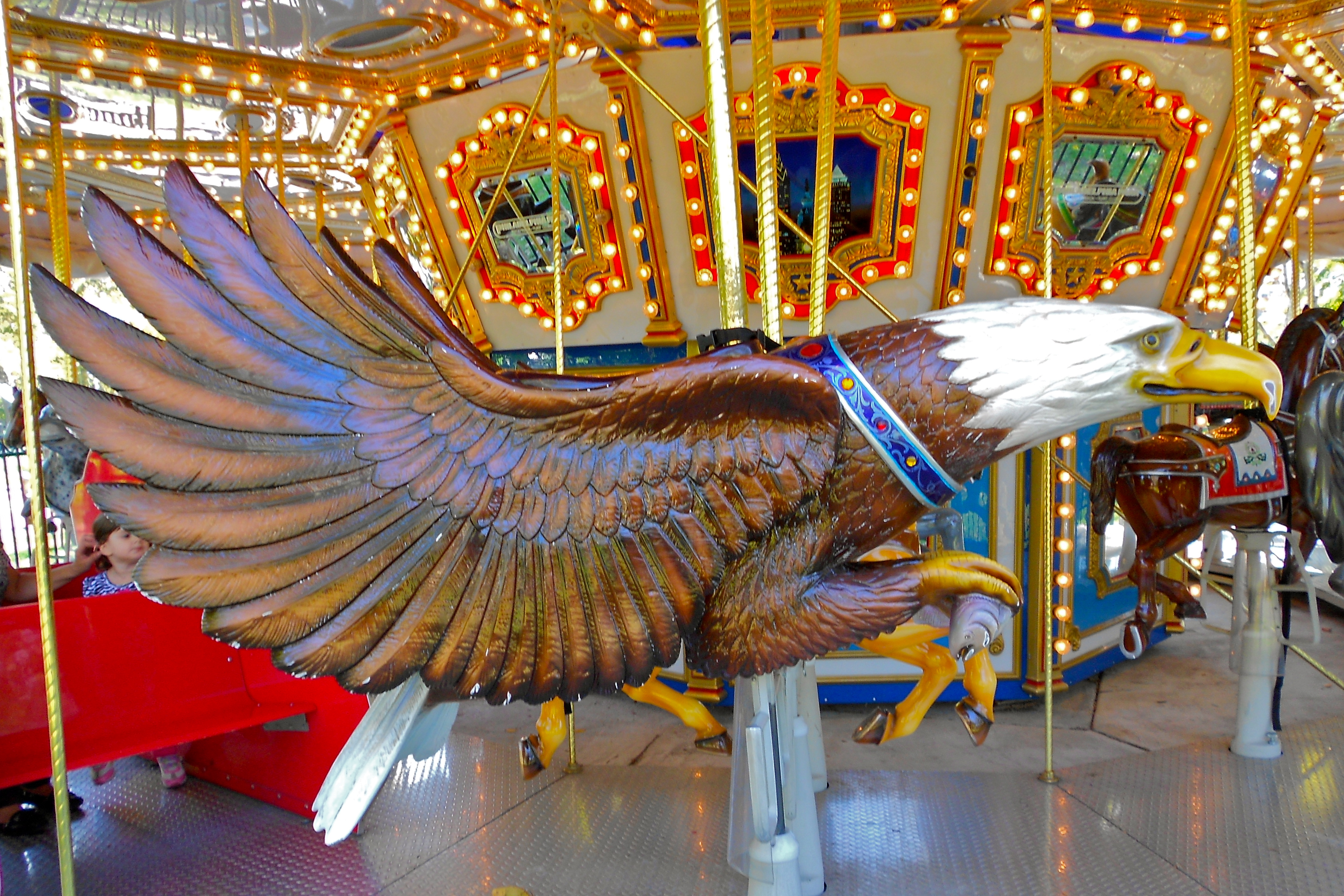
Carousel eagle

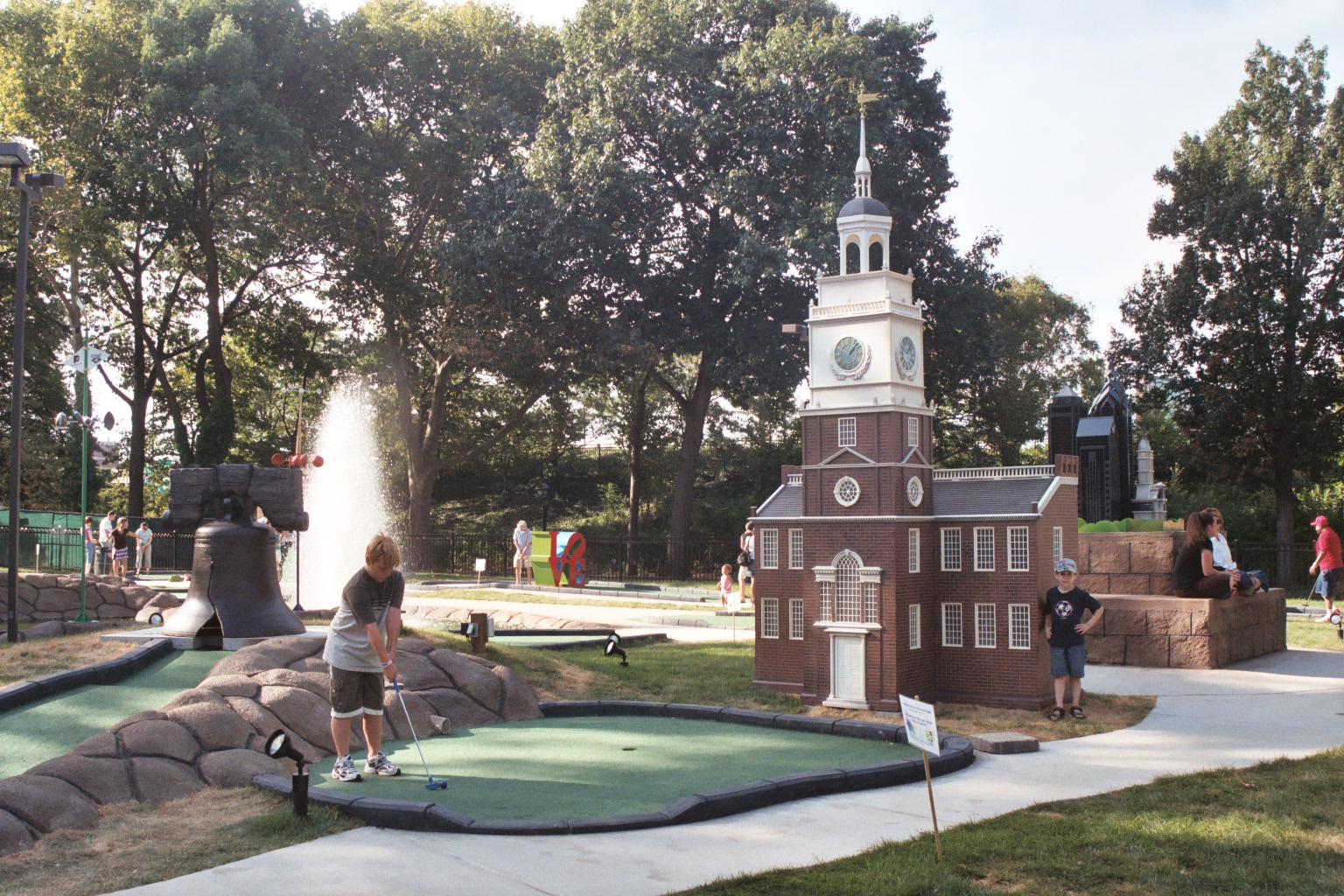
Philly Mini Golf

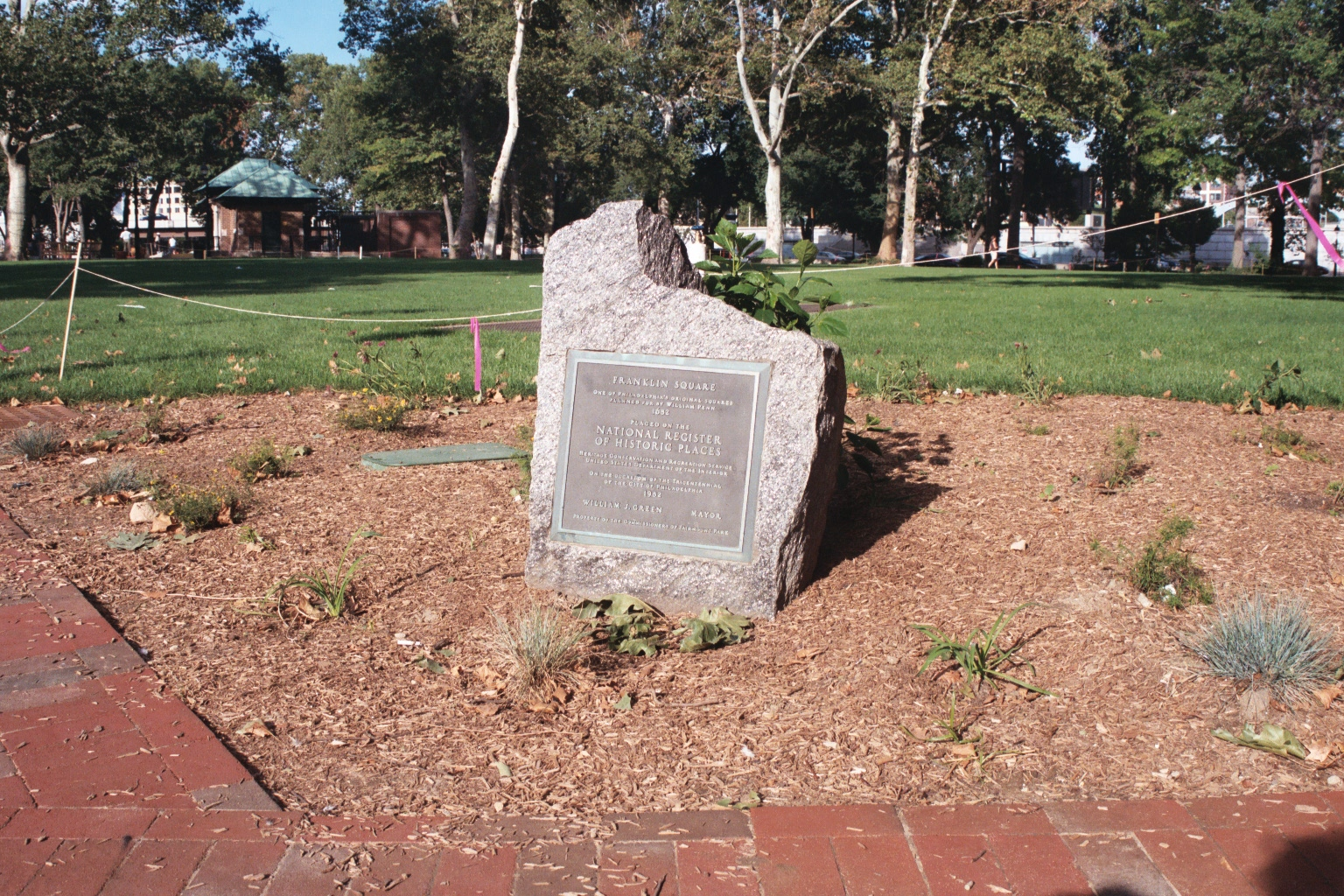
Franklin Square NRHP Plaque

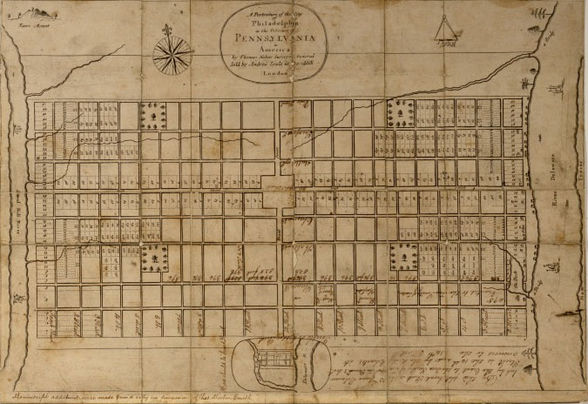
Thomas Holme's sketch of Philadelphia

== See also ==
- Franklin Square (PATCO station)
- List of parks in Philadelphia
