= Bridge Line (Delaware River) =

Former rapid transit service in Philadelphia and Camden

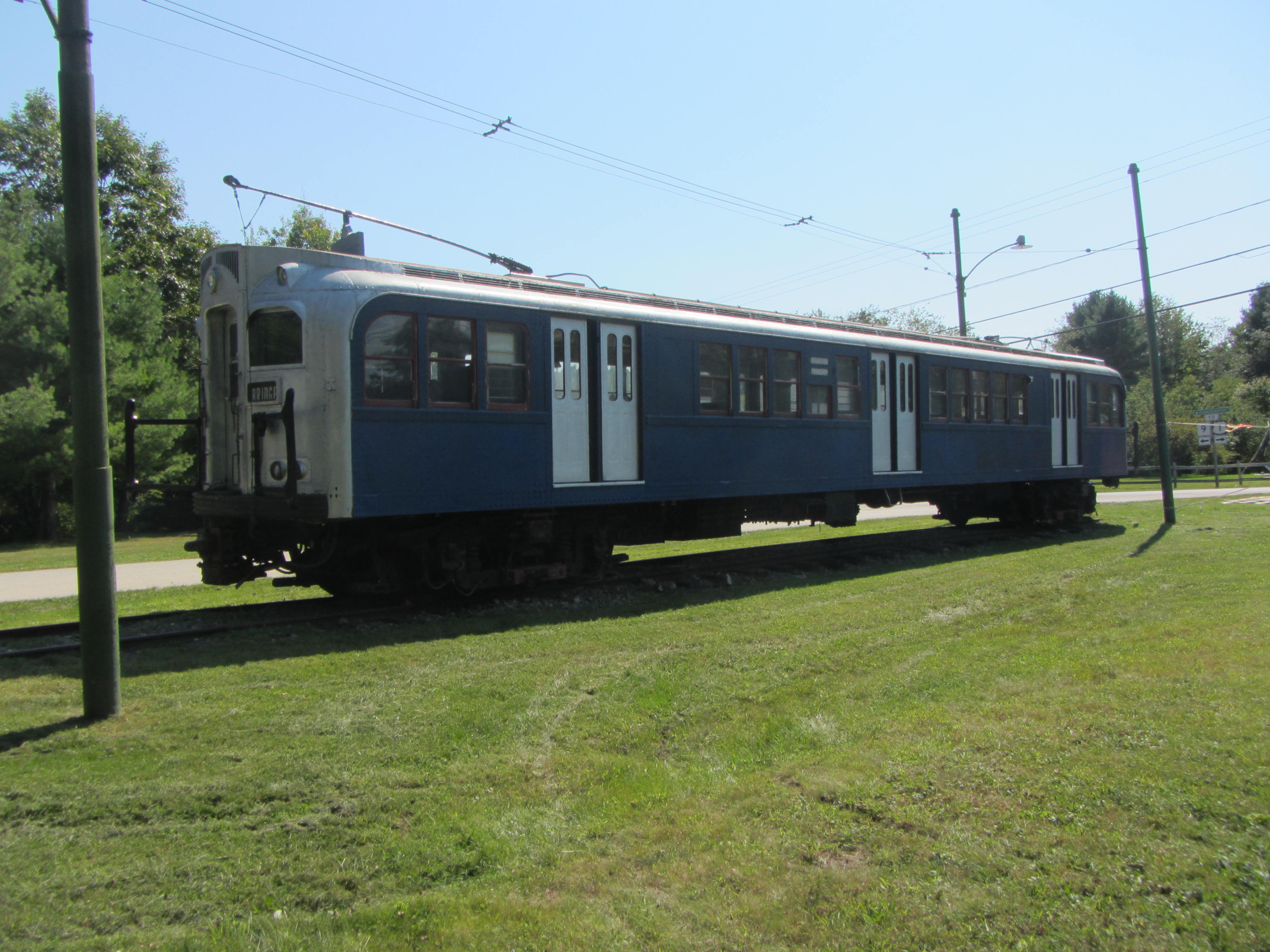
- Former Bridge Line car at the Seashore Trolley Museum in 2012

Overview
- First service: June 7, 1936
- Last service: December 28, 1968
- Successor: PATCO Speedline
- Former operator(s): Philadelphia Rapid Transit Company (1936–1940); Philadelphia Transportation Company (1940–1968); SEPTA (1968)

Route
- Termini: 15–16th & Locust; Broadway

The Bridge Line was a rapid transit service that connected Philadelphia, Pennsylvania with Camden, New Jersey. It opened for operation in 1936 and was replaced by the current PATCO Speedline in 1969. The line was owned by the Delaware River Port Authority and operated by the Philadelphia Transportation Company.

== History ==
In 1929, the state of New Jersey created the South Jersey Transit Commission to develop transit between Philadelphia, Pennsylvania and South Jersey. The commission recommended a rapid transit line between Philadelphia and Camden, New Jersey, running via the lower level of the Delaware River Bridge and connecting with the under-construction Broad–Ridge Spur at 8th–Market station.

The commission's other major recommendation led to the creation of the Pennsylvania-Reading Seashore Lines, a company jointly owned by the Pennsylvania Railroad and Reading Company which merged those companies operations in South Jersey. In Camden, the new rapid transit line would interchange with the Pennsylvania-Reading Seashore Lines at the new Broadway station.

The Delaware River Joint Commission, which managed the Delaware River Bridge, took ownership of the rapid transit project. The bridge had provisions, never used, for carrying streetcars, which could be repurposed for the line. The commission contracted with the Philadelphia Rapid Transit Company to operate the service. The first trains ran on June 7, 1936. The new line had four stations: 8th–Market, Franklin Square, City Hall, and Broadway.

The bankrupt Philadelphia Rapid Transit Company was reorganized as the Philadelphia Transportation Company in 1940 and continued as the operator of the Bridge Line. The line was extended west in 1953. The city of Philadelphia had begun the Locust Street Subway in 1918, but work stopped because of World War I. Work resumed in 1931 but was again left incomplete. The subway was finally opened between 8th–Market and 15–16th & Locust on February 15, 1953. Beginning in 1949 some services operated from Camden to Girard over the Broad–Ridge Spur, reversing at 8th–Market. These continued after the opening of the Locust extension.

=== PATCO Speedline ===
Various expansion proposals for the Bridge Line had been mooted since 1938. These finally took concrete form in 1962 under the Delaware River Port Authority, successor to the Delaware River Joint Commission. What became known as the PATCO Speedline would refurbish the existing Bridge Line while extending east over former Pennsylvania-Reading Seashore Lines right-of-way to Lindenwold. 8th–Market was rebuilt with a new stub-end platform for Broad–Ridge Spur trains, located above the existing Bridge Line platforms. The Philadelphia Transportation Company passed into public ownership in 1968 when SEPTA acquired it, leading to a brief period of SEPTA operating the Bridge Line. The DRPA had already created the Port Authority Transit Corporation (PATCO) to operate the rebuilt Bridge Line. The Bridge Line ceased operation on December 28, 1968.

== Rolling stock ==
The J. G. Brill Company delivered twenty-six subway cars prior to opening. These were mechanically compatible with the rolling stock on the Broad Street Line.
