= One Port Center =

Skyscraper in Camden

Coordinates: 39.945°N 75.131°W

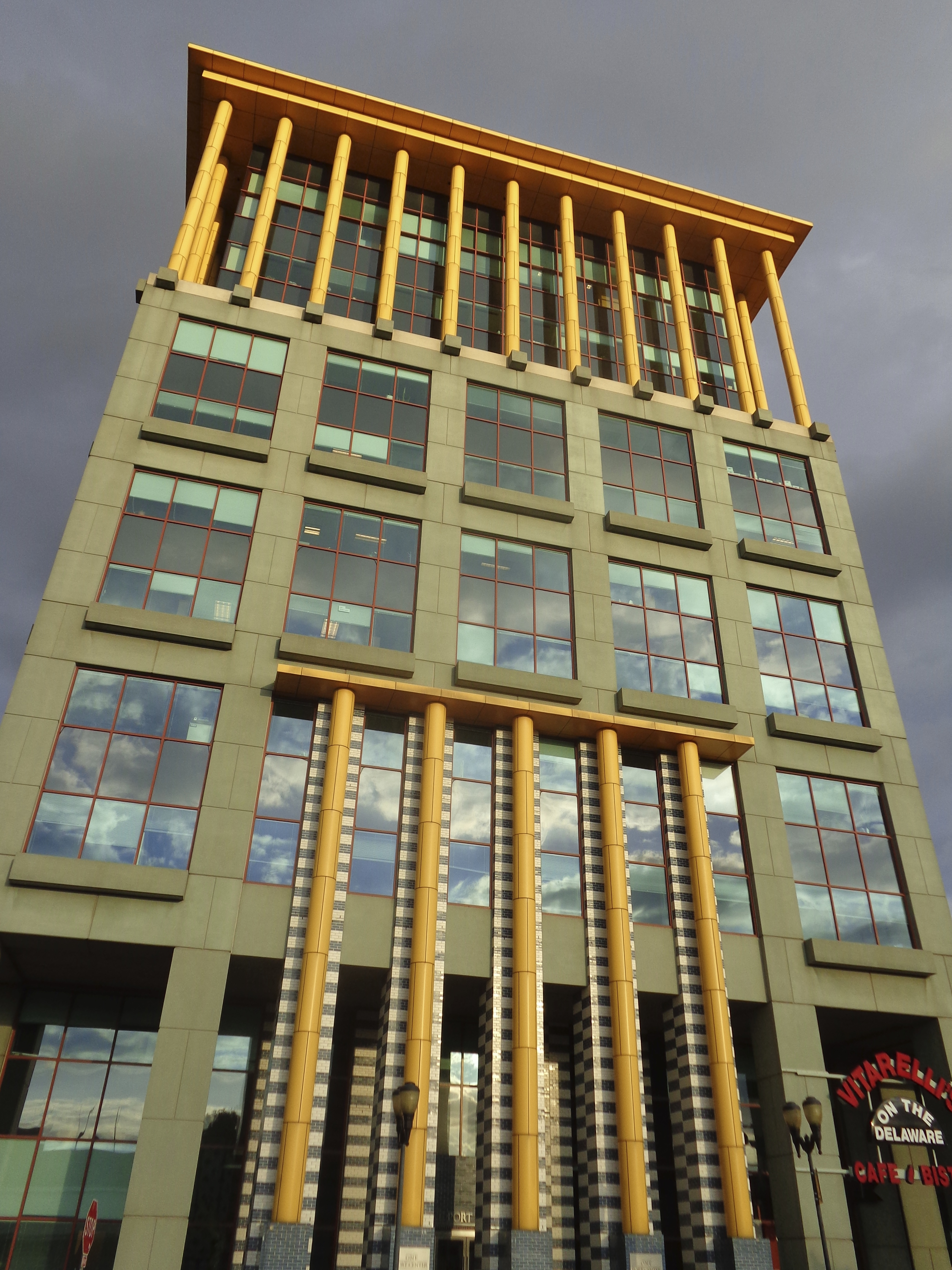
- One Port Center in September 2013
- Interactive map of the One Port Center area

General information
- Type: Commercial
- Location: 2 Riverside Drive; Camden, New Jersey, U.S.
- Completed: 1996
- Cost: $30 million

Height
- Roof: 41 m (135 ft)

Technical details
- Floor count: 11
- Floor area: 175,000 sq ft (16,300 m^{2})

Design and construction
- Architect: Michael Graves

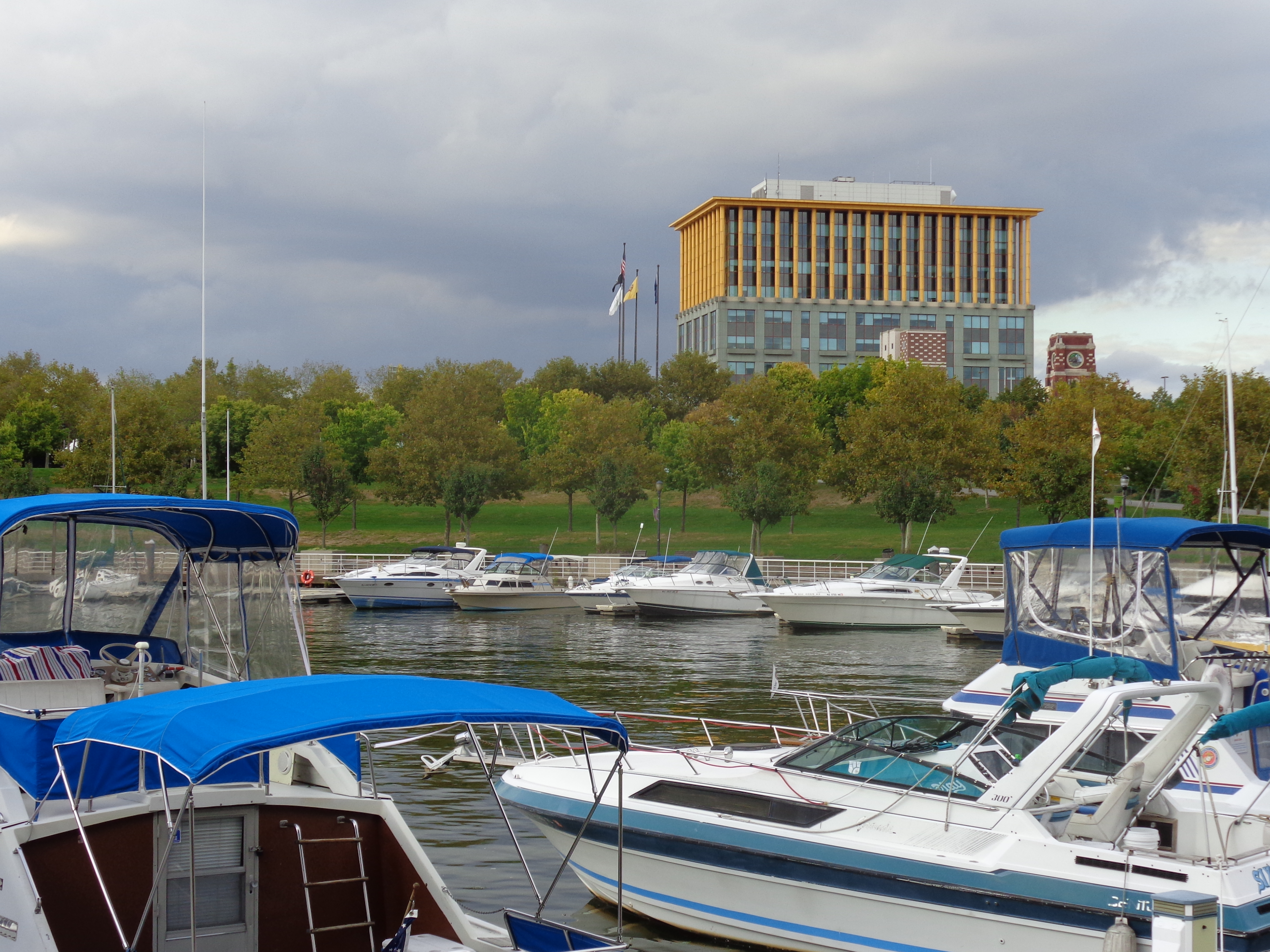
One Port Center as seen from Wiggins Park Marina near the Port of Camden

One Port Center is an office building in Camden, New Jersey located in the Camden Waterfront. The building, opened in 1996, was designed by Michael Graves and is headquarters to the Delaware River Port Authority.

The building is situated on a L-shaped site flanks an existing parking garage, the other of which side is a planned future companion building. The location offers panoramic views of the Delaware River and Philadelphia. The eleven-story, 176,000-square-foot building accommodates retail shops and a restaurant at the ground floor. There are four floors of leased office space and six floors of offices for the Port Authority. The executive offices and boardroom are located on the top floor behind three-story yellow aluminum composite columns. The blue and white glazed brick used at the lower speaks to the waterfront location.

In 2021, DRPA installed a 1 MW solar canopy covering its parking lot.

== See also ==
- List of tallest buildings in Camden
