= Bird collision =

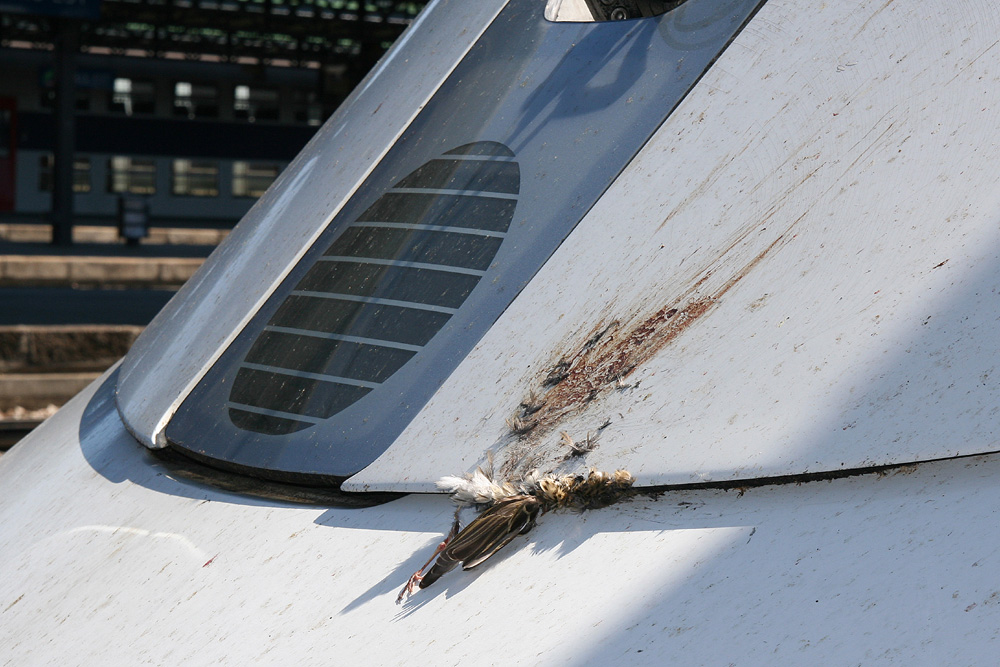
Bird strike on an ICE 3 high-speed train

Bird collision may refer to:

- Bird–skyscraper collisions
- Towerkill: due to antenna towers and masts
- Bird strike with cars or planes
