= Delaware River Port Authority =

Pennsylvania and New Jersey bi-state transport agency

Coordinates: 39.94397°N 75.13000°W

Delaware River Port Authority of Pennsylvania and New Jersey
- Abbreviation: DRPA
- Formation: July 17, 1952
- Type: Bi-state authority Congressionally-approved interstate compact entity
- Headquarters: One Port Center; Camden, New Jersey, U.S.
- Region served: Pennsylvania and New Jersey, including Philadelphia, Camden, and its surrounding regions
- Chairman: Jim Schultz
- Chief executive officer: John T. Hanson
- Website: drpa.org

The Delaware River Port Authority (DRPA), officially the Delaware River Port Authority of Pennsylvania and New Jersey, is a bi-state agency instrumentality created by a congressionally approved interstate compact between the state governments of Pennsylvania and New Jersey. The authority is principally charged with maintaining and developing transportation links between the two states, including four bridges and a mass transit rail line across the Delaware River. Although the DRPA has "port" in its name, it does not own or operate any ports.

== History ==
DRPA's flag

In 1919, the Pennsylvania and New Jersey legislatures approved the creation of the Delaware River Joint Commission to oversee the construction of a road bridge over the Delaware River between Philadelphia, Pennsylvania and Camden, New Jersey. The Delaware River Bridge (now the Benjamin Franklin Bridge) opened on July 1, 1926. On June 7, 1936, the Bridge Line rapid transit line began operation, using the lower deck of the Delaware River Bridge. The Philadelphia Rapid Transit Company operated the line on behalf of the Joint Commission.

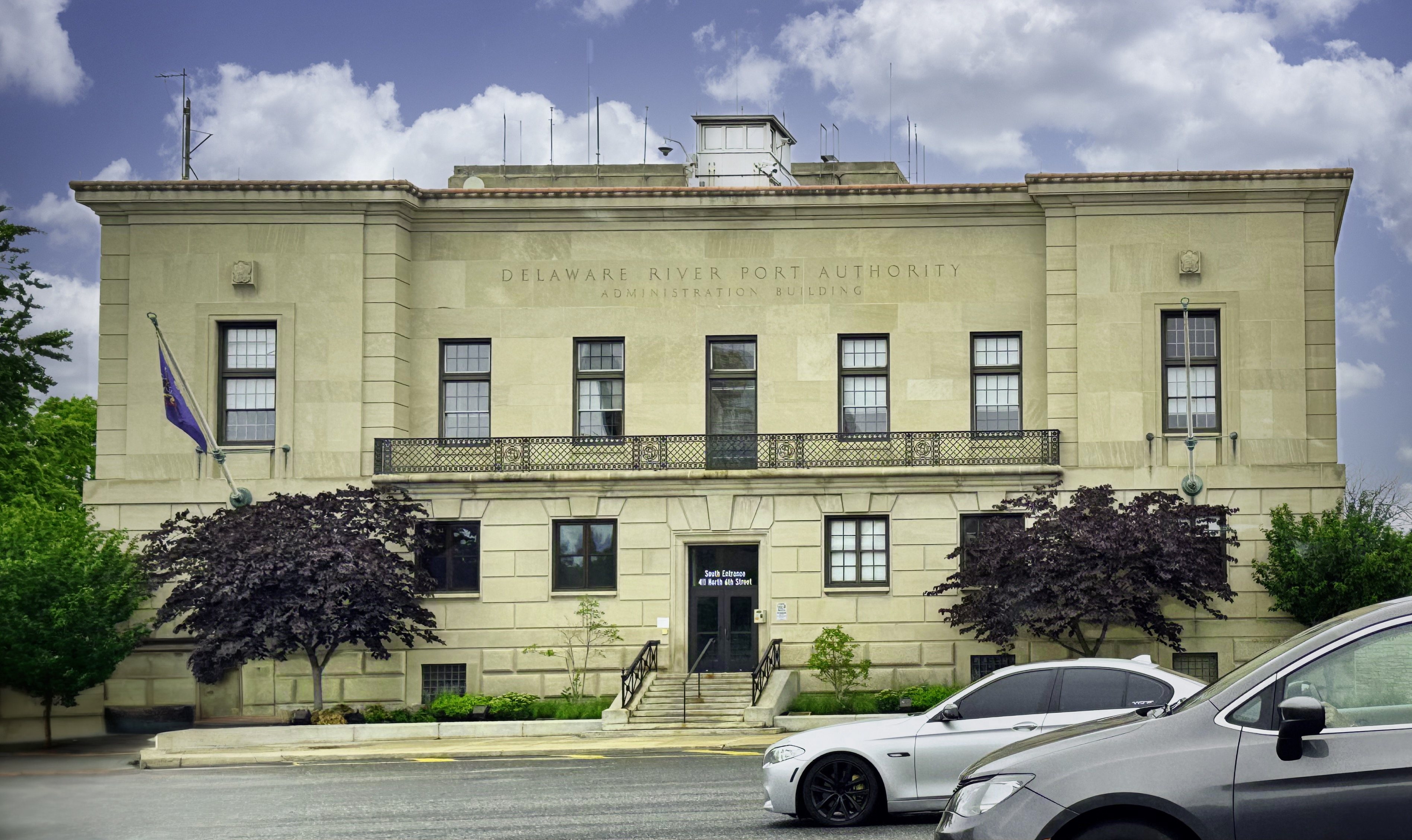
The Delaware River Port Authority administration building in Camden

On July 17, 1952, United States President Harry S. Truman signed a bill that created the Delaware River Port Authority, replacing the Joint Commission. In 1953, construction started on a new bridge to connect South Philadelphia and Gloucester City. In 1955, the existing bridge was renamed the Benjamin Franklin Bridge, while the name Walt Whitman Bridge was approved for the new bridge, which opened in 1957. By 1966, two more bridges were approved: the Commodore Barry Bridge (opened February 1, 1974) and the Betsy Ross Bridge (opened April 30, 1976). In 1974 and 1990, the Ben Franklin Bridge and the Walt Whitman Bridge carried their one billionth vehicle.

In 2011, DRPA ceased operating the Philadelphia Cruise Terminal. In 2015, DRPA sold the RiverLink Ferry to the Delaware River Waterfront Corporation and the Cooper's Ferry Partnership.

In 2022, the DRPA installed more than 20 MW of solar panels at its facilities, built by TotalEnergies. The Lindenwold, Ashland, Woodcrest, and Ferry Avenue PATCO stations, as well as the Betsy Ross Bridge, Commodore Barry Bridge, and DRPA's headquarters in Camden, have large solar canopies covering their parking lots. These will provide more than half of the DRPA's electricity usage and save it $12 million over a 20-year PPA contract.

== Board of Commissioners ==
Sixteen commissioners govern the Delaware River Port Authority, eight representing New Jersey and Pennsylvania. All eight New Jersey commissioners are appointed by the governor of New Jersey, and six Pennsylvania commissioners are appointed by the governor of Pennsylvania. The Pennsylvania treasurer and the Pennsylvania auditor general serve as ex officio commissioners. These two officers are elected officials.

The 16 commissioners also serve as the board of directors of the Port Authority Transit Corporation (PATCO), a DRPA subsidiary.

== Facilities ==
=== Bridges ===
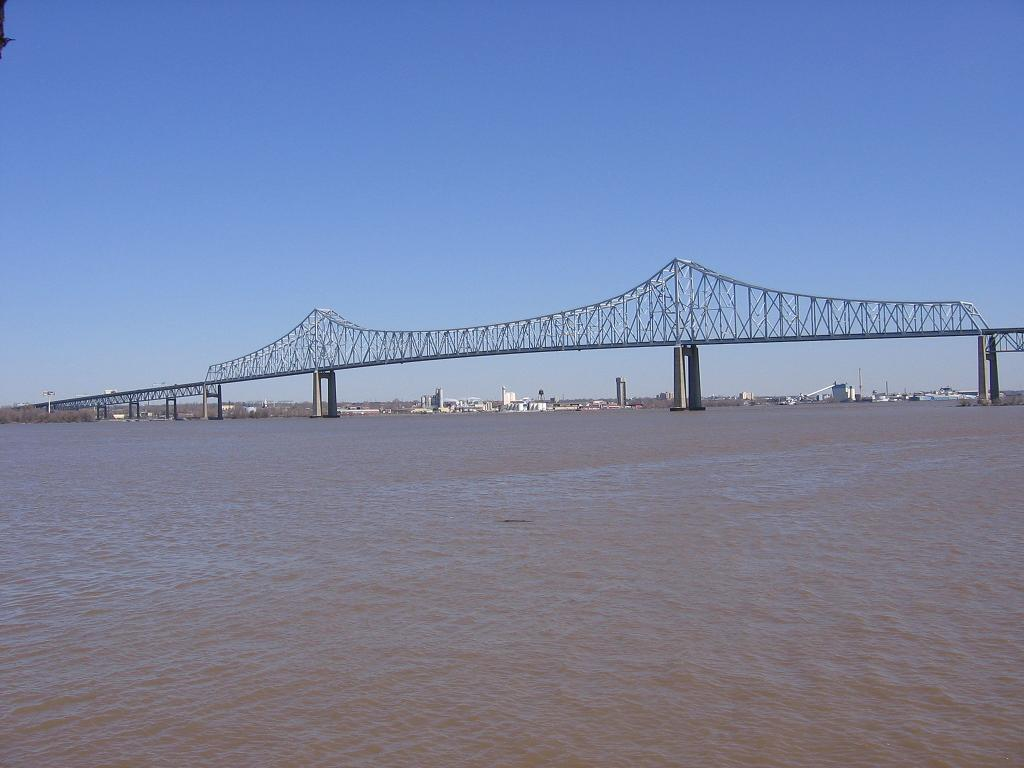
Commodore Barry Bridge

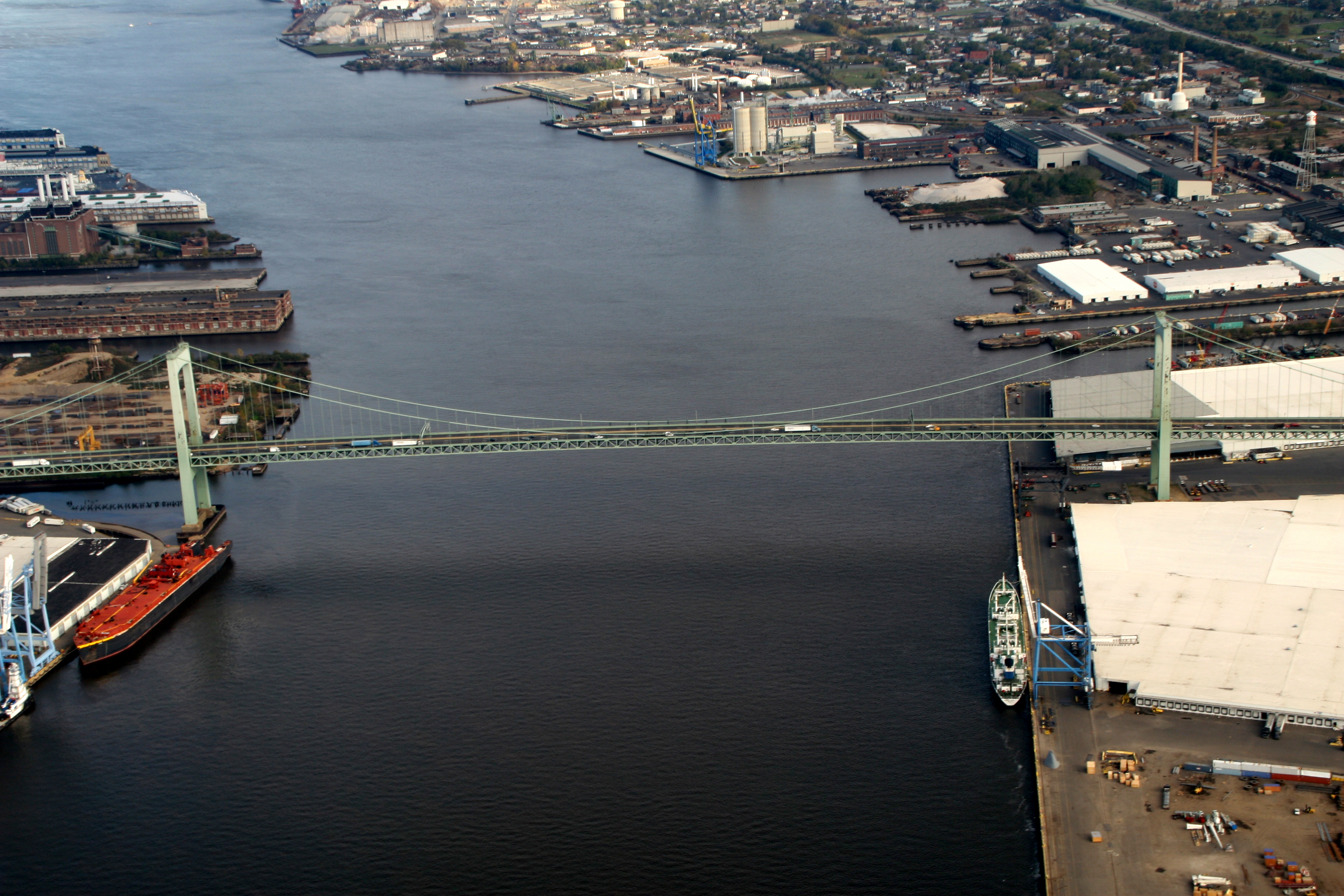
Walt Whitman Bridge

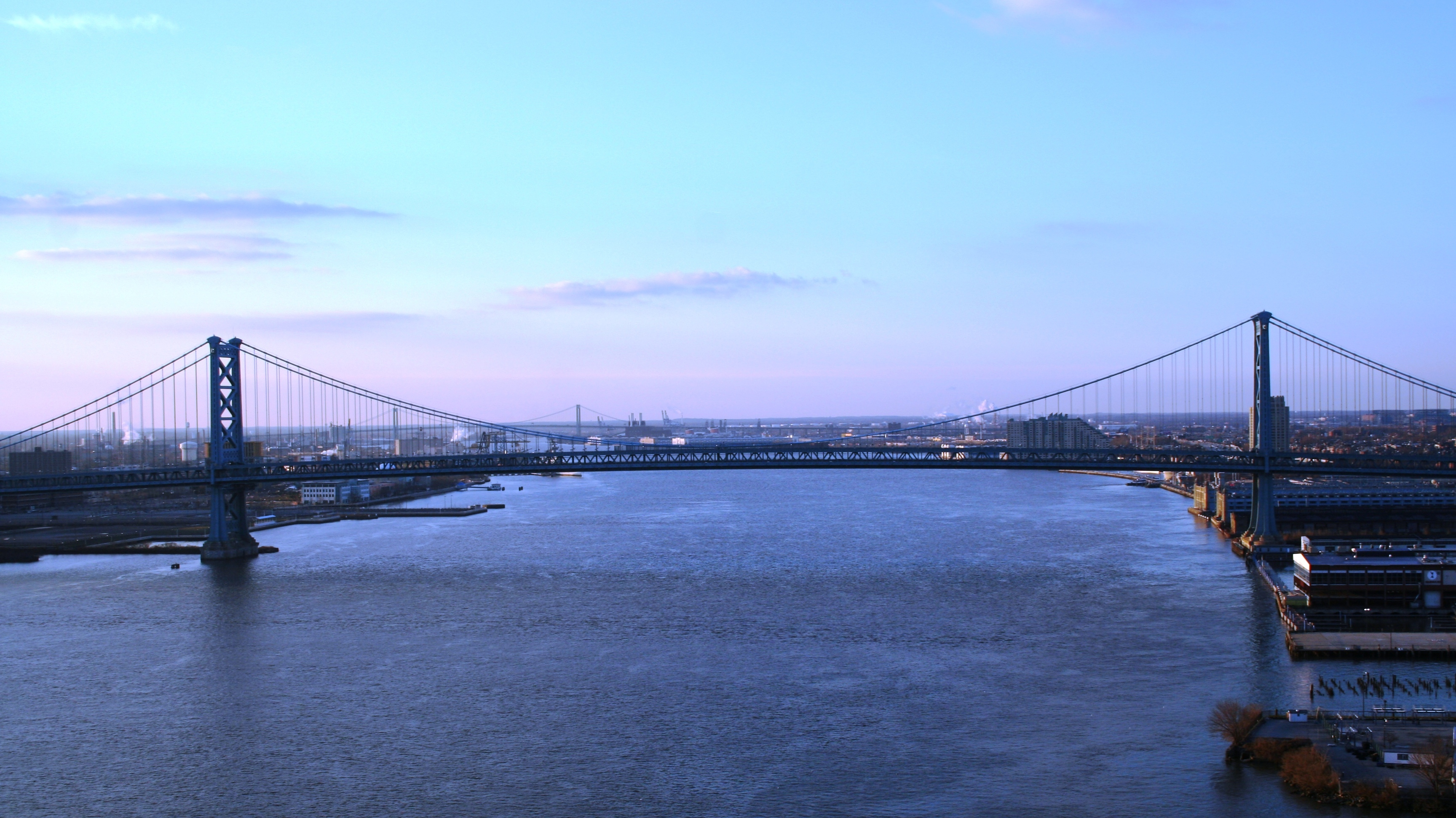
Benjamin Franklin Bridge

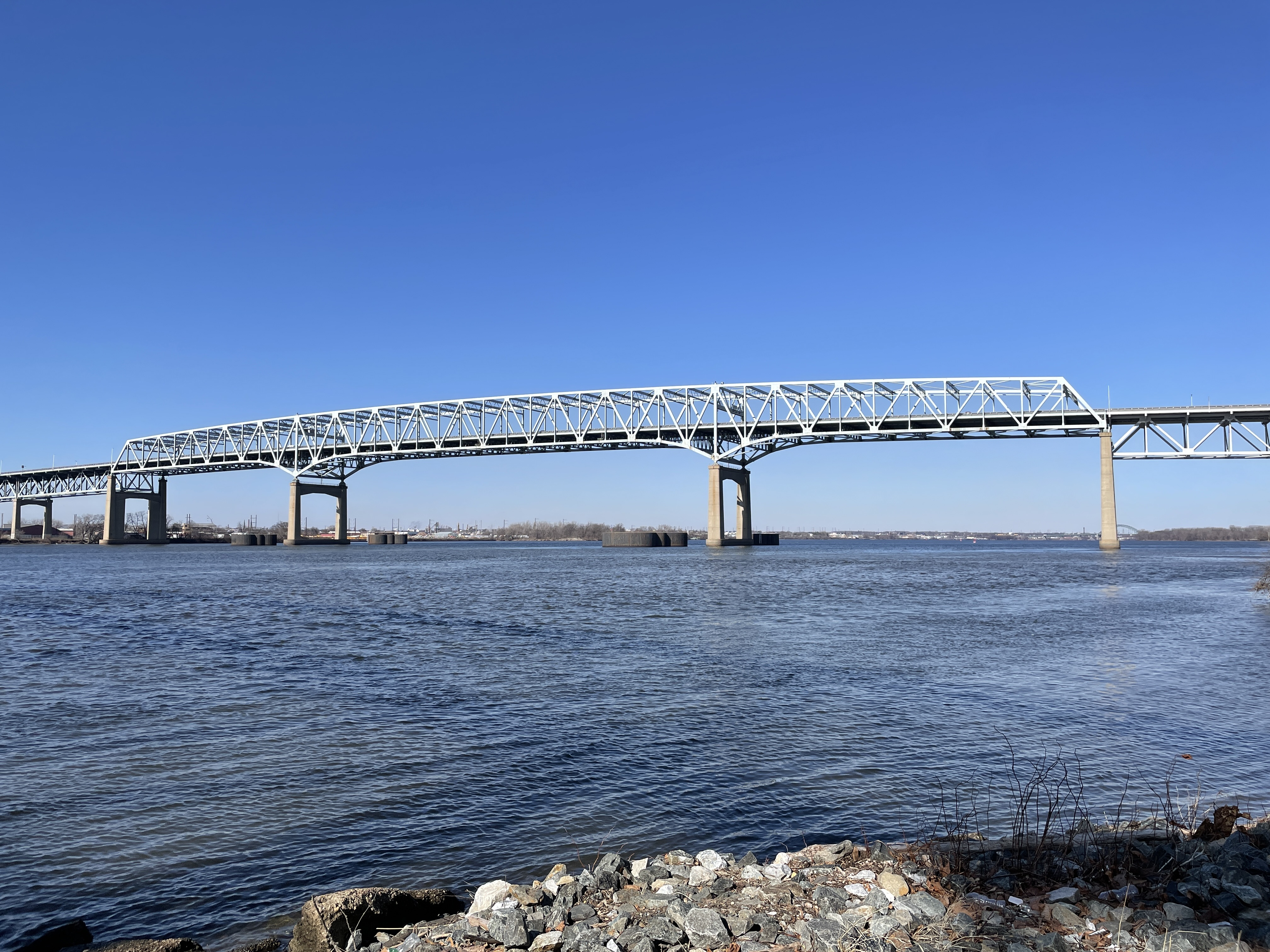
Betsy Ross Bridge

The DRPA operates and maintains four bridges that cross the Delaware River between Pennsylvania and New Jersey. All four bridges charge a $6 westbound toll. From southwest to northeast, they are:

- Commodore Barry Bridge – Completed in 1974, the longest of the four bridges. It connects Chester, Pennsylvania with Bridgeport, New Jersey. It carries U.S. Route 322 and New Jersey County Route 536. It is the last crossing of the Delaware River between New Jersey and Pennsylvania; the next crossing, to the south, is the Delaware Memorial Bridge between New Jersey and Delaware.
- Walt Whitman Bridge – The most heavily traveled of the four bridges, the Walt Whitman Bridge connects South Philadelphia to Gloucester City, New Jersey, and carries Interstate 76. For passengers going to Pennsylvania from New Jersey, traffic is heaviest during sports contests, as the South Philadelphia Sports Complex is at the foot of the bridge. For passengers going into New Jersey from Pennsylvania, it sees its heaviest volume of traffic from Memorial Day Weekend through Labor Day, as the Walt Whitman provides access via I-76 and New Jersey Route 42 to the Atlantic City Expressway, and thus to shore points in South Jersey, where many Philadelphia-area residents have shore houses or go for a day trip.
- Benjamin Franklin Bridge – The first completed bridge out of the four (opened in 1926) carries U.S. Route 30 and Interstate 676, as well as the PATCO Speedline. The bridge connects Camden, New Jersey with Center City, Philadelphia. It held the position of the World's longest suspension bridge from 1926 to 1929 until being surpassed by the Ambassador Bridge.
- Betsy Ross Bridge – The youngest of the four bridges (opened 1976), it connects the Bridesburg section of Philadelphia to Pennsauken. It carries New Jersey Route 90. Arriving in Pennsylvania, it directly intersects with I-95.

=== Public transportation ===
- PATCO Speedline (rapid transit line)

=== Real estate ===
- One Port Center, Camden, New Jersey

=== Former ===
- AmeriPort Intermodal (Closed rail yard)
- RiverLink Ferry (now operated by Delaware River Waterfront Corporation)
- Philadelphia Cruise Terminal (Opened in 1998 and closed in 2011)
- Skylink (aerial tramway, partially built and then abandoned)

== Police Department ==
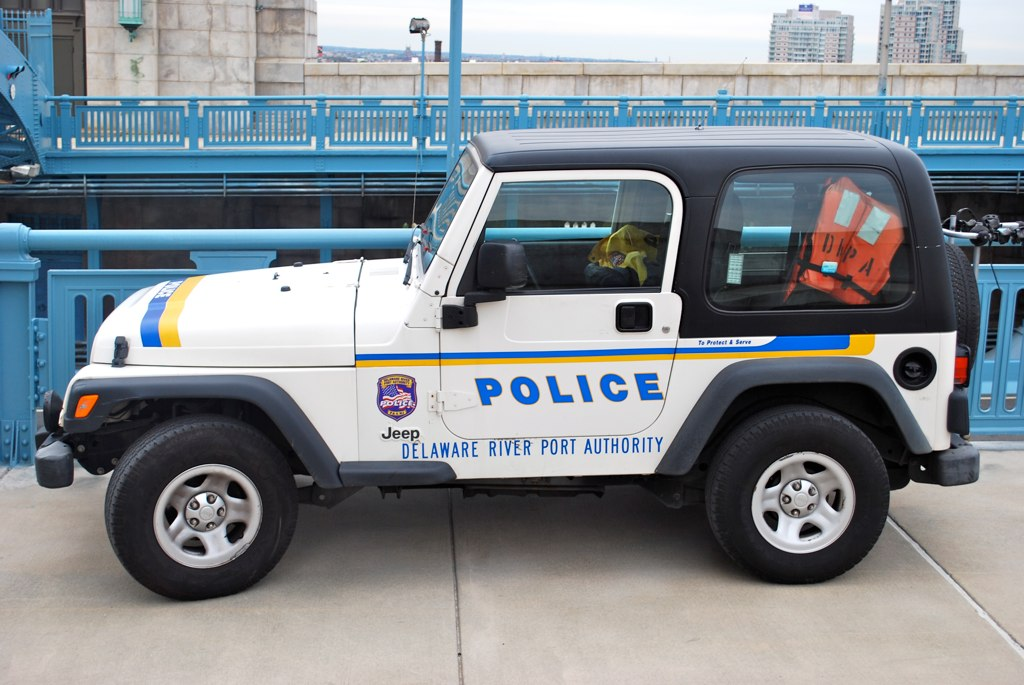
A DRPA police jeep

The DRPA Police Department provides police services on all DRPA properties, including all Port Authority Transit Corporation (PATCO) locations and trains.

== See also ==
- Interstate compact
- List of crossings of the Delaware River
- Delaware River Joint Toll Bridge Commission (another bi-state agency of New Jersey and Pennsylvania that operates bridges further north on the Delaware River)
- Delaware River and Bay Authority (a bi-state agency of Delaware and New Jersey that operates bridges further south on the Delaware River)
- Port Authority of New York and New Jersey (a bi-state agency of New York and New Jersey that also operates a rapid transit line, PATH)
