= Benjamin Franklin Bridge =

Suspension bridge between Philadelphia, Pennsylvania and Camden, New Jersey

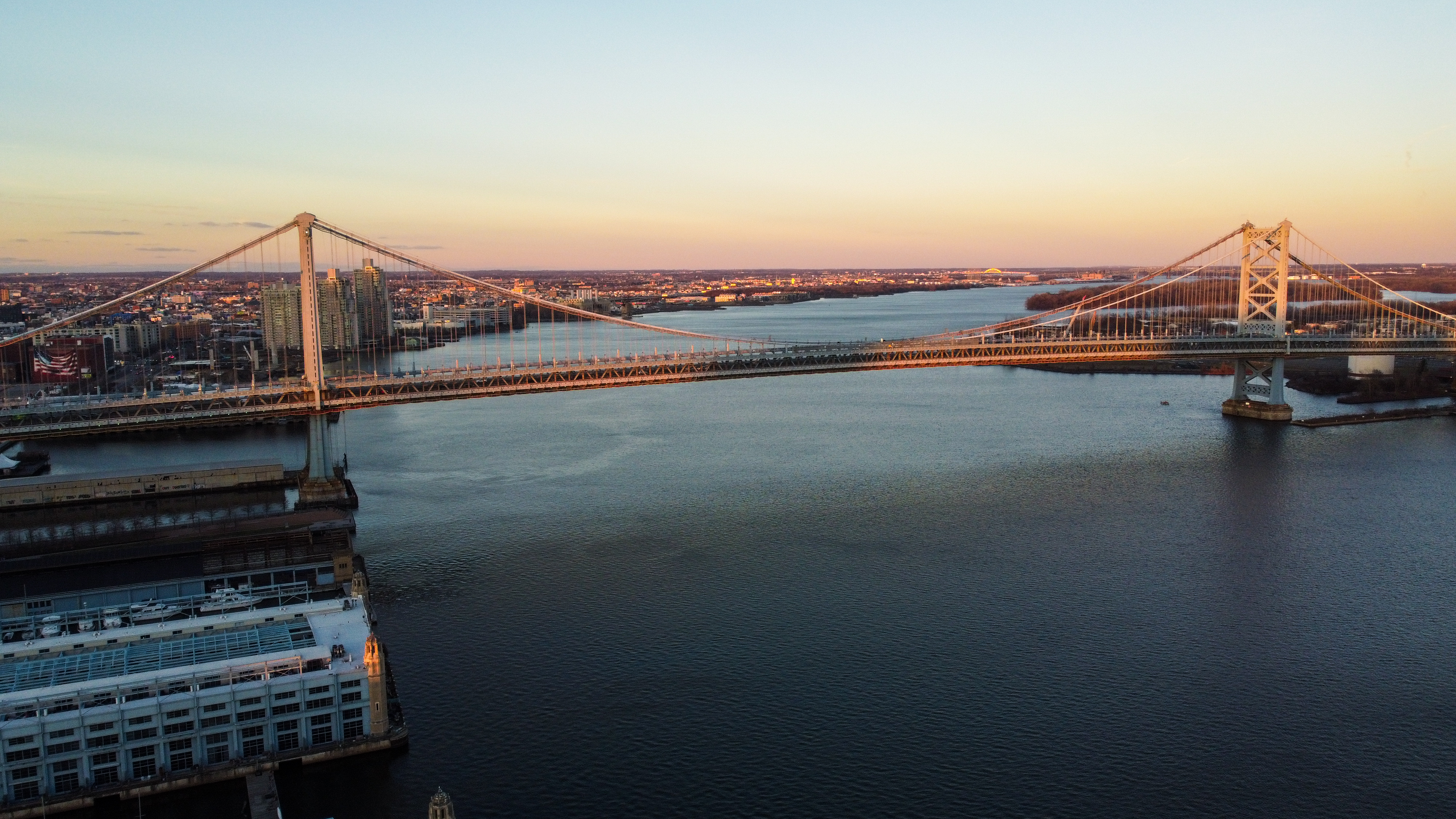
- Benjamin Franklin Bridge at sunset in February 2023
- Coordinates: 39.953°N 75.134°W
- Carries: 7 lanes of I-676 / US 30, 2 PATCO railroad tracks, and 2 sidewalks
- Crosses: Delaware River
- Locale: Philadelphia, Pennsylvania to Camden, New Jersey
- Official name: Benjamin Franklin Bridge
- Other name: Ben Franklin Bridge
- Named for: Benjamin Franklin
- Maintained by: Delaware River Port Authority of Pennsylvania and New Jersey
- ID number: 4500010

Characteristics
- Design: Steel suspension bridge
- Total length: 9,650 feet (2,940 m)
- Width: 128 feet (39 m)
- Height: 385 feet (117 m)
- Longest span: 1,750 feet (530 m)
- Clearance above: 135 feet (41 m)
- Clearance below: 41.19 feet (12.55 m)

History
- Construction cost: $37,103,765
- Opened: July 1, 1926; 100 years ago

Statistics
- Daily traffic: 100,000
- Toll: Cars $6.00; trucks over 7,000 lbs $9.00/axle; buses $4.50/axle (westbound) (E-ZPass)

Philadelphia Register of Historic Places
- Official name: Benjamin Franklin Bridge over the Delaware River
- Designated: December 12, 2003

Location
- Interactive map of Benjamin Franklin Bridge

The Benjamin Franklin Bridge, originally named the Delaware River Bridge and known locally as the Ben Franklin Bridge, is a suspension bridge across the Delaware River connecting Philadelphia, Pennsylvania and Camden, New Jersey. Owned and operated by the Delaware River Port Authority, it is one of four primary vehicular bridges between Philadelphia and southern New Jersey, along with the Betsy Ross, Walt Whitman, and Tacony-Palmyra bridges. It carries Interstate 676/U.S. Route 30, pedestrians/cyclists, and the PATCO Speedline.

The bridge was dedicated as part of the 1926 Sesquicentennial Exposition, celebrating the 150th anniversary of the signing of the United States Declaration of Independence. From 1926 to 1929, it had the longest single span of any suspension bridge in the world.

== History ==
=== 19th century ===
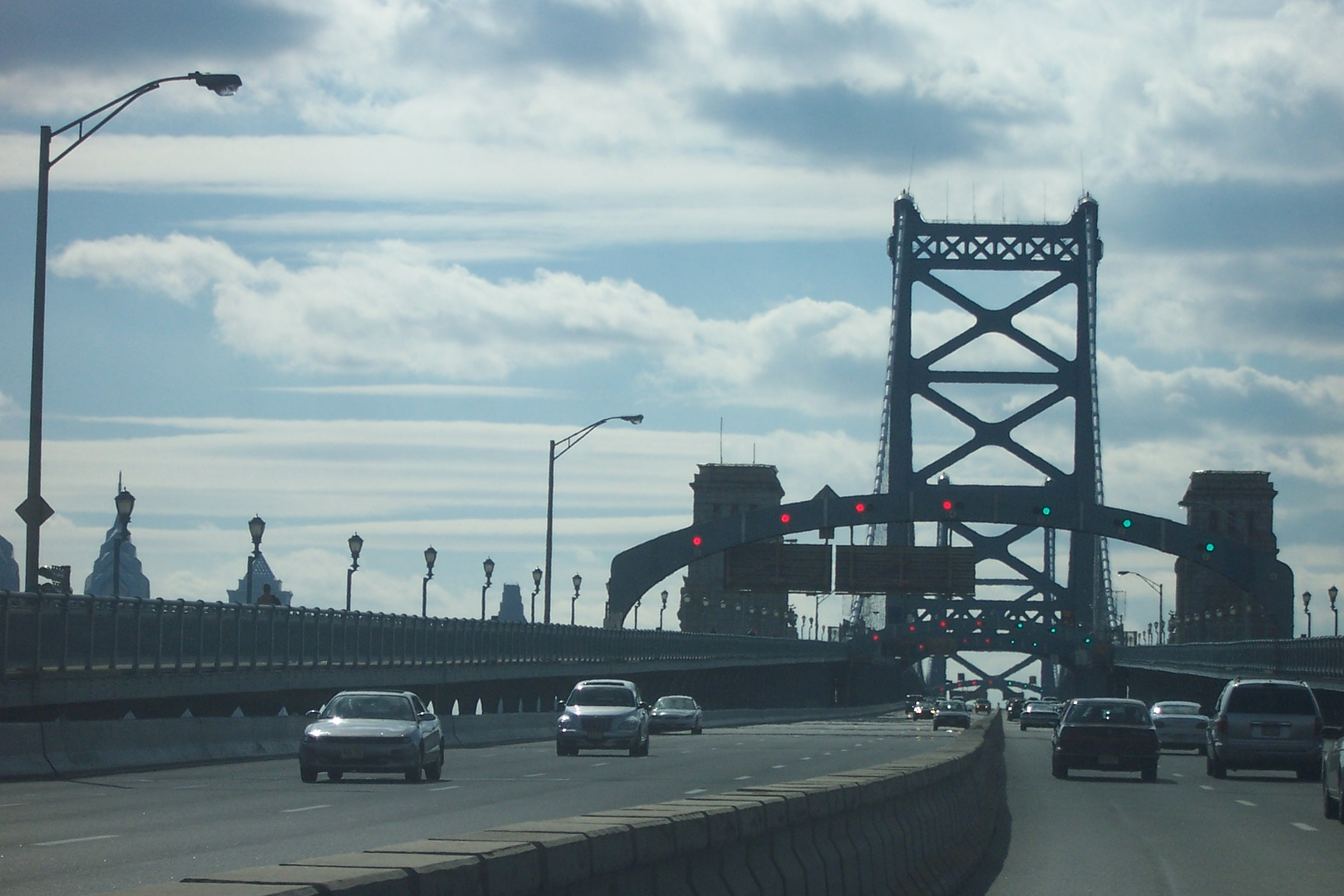
The westbound approach to the bridge shows the zipper barrier and the overhead gantry lights in May 2005

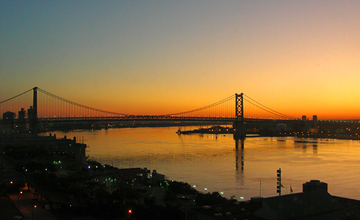
Ben Franklin Bridge at sunrise in September 2009

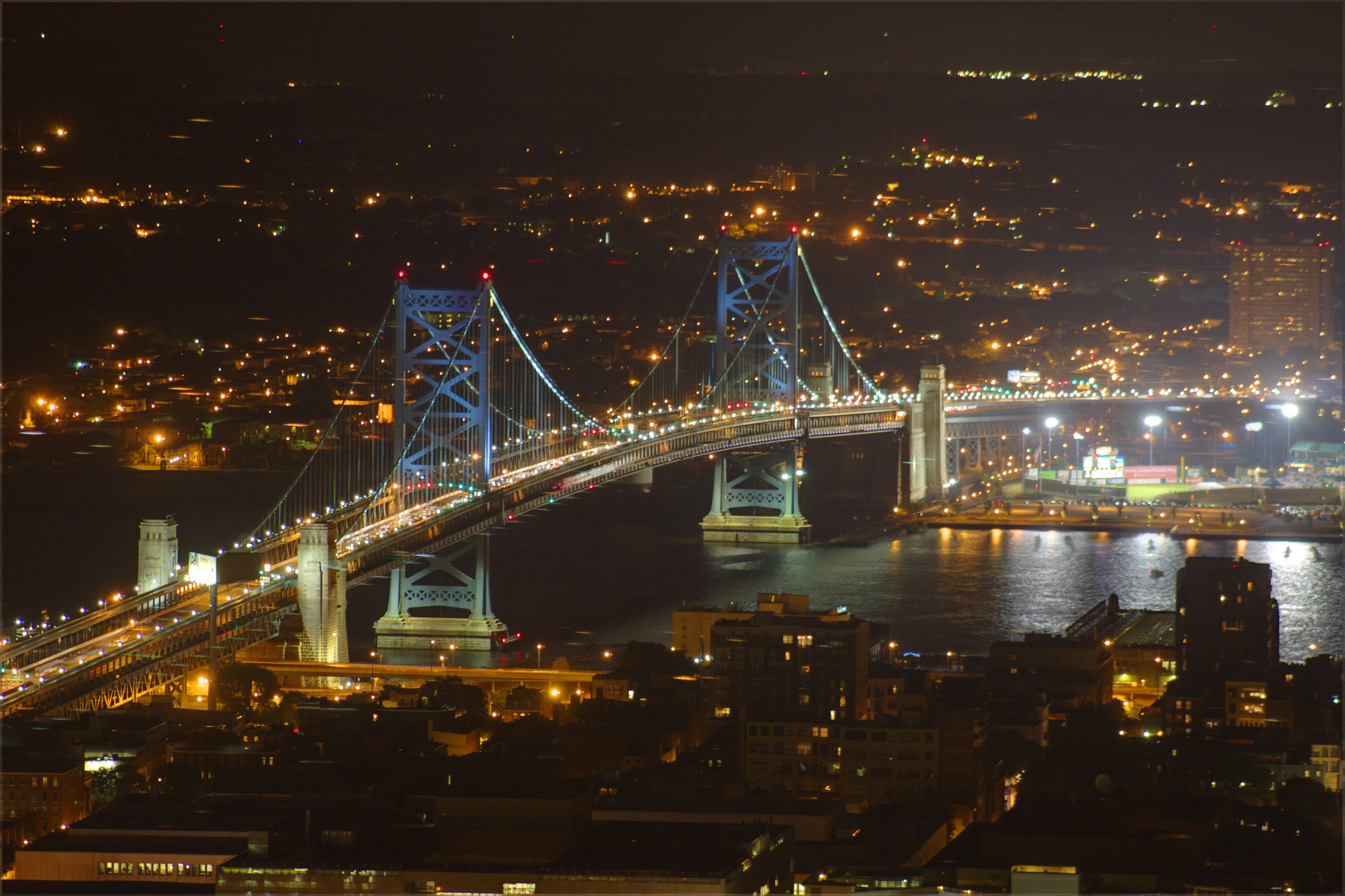
Ben Franklin Bridge at night in June 2010

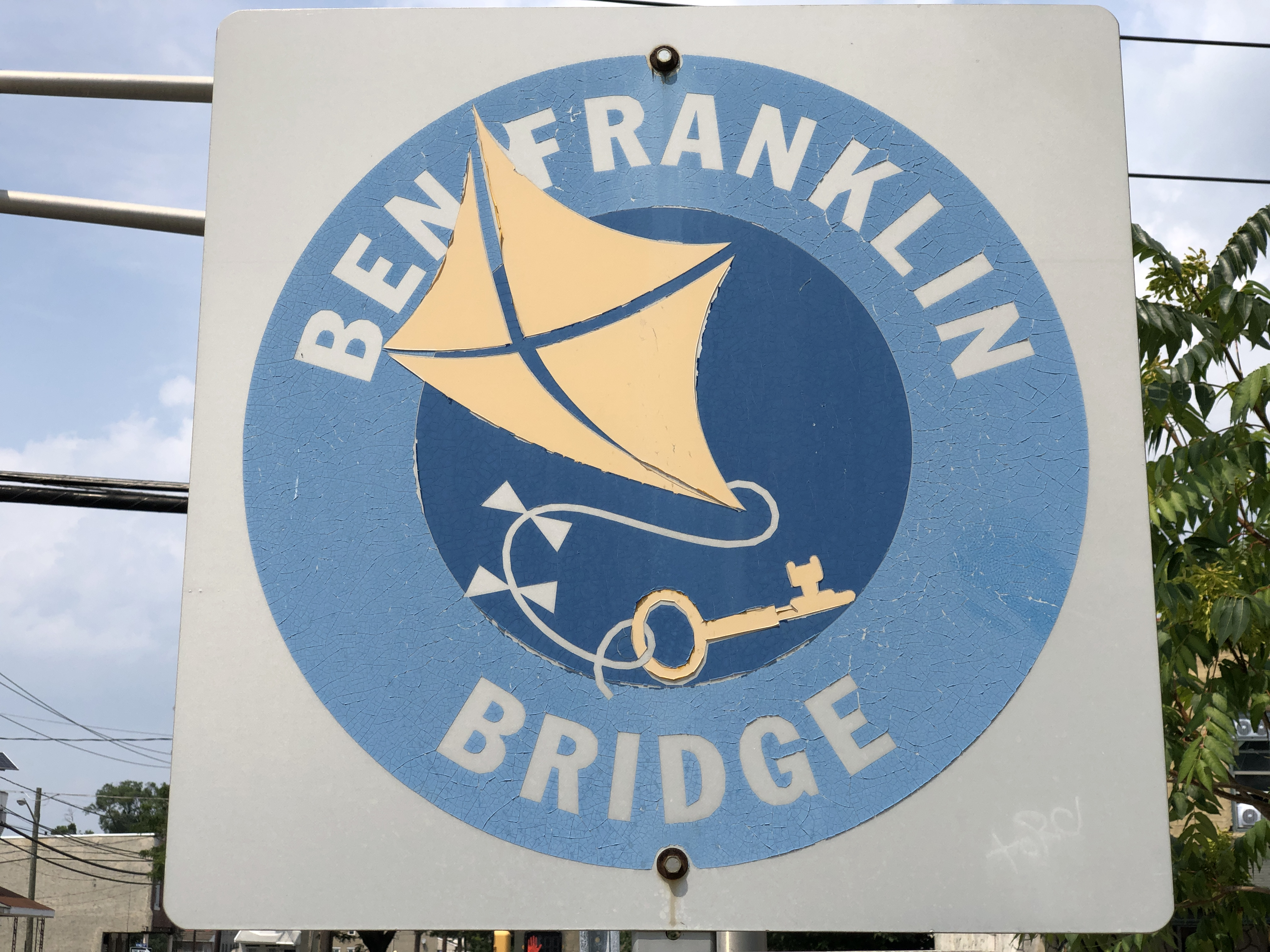
Sign for the bridge on Penn Street in Camden in July 2021

Plans for a bridge to augment the ferries across the Delaware River began as early as 1818, when one plan envisioned using Smith Island, a narrow island off the Philadelphia shore that was removed in 1893. Local engineer John C. Trautwine proposed a four-span suspension bridge in 1851. In 1868, a committee of Philadelphia and Camden interests proposed a unique design with two parallel low-level drawbridge spans allowing ships to pass in stages without interrupting traffic across the bridge. A later proposal by John Alexander Low Waddell employed helical approaches to avoid purchasing expensive land for approaches to a high-level suspension bridge. None of these proposals were constructed.

=== 20th century ===
The Delaware River Bridge Joint Commission, now the Delaware River Port Authority, was created in 1919 to find a permanent solution.

The chief engineer of the bridge was Polish-born Ralph Modjeski, the design engineer was Leon Moisseiff, the supervising architect was Paul Philippe Cret, and the construction engineer was Montgomery B. Case. Work began on January 6, 1922.

At the peak of construction, 1,300 people worked on the bridge, and 15 died during its construction. The bridge was originally painted by a commercial painting company owned by David A. Salkind, of Philadelphia, which also painted the Golden Gate Bridge. The bridge opened to traffic on July 1, 1926, three days ahead of its scheduled opening on the nation's 150th anniversary. At completion, its 1,750-foot (533-meter) span was the world's longest for a suspension bridge, a distinction it held until the opening of the Ambassador Bridge connecting Detroit, Michigan, with Windsor, Ontario, Canada, in 1929.

The name was changed to "Benjamin Franklin Bridge" in 1955, since a second Delaware River suspension bridge connecting Philadelphia and New Jersey, the Walt Whitman Bridge, was under construction.

=== 21st century ===
The bridge was closed to vehicles on July 1, 2001, to allow pedestrians to celebrate its 75th anniversary, and again on July 11, 2026, to celebrate its 100th.

== Uses ==
=== Rail ===
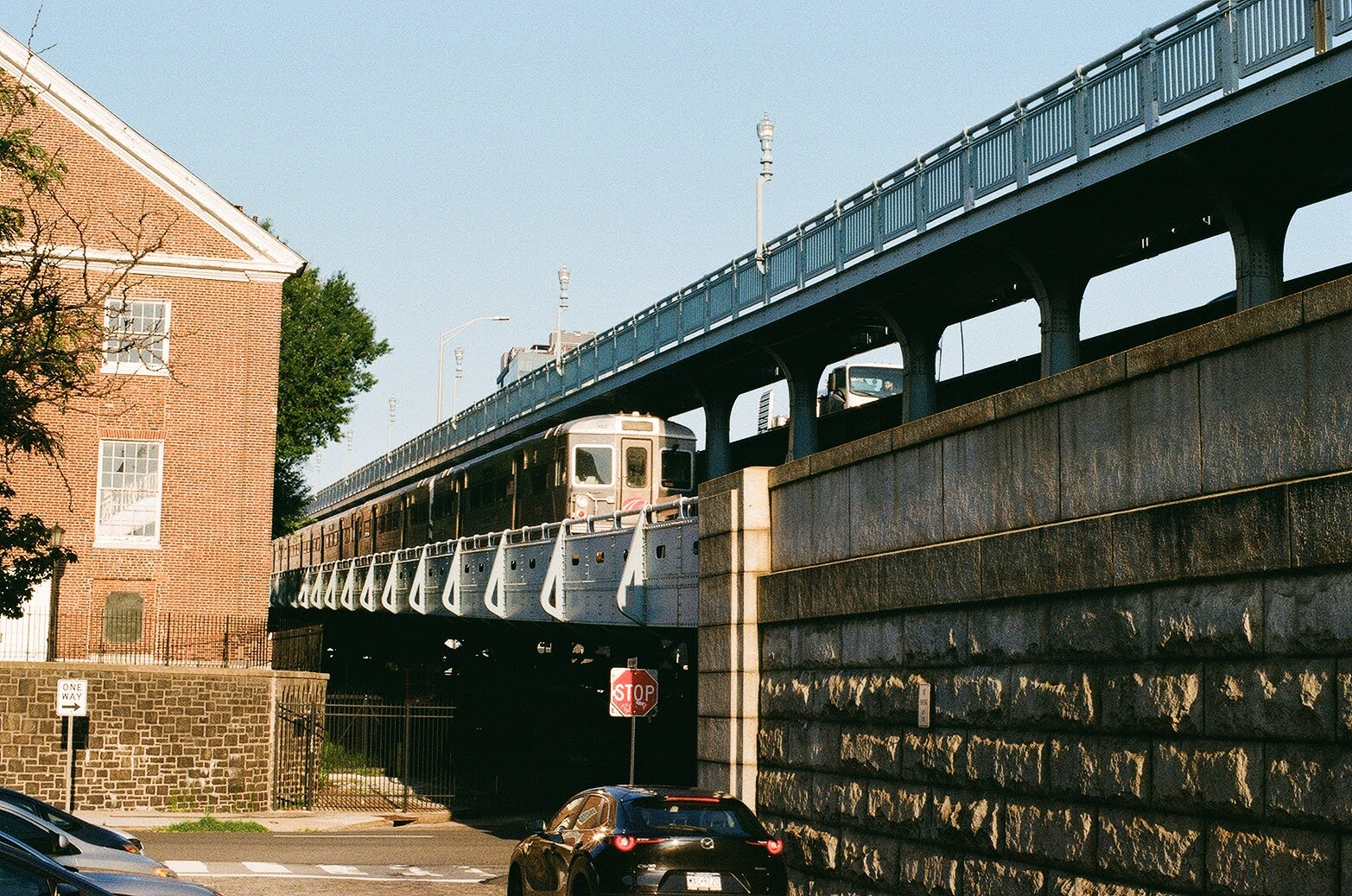
The PATCO High Speed Line coming into Philadelphia as it finishes crossing the Ben Franklin Bridge

The bridge originally included six vehicle lanes and two streetcar tracks on the main deck, with provision for a rapid transit track in each direction outboard of the deck's stiffening trusses, which rise above the deck rather than lie beneath it. The tracks were built to the nonstandard broad gauge of the Public Service Corporation of New Jersey's Camden streetcar system; the design called for the streetcars to cross the bridge from Camden to Philadelphia, enter an underground terminal beneath the bridge's west entrance plaza, and return to Camden via the opposite track. Streetcar stations were also built in the bridge's anchorages. None of the streetcar facilities were ever placed in service, as Public Service ran no cars across the bridge from its opening until the company abandoned its Camden streetcar system in 1932; after that, the tracks were removed, and the space was converted to vehicular lanes.

The outer pair of rapid transit tracks went into service in 1936 with the opening of the Bridge Line subway connecting Broadway and City Hall in Camden with 8th and Market Streets in Philadelphia. The Bridge Line, extended to 16th and Locust in 1952, began carrying PATCO trains in 1969. Today, it carries the PATCO Speedline, which descends into tunnels on both sides of the bridge. The Eastbound and Westbound railroad tracks and support structures were reconstructed from June 2014 and finished in October 2014.

=== Roads ===
The bridge carries highways I-676 and US 30, but only the New Jersey section of the bridge carries I-676, as the section of the bridge approaches on the Pennsylvania side are not up to interstate highway standards, including at-grade traffic crossings. The Pennsylvania section of I-676 (which runs east–west, and not north–south as New Jersey's I-676 does) ends at the ramps to I-95. However, I-676 is signed across the bridge from both sides to be less confusing to drivers. Before the 1953 New Jersey state highway renumbering, New Jersey Route 25 (Route 25), Route 43, and Route 45 ended in the middle of the bridge, and I-76 was signed on the bridge until 1972, when it switched routings with I-676, which until then ran across the Walt Whitman Bridge.

==== "Zipper" barrier ====
The seven vehicular lanes are divided by a concrete "zipper" barrier, which can be mechanically moved to configure the lanes for traffic volume or construction. Red and green signals mounted on overhead gantries indicate which lanes are open or closed to traffic in each direction. The lights indicate closures for construction, accidents or breakdown as well as traffic separation. Generally, there are four lanes open westbound and three eastbound during the morning rush hour, with the situation reversed during the evening rush hour. Before the zipper barrier was installed in 2000-2001, one lane of the bridge was kept closed at peak times to reduce the risk of head-on collisions as there was no physical barrier separating east and westbound traffic.

==== Tolls ====
Effective July 2011, one-way tolls to cross the bridge are charged in the westbound (towards Pennsylvania) direction. The charges include:

- A $6.00 toll is charged to westbound passenger vehicles (7,000 lb (3,200 kg) or less gross vehicle weight).
- Trucks, commercial vehicles, mobile homes, and recreation vehicles (weighing over 7,000 lb (3,200 kg) gross vehicle weight), pay $9.00 per axle.
- Seniors aged 65 and older can use a discount program integrated with E-ZPass to pay $3.00 per trip.

On July 17, 2024, the DRPA approved an increase in the toll for passenger vehicles from $5.00 to $6.00, which went into effect on September 1, 2024.

=== Proposed Camden-Philadelphia BRT ===
There are proposals for a Camden-Philadelphia BRT, a bus rapid transit system between the two cities extending into Camden and Gloucester counties that would use the bridge.

=== Walkways ===
Pedestrian walkways run along both sides of the bridge, elevated over and separated from the vehicular lanes; of these, only one is open at a time. The DRPA temporarily closed the walkways to the public the day after the 7 July 2005 London bombings, citing security concerns. The DRPA also closes the walkway after snowfall, or if the weather forecast includes a chance of snowfall, and closed it in late August 2011 during Hurricane Irene and in late October 2012 during Hurricane Sandy.

== See also ==
- List of crossings of the Delaware River
