= Haddonfield station =

Rapid transit station in New Jersey

Haddonfield
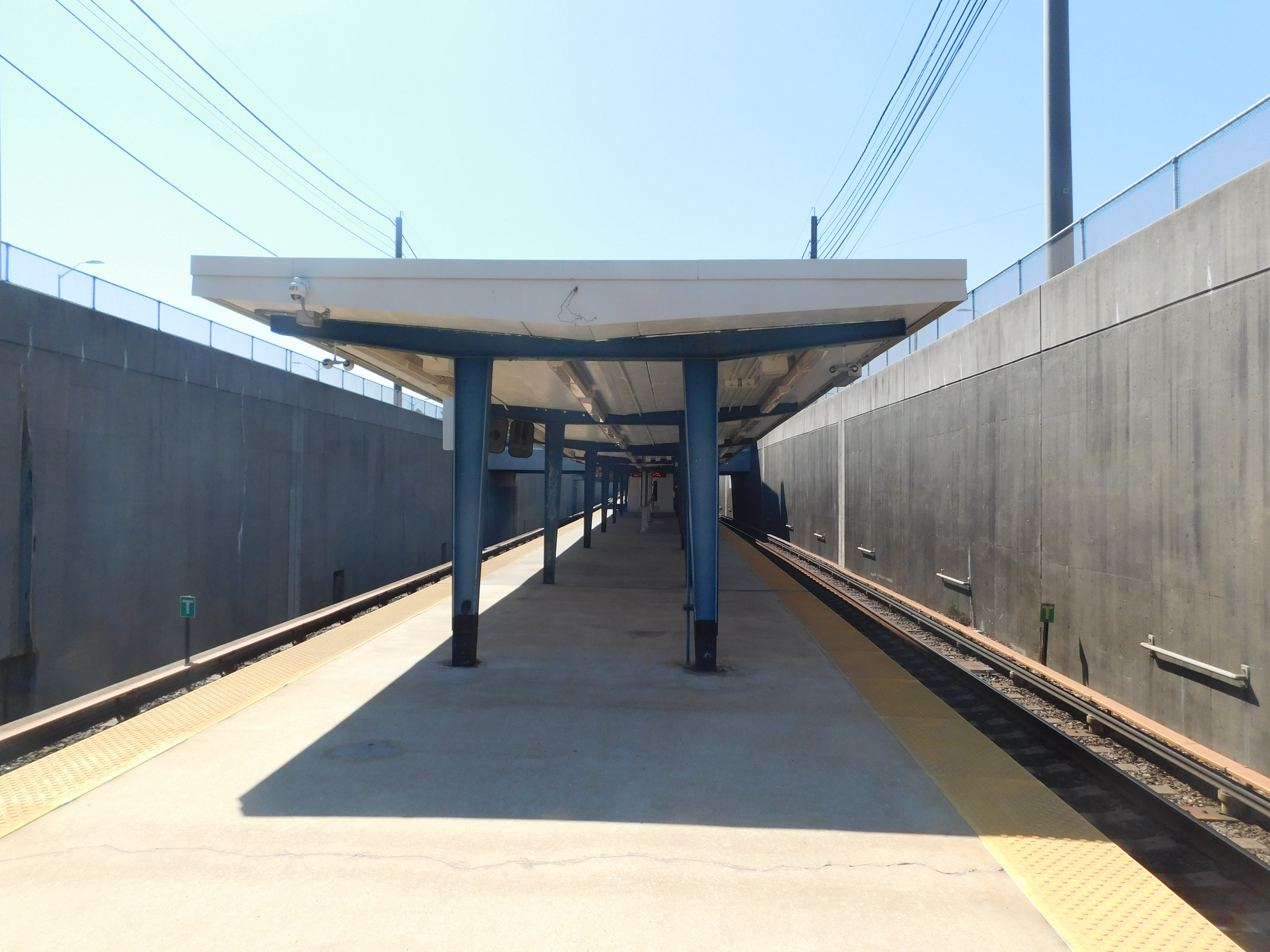
- PATCO platform at Haddonfield station in August 2022

General information
- Location: Westmont Avenue (west) and Rosedale Avenue (east); Haddonfield, New Jersey
- Coordinates: 39.89673°N 75.03632°W
- Owner: Delaware River Port Authority
- Platforms: 1 island platform
- Tracks: 2 (PATCO), 1 (Atlantic City Line)
- Connections: NJ Transit Bus: 451, 455, 457

Construction
- Parking: 1,021 spaces
- Cycle facilities: Racks
- Accessible: Yes

History
- Opened: January 4, 1969

Passengers
- 2025: 976 (average weekday)
- Rank: 9 of 14

Services
| Preceding station | DRPA | Following station |
|---|---|---|
| Westmont toward 15–16th & Locust | PATCO Speedline | Woodcrest toward Lindenwold |
Atlantic City Line does not stop here
Location

Haddonfield station is an active rapid transit station in the eponymous borough of Haddonfield, Camden County, New Jersey. Located on Westmont Avenue and Rosedale Avenue north of State Route 41 and County Route 573 (Kings Highway), the station serves trains of the PATCO Speedline, a rapid transit system operated by the Delaware River Port Authority from 15–16th & Locust station in Philadelphia, Pennsylvania to Lindenwold station in the namesake Lindenwold, New Jersey. Trains of New Jersey Transit's Atlantic City Line pass to the east of Haddonfield station but do not stop. Haddonfield station consists of a two-level design, with fare control at street level and the single island platform serving the two PATCO tracks under street level.

Railroad service in Haddonfield began with the opening of the Camden and Atlantic Railroad between the Cooper Point section of Camden and Haddonfield on August 22, 1853. Service reached Winslow Township in January 1854 and Absecon Island (modern-day Atlantic City) on July 1, 1854. The current station opened on January 4, 1969 as an extension of the PATCO Speedline from Broadway station in Camden to Lindenwold, resulting in service by the Pennsylvania-Reading Seashore Lines from Philadelphia to Lindenwold being abandoned on October 1, 1969.

== Station layout and services ==
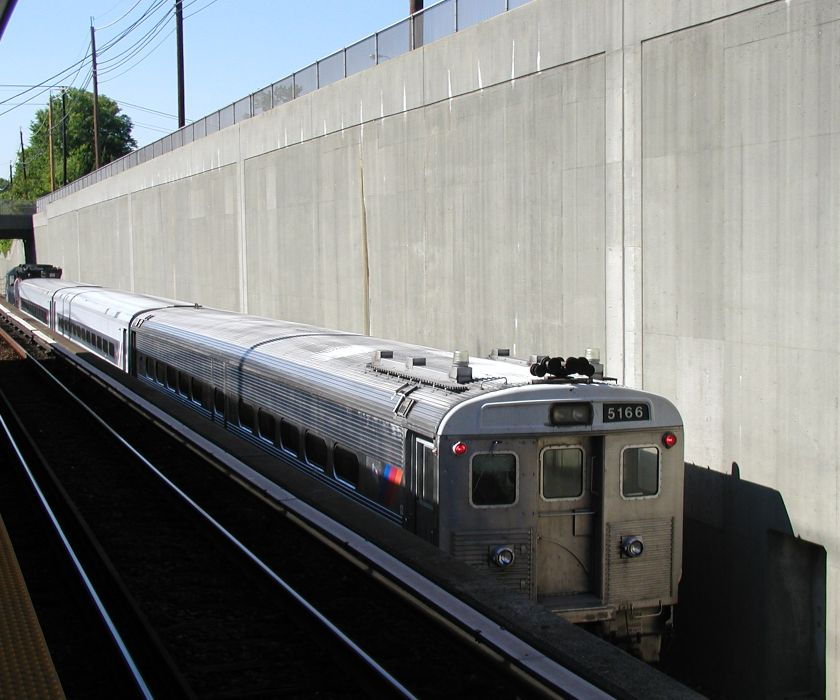
An Atlantic City Line train bypassing Haddonfield station in July 2008

Haddonfield is a two-level station, but unlike the rest of the line east of Camden, the station house is above the tracks, as the tracks are depressed through the municipality. The station house has entrances from Rosedale Avenue (east of the tracks) and Westmont Avenue (west). Haddonfield station consists of a single island platform between the two tracks. The station has six parking lots (three east of the tracks on Rosedale and three west of the tracks on Washington. Lot S3 on Washington Avenue is free of charge at all times. The rest are paid parking during the morning rush hour. PATCO services at the station runs between 15–16th & Locust station in Philadelphia, Pennsylvania and Lindenwold station in the namesake Lindenwold, New Jersey, where connection is available to the Atlantic City Line of New Jersey Transit. The Atlantic City Line runs east of the PATCO tracks, but does not stop at Haddonfield.

New Jersey Transit has three buses that stop at the station: the 451 (between Camden and Voorhees Town Center), 455 (from Paulsboro to Cherry Hill Mall), and 457 (From Camden to Moorestown Mall).

== History ==
=== Camden and Atlantic Railroad station (1852–1958) ===
The Camden and Atlantic Railroad was incorporated on March 19, 1852 to build a railroad from Camden to Absecon Island (modern-day Atlantic City), a sparsely inhabited island on the Atlantic Ocean to develop a place for an oceanside property alongside construction of iron furnaces and glass works. The survey, done by engineer Richard Osborne, occurred in May 1852 and was finished one June 18. The contract for construction was filed on September 1 and on September 14 they purchased a site at Coopers Point in Camden. They acquired land for a new terminal on Absecon Island in November 1852. On June 18, 1853, the railroad created a new ferry between Coopers Point and Vine Street in Philadelphia, Pennsylvania.

As part of Osborne's survey of the future Camden and Atlantic Railroad, he expected that 32,000 people would ride the train during the warmer months of the calendar year and 20,000 further would use the line to go to the beach at Absecon Island. He also made a special category to determine what revenues Haddonfield specifically would get the railroad, stating that passengers and freight combined would make the line about $5,000 (1852 USD) in revenue. Osborne's prediction on Haddonfield would become reality and the railroad would help develop the community.

The Camden and Atlantic Railroad opened service between Coopers Point in Camden and Haddonfield on August 22, 1853. The line opened new stations at Market Street in Camden, the Cooper Road, Collingswood and Cuthbert, along with Haddonfield. By that point, the railroad had begun extending the railroad to Longacoming, New Jersey. Three months later, on November 21, they extended the line on an official basis from Haddonfield to Longacoming. The line reached Winslow Township in January 1854 on extension from Haddonfield. On July 1, 1854, the line was opened to Absecon Island with an excursion train. Revenue service began the next day between Coopers Point and Absecon Island.

On March 2, 1855, the railroad announced that they would begin a local service between Camden, Haddonfield and Longacoming. The railroad approved building a station at Haddonfield, along with five other stops on April 6. Four days later, the railroad began running local trains between Coopers Point and Haddonfield.

The railroad agreed to build a new station at Haddonfield on request of locals in May 1867. In August 1878, the railroad decided to double-track the line between Camden and Haddonfield, a project that was finished in June 1880.

=== Proposed rapid transit line (1958–1963) ===
Mayor of Philadelphia Richardson Dilworth and Mayor of Camden George E. Brunner announced on May 22, 1958 that they were in support of a new high-speed rail line from 8th and Market Street station in Philadelphia to the Kirkwood station of the Pennsylvania-Reading Seashore Lines (PRSL) in Lindenwold, New Jersey. This new line would involve using tracks of the PRSL, extending service from Broadway station in Camden. The new $25 million line would build new stations and build new passenger cars, along with other necessary expenses. The new line would have 160 electrified trains operating at all stations, and eliminating grade crossings. A 1959 study noted that the new line would have 49,000 people use it per day between Haddonfield and Kirkwood, with trains operating between Philadelphia and Kirkwood every three minutes at peak hours.

Haddonfield
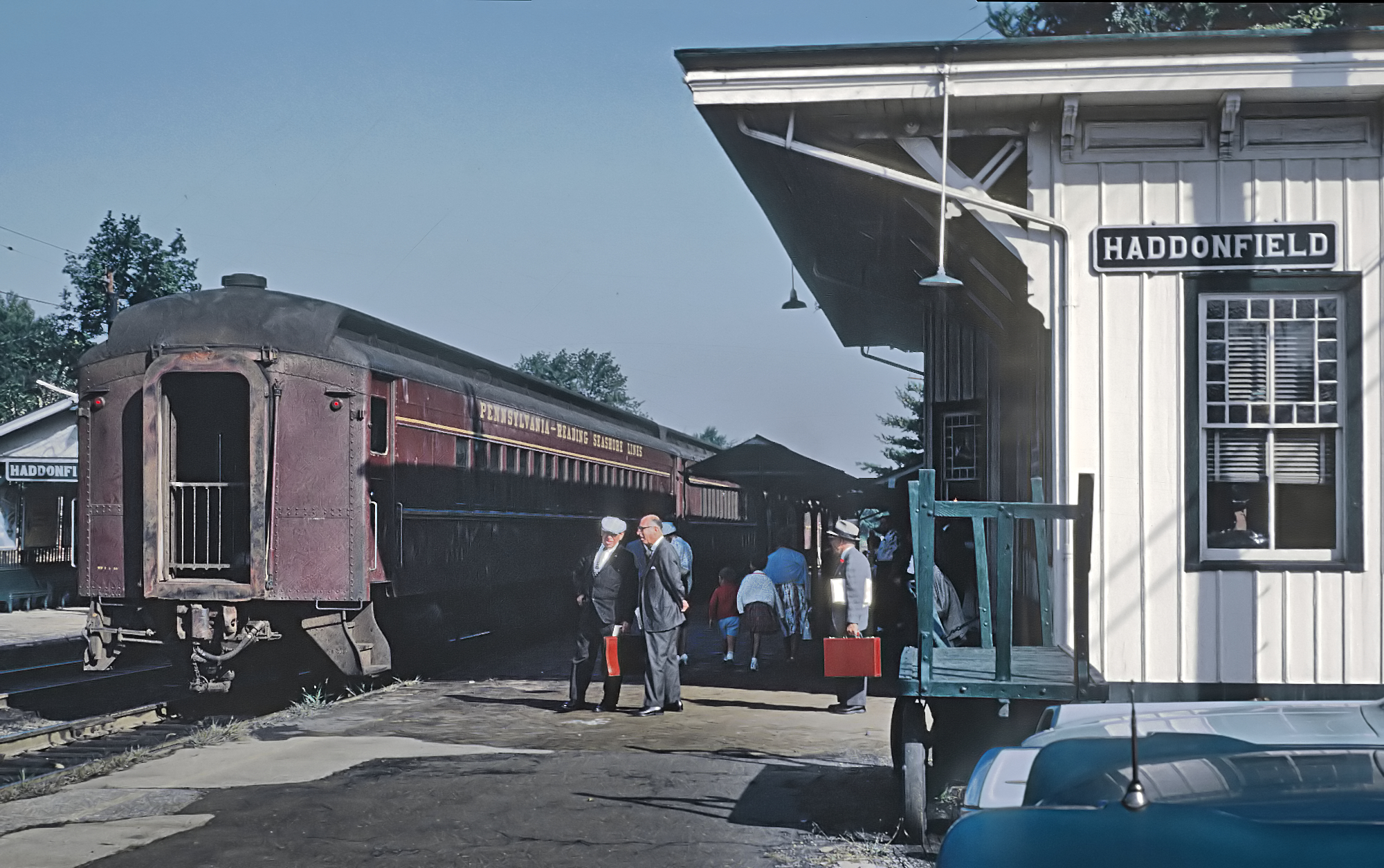
- Haddonfield station in September 1965 with a PRSL train in the station.

General information
- Location: Kings Highway (Route 41/County Route 573), Haddonfield, New Jersey
- Line: West Jersey and Seashore Railroad
- Platforms: 2 side platforms
- Tracks: 2

History
- Opened: August 22, 1853
- Closed: October 1, 1969

Former services
| Preceding station | Pennsylvania-Reading Seashore Lines | Following station |
|---|---|---|
| West Haddonfield toward Camden | WJ&S Main Line | Woodcrest toward Atlantic City |
| Terminus | WJ&S Medford Branch | Freeman toward Mount Holly |
Location

Haddonfield did their own study in 1959 and early 1960 that brought some questions for how the line through the municipality would be built. Simpson and Curtis, the firm that did the survey, noted public concerns about the project, including the fact that the station would be built on a large elevation through Haddonfield and that the new station would be built on the west side of Kings Highway (State Route 41/County Route 573). Haddonfield officials created a new committee to investigate the concerns and make their own recommendations. The committee would report on whether or not it would be better to elevate or depress the tracks through Haddonfield and working on the design of parking areas and other facilities to prevent congestion, protect pedestrian safety and ensure free movement for emergency vehicles.

John McCullough, the secretary for the Delaware River Port Authority (DRPA), noted that if Haddonfield wanted tracks depressed through the municipality that they would be unable to build the project, stating that other municipalities, such as Camden, Collingswood and Haddon Township would be on the telephone demanding depressed tracks. The committee, holding a meeting with DRPA executives on March 8, also requested that the station in Haddonfield be moved from the proposed location near Kings Highway to a location at the southern end of the municipality. Mayor Albert B. Sharp, noting unanimous preference for the depressed tracks, offered that if the difference was between depression and no construction, they would go with no construction. McCullough noted that depressing the tracks would result it in being a $100 million project instead of the current estimate of $44.6 million. Walter noted that the committee would prefer a smaller station closer to the proposed Interstate 295, where it would be more beneficial to multiple municipalities and reduce traffic congestion on Kings Highway. This would also offer the opportunity to eliminate a station in Ashland. McCullough added that any change in the station would need to involve the Pennsylvania Railroad, who owned and operated the tracks and that he would talk to the company about such a proposal.

The committee field its report on March 30, with a list of objections. Mayor Sharp also filed a letter to DRPA detailing the report. Sharp put pressure on the agency to make the changes they requested or their opposition would stand. 2,472 property owners filled out the questionnaire the committee sent out to 4,300 property owners, with only 205 wanting the DRPA proposal without any changes. 985 others were in favor of the project, but only if tracks through Haddonfield were depressed below street level. 1,270 people opposed the project and 13 showed no opinion on the project. Only one member of the Mayor's Committee supported the project without any changes, noting that the proposed line would have more benefits than disadvantages. However, the majority wanted the tracks from Woodland Avenue to Cottage Avenue depressed instead of elevated, stating that they felt the elevated structure would affect local property values. Commissioners of nearby Delaware Township (now known as Cherry Hill), through their support behind the committee, adding that the station in Haddonfield should be moved from Kings Highway to where the former Philadelphia, Marlton and Medford Railroad terminal stood.

With the PRSL threatening to shut down all lines in October 1960, discussion on what to do with the tracks in Haddonfield was sparked at a meeting of the Mayors Association between Sharp and Haddon Township Mayor William G. Rohrer. They passed a resolution pushing the New Jersey State Public Utility Commissioners (PUC) to prevent the PRSL from eliminating train service, noting that eliminating railroad service before the new high-speed line was built would be problematic for the future success of the line. Rohrer and Sharp both did not like the current version of the project proposed by DRPA, but that there was support for changes to the proposal.

Little progress was made through the end of 1960 and the $44.6 million project made its way to Trenton, New Jersey, where a hearing was held on July 5, 1961. Multiple speeches for and against the project were made in the presence of Governor Robert B. Meyner over using surplus funds to construct the line to Kirkwood. Paul McMurray from DRPA stated that an elevated approach was better than depression, arguing that the elevated structure would promote more parking for vehicles and not cost the extra $5.6 million it would cost for the depression project. DRPA offered $3.5 million in changes to the plan that would allow cross streets to cross under the tracks rather than be eliminated. It would also open more parking and design the wall to make it fit better in the neighborhood. DRPA added that putting the entire New Jersey side of the project under street level would make the project expensive and unfeasible. Camden, Haddon Township and Haddonfield officials all disagreed with DRPA on that, but added that other routes could be done through Camden, with a higher price tag. United States Representative William T. Cahill offered the federal government could help in the $5.6 million needed to depress the project.

Senator Harrison A. Williams Jr. (D–NJ) asked Meyner and Governor of Pennsylvania David L. Lawrence to not officially support the plan until a new bill with extra funding for the revenue-strapped railroads was passed that would get funds to depress the project below street level. Meyner and Lawrence had shown tepid support for the project up to July 1960, but supported that tracks should probably be depressed rather than elevated as DRPA proposed.

Meyner announced on January 10, 1962 that he would sign off on a revised plan from DRPA to accommodate officials from Camden, Haddonfield and Haddon Township on January 12. He said that Lawrence would sign the program as well, possibly on January 12 as well. DRPA's changes met the requests made by Meyner for his endorsement, making the project a total of $57.693 million. As part of the changes, the tracks of the PRSL and new line would be depressed from West Haddonfield to near Lincoln Avenue in Haddonfield and that all PRSL service would eventually be abandoned in favor of eliminating the single track operation. No changes would be made in Haddon Township, Westmont or Collingswood. McMurray added that the depressed tracks through Haddonfield would be 26–28 feet (7.9–8.5 m) deep, but with the depression project meant that more properties would need to be acquired for construction of the line. This included parking for 1,000 vehicles at a future Haddonfield station, compared to the elevation project, which would have reduced the impact. Sharp approved the changes and thanked DRPA for making changes. Meyner and Lawrence officially signed their project on January 12 and Meyner thanked his compatriot for holding until they worked on making changes to the project.

On April 23, 1963, plans for a renovation of 8th and Market Streets station were completed and approved by local officials and business executives. This would serve as the first project of the new line to New Jersey, with a new track installed on 8th Street for the Broad-Ridge Spur to prevent conflicts with the new line to Kirkwood.

=== Protests and construction (1963–1969) ===
Issues in Haddonfield began appearing in August 1963. At a heated borough commission meeting on August 13, residents criticized Sharp for comments he made about people being willing to sell properties for the construction of the new line to DRPA officials. He stated that residents on the east side of the tracks would be more willing to sell their properties for the construction more than the west side and added that most citizens would sell if a fair price was given. However, Sharp stated that he was making commentary on studies dating back to 1960, not in 1963. Several locals voiced their opposition to selling at all and Sharp added that he opposed the proposed 1,000 car parking lot and instead wanted DRPA to survey the area for the proper rate of parking.

In February 1964, Haddonfield officials also noted issues with the design work for the new station in Haddonfield. Haddonfield, which was a majority Colonial architecture municipality, felt that they wanted the station to match the community. The proposed DRPA structure would be a concrete structure of brutalist design, which went against the description of the station proposals in the project. The report noted that station buildings would be "functional and in harmony with their surroundings" and that it would "blend into the communities of which they are a part." Sharp added that the Port Authority gave him assurance that the new station would be of Colonial design and not of modern concrete designs, but that such an assurance held no legal stature. Sharp stated that the proposed design was opposed with vehement pressure and that he would look into changes as necessary. Robert Johnston, the Project Engineer, stated that the designs were preliminary and not final. Johnston and McMurray had given little interest if changes would be made to comply with Haddonfield's request and added that they had other things that concerned them.

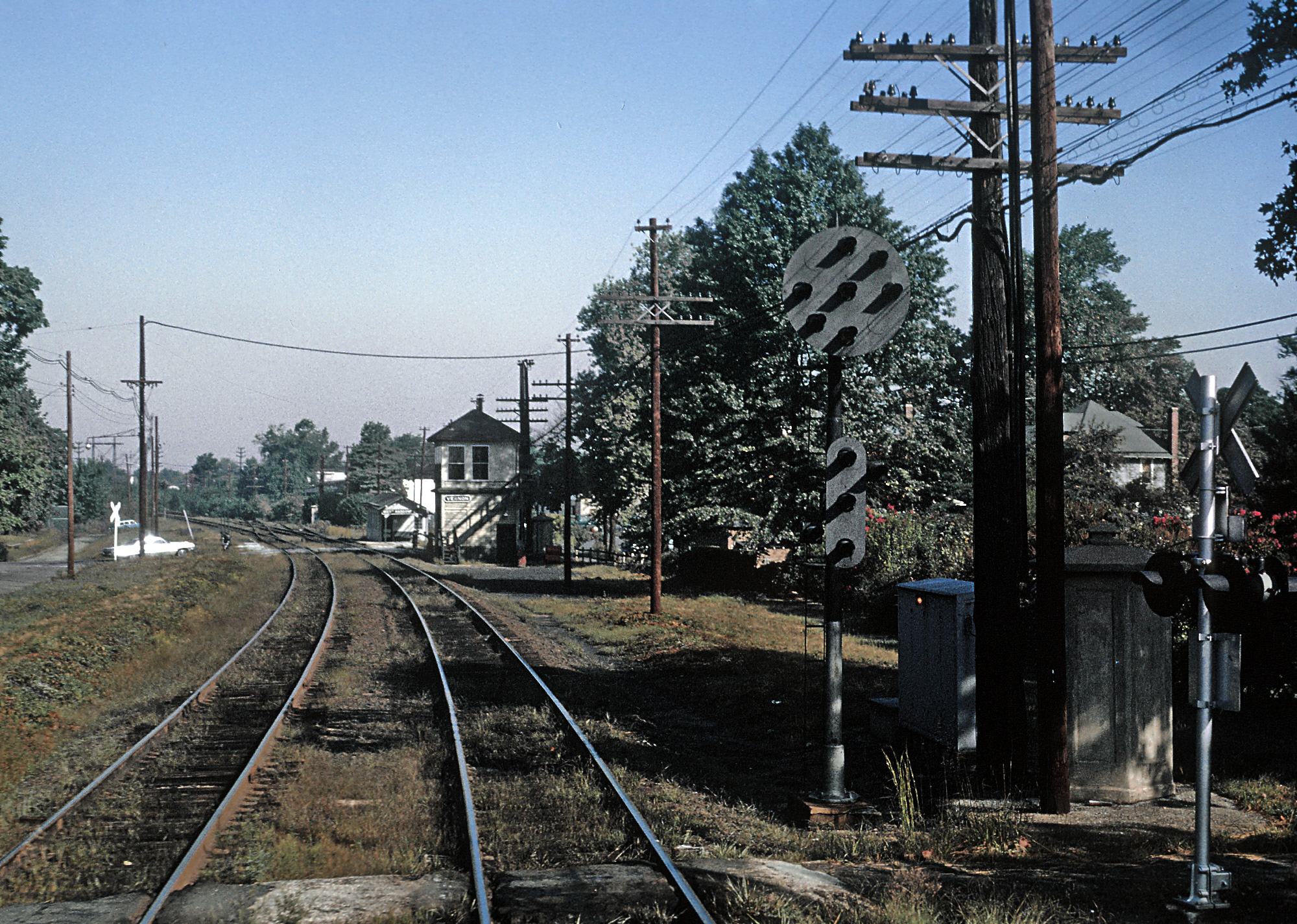
Vernon Tower and West Haddonfield station in September 1965, prior to construction of the new line

At a hearing on March 20, 1964, officials from the railroad transportation division of the New Jersey State Highway Department stated that they would expect service on the PRSL between Haddonfield and Camden to be curtailed to facilitate construction of the line to Kirkwood. In order to maintain some rail service for passengers on the lone remaining track, service to Philadelphia would remain, but all service would be eliminated by September 1964 to go to Camden. Rail service between Camden and Haddonfield would be replaced by express bus service and paid for by DRPA until the new commuter line was finished. With an expected downturn in ridership due to the elimination of Camden service, PRSL stated they would offer reduced fares to riders going from Haddonfield to Philadelphia to boost ridership and that the fare would be close to what Haddonfield–Camden was. The railroad division added that they would be alright with changes in services as necessary for construction and to continue state subsidies to the Pennsylvania Railroad and the PRSL based on car miles of approved services. With the new contract, the PRSL would be banned from discontinuing trains through the lifespan of the agreement.

Officials of DRPA and the Pennsylvania Railroad came to an official agreement on April 3, 1964 to purchase the right-of-way of the PRSL between Camden and Kirkwood. The right-of-way was purchased by DRPA from the railroad and several subsidiary holding companies for a total of $2.15 million and a $1.25 million check was given to the railroad by Frank M. Steinberg, the Pennsylvania-based chairman of the DRPA Board. J. Benton Jones and E. Paul Gangewere represented the Pennsylvania Railroad and the PRSL. The rest of the sale price would be paid during construction, with an opening expected between November 1967 and early 1968. DRPA would also pay the Pennsylvania Railroad an extra $4.058 million to cover expenses for the railroad widening Pavonia Yard in Camden. PRSL facilities would be moved to Pavonia Yard as part of construction and the railroad embankment between Broadway and the Delaware River would be eliminated.

With construction of the new line, the roadbed would be widened between Haddonfield and Kirkwood to install a third track and provide connection with the Delair Branch in West Haddonfield. After construction, service on the PRSL between Haddonfield and points east would remain for freight and passenger customers via Philadelphia. All freight service between Camden and Haddonfield would be replaced by trucks. The expectation was that construction of the new railroad bed would begin in the spring of 1966, replacing the existing tracks with new rails. As part of service, all PRSL right-of-way would be abandoned from Division Street in Camden to Vernon Tower in West Haddonfield.

The groundbreaking was held for the new $62 million line on June 11, 1964. The new Haddonfield station would have 921 spaces of parking between Kings Highway and Euclid Avenue. As part of future construction, DRPA announced in October that 24 properties along the line would be condemned for construction. Eight of these properties were in the area of Haddonfield station.

Dwight R. G. Palmer, the New Jersey Highway Commissioner, announced that a public hearing would be held on December 1 in Camden to outline plans for railroad passengers while the new line was under construction. Palmer added that DRPA planned to cut the tracks between Camden and Haddonfield in early January 1965 and that trains that continued to run through Camden would now run through Philadelphia instead. As part of doing so, the railroad would offer special buses at Haddonfield station for those going to Camden, but once construction began around July 1 at Haddonfield station, the transfer point would be moved to Haddon Township. The hearing at Camden City Hall became contentious when the unions that represented railroad staff protested the decision by the PRSL to eliminate service between Haddonfield and Camden. The legal counsel for the union noted that the abandonment of any railroad line is a decision made by the Interstate Commerce Commission (ICC) and not the State Highway Department. James Davis, the counsel for the union, requested the Interstate Commerce Commission postpone its hearing on February 4 and force DRPA to apply for permission to construct the new line in January 1965. The Interstate Commerce Commission announced that the petition would be denied.

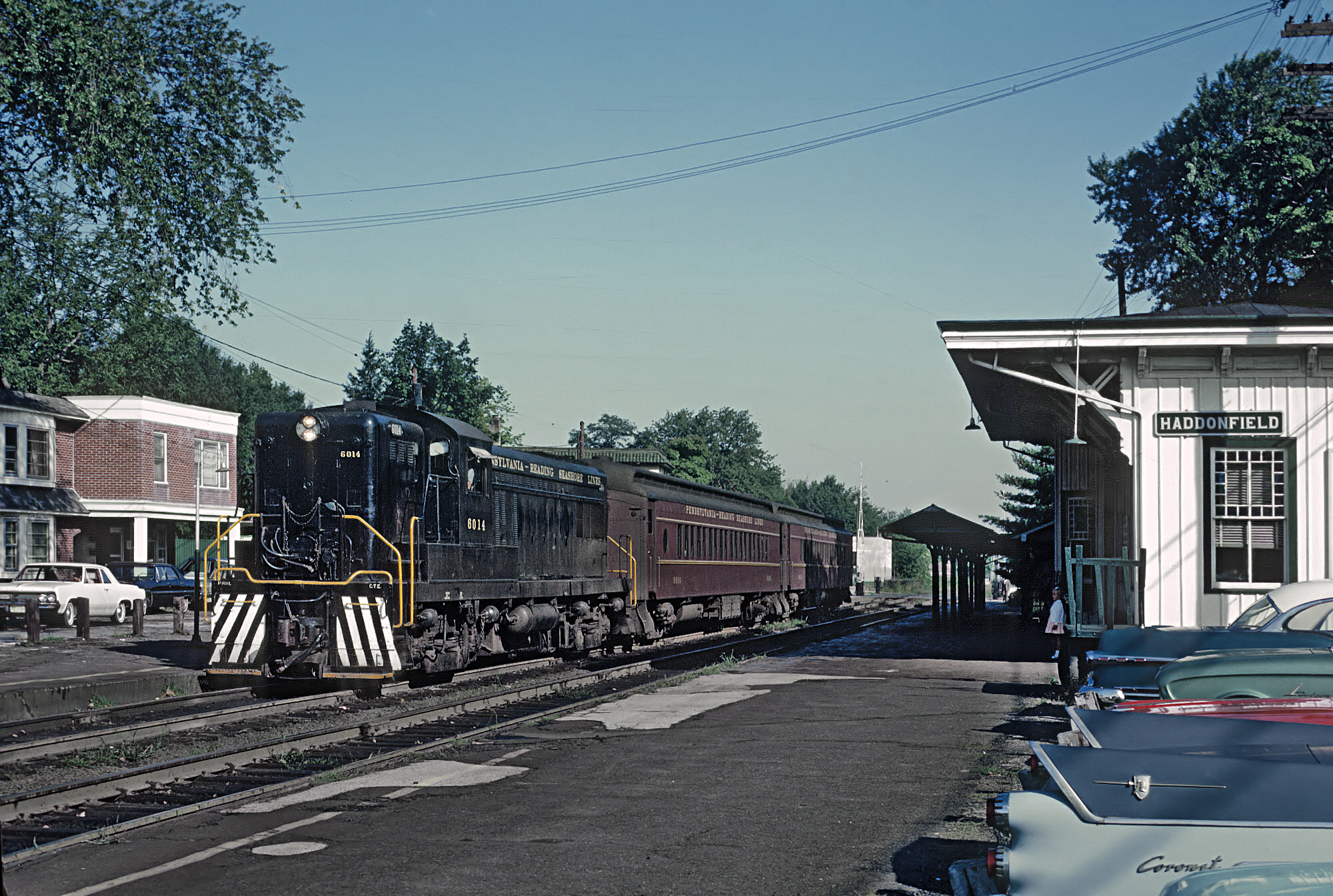
Haddonfield station in September 1965, a month prior to official approval of abandonment

Delays by the ICC led to delays in the beginning of construction, because no actions were expected until at least September 1965. By this point, only three local trains were operated between Ashland and Camden, making local stops. Public Service Coordinated Transport had gotten permission from all municipalities except for Haddonfield and Cherry Hill by March 1965. However, despite the delays from the Interstate Commerce Commission, no delays in completion were expected. DRPA noted that they were only doing preliminary work and right-of-way acquisition in the meantime. Also awaiting approval were contracts for $30 million that included construction of five new overpasses for the new line in Haddonfield: Kings Highway, Lincoln Avenue, Euclid Avenue, Mount Vernon Avenue and Redmond Avenue.

The Interstate Commerce Commission approved the abandonment of the tracks between West Haddonfield and Camden on October 5, 1965. McMurray noted that the completion date would be moved to the spring of 1968 due to the delays caused by the unions filing with the ICC. He added necessary bridges were already completed and that the railroad were ready to abandon the 4.2-mile (6.8 km) stretch of railroad. The PRSL got official permission from the ICC to abandon the service on November 23, 1965. The PRSL announced on December 28 that the changes would go into effect on January 17, 1966 with the abandonment of passenger service between Haddonfield and Camden starting that day. Bus service to Camden would replace passenger trains at all stations from Collingswood to Ashland. At Haddonfield, the bus stop would not be at the PRSL station on Kings Highway, but a block north at Euclid Avenue. The railroad also offered that all riders going to Camden would be offered the option to continue their rides to Philadelphia at a cheaper price.

The final trains between Camden and Haddonfield ran on January 14, 1966. Freights would be the only trains to continue making runs between the two municipalities on January 15 and January 16 before the tracks were to be torn up for construction of the new line. All trains from Atlantic City and Cape May were rerouted to Philadelphia and the PRSL was officially abandoned on January 16. The line between Vernon Tower at West Haddonfield and Kirk Tower in Kirkwood would become a single track. The new temporary station in Haddonfield opened on January 17 with the opening of the new bus service. Vernon interlocking and tower were officially decommissioned on January 24. Construction was underway by March 1966 with the tearing out of tracks reaching Haddonfield.

Construction of the new station began in 1967 with concrete coming from Trap Rock Industries' locations in Runnemede and Palmyra, New Jersey. The concrete would be for the new depressed track walls and for the wall that would separate the PRSL track from the new high-speed line facilities. On December 21, 1967, the PRSL opened its new single-track line between West Haddonfield and Kirkwood.

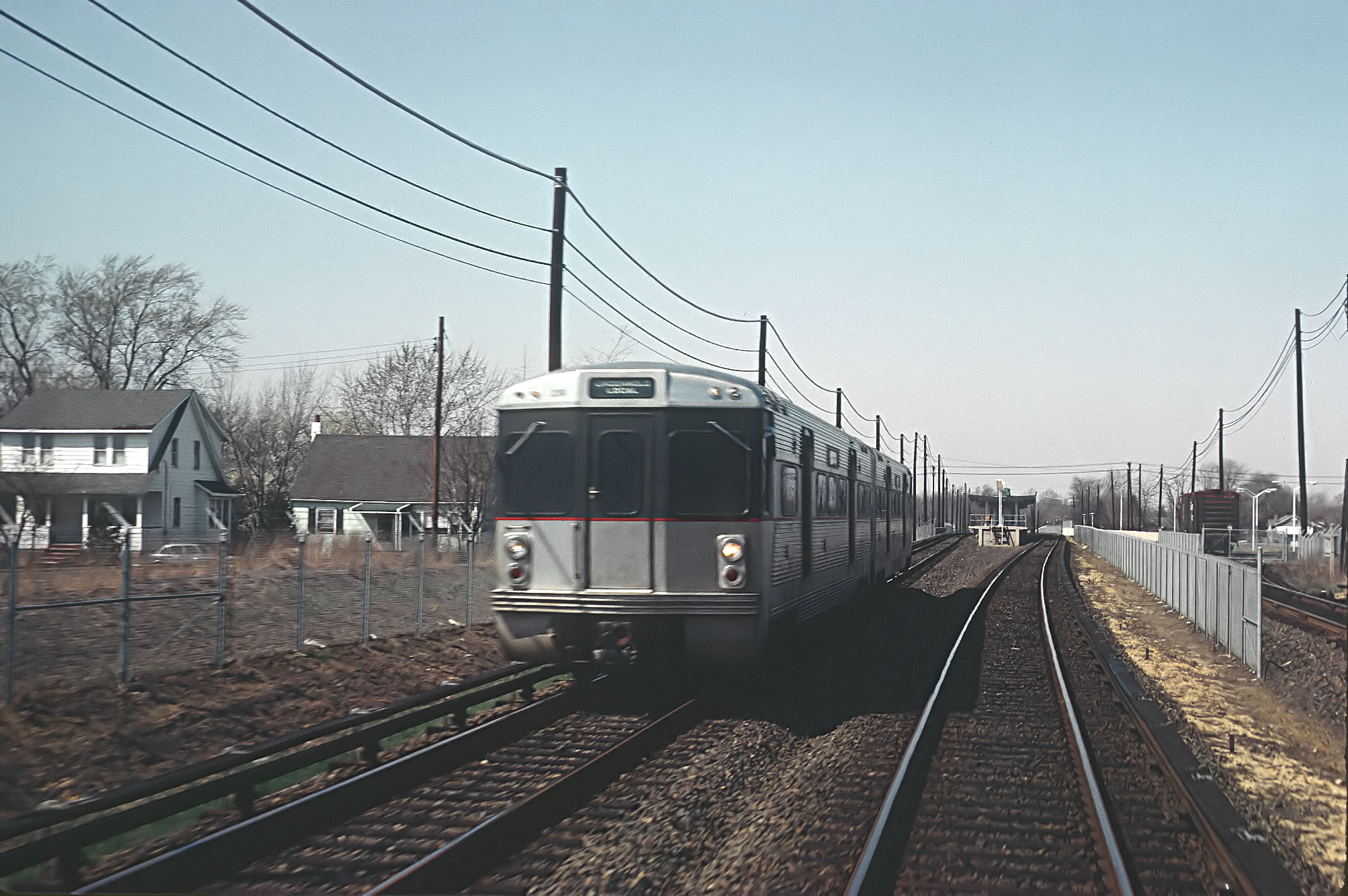
A Lindenwold-bound PATCO train leaving Haddonfield station in April 1969, two months after full service began to Philadelphia

Construction of the new line promoted development of business in Haddonfield, including those leaving Camden. Colony Mortgage Corporation moved in March 1968 to Haddonfield in a new building next to the new parking lot, excited about the new location and benefit of the railroad line. On September 30, the Better Business Bureau moved from Pennsauken to Haddonfield next to the new train station.

On December 6, 1968, the Mayor of Philadelphia James H. J. Tate and DRPA Chairman David M. Walker announced that service would begin on a temporary basis on January 4 and that full operation through Philadelphia would begin on February 1. Service between Philadelphia and Camden was temporarily suspended on December 29, 1968 to prepare for the opening of new service.

Service between Camden and Lindenwold began on January 4, 1969. On February 1, service to Philadelphia returned from Camden, terminating at 15–16th & Locust station and the first full run from Philadelphia to Lindenwold occurred on February 15. On September 21, 1969, the New Jersey Department of Transportation and PRSL announced that the station at Lindenwold would become the railroad link for all services, discontinuing PRSL service from Philadelphia after several hearings. All trains would terminate at Lindenwold beginning October 1.
