= William B. Brahms =

American historian and librarian

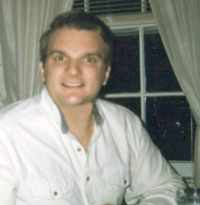
- Brahms in 2008
- Born: October 1, 1966 (age 60); Camden, New Jersey
- Occupations: Founder and president of Reference Desk Press, encyclopedist, reference book author, historian and librarian
- Website: William B. Brahms Profile

William Bernard Brahms (born October 1, 1966) is an American librarian, encyclopedist, author and historian best known for his encyclopedic works on historical "lasts" (as opposed to "firsts"), in particular, the reference works Notable Last Facts: A Compendium of Endings, Conclusions, Terminations and Final Events Throughout History (2005) and Last Words of Notable People: Final Words of More than 3500 Noteworthy People Throughout History (2010). "Last words" and "last facts" are subjects for which his works are cited as an authoritative resources.

== Life and work ==
Brahms was born in Camden, New Jersey, and was raised and still lives in Haddon Township, New Jersey, graduating in 1985 from Haddon Township High School. He graduated as a member of Phi Beta Kappa and Cap and Skull from Rutgers University-New Brunswick with a B.A. and from Rutgers Graduate School of Communication Information and Library Studies with an M.L.S. He has spent his entire career working in public libraries in New Jersey. Currently he manages and is Chief Librarian at the Camden County Library. He is also President of Reference Desk Press, Inc. and has published seven books, including the major library reference works Notable Last Facts which was selected as an "Achievement in Publishing" in Booklist's 2005 Editor's Choice issue and the Last Words of Notable People" which was profiled in Kirkus author Q & A in Kirkus Reviews and Reader's Digest Recommends" and cracked the Amazon.com Top 100 Best Seller list in 2011. Brahms has also written several books on regional history. In particular, his books on Franklin Township, Somerset County, New Jersey including: Franklin Township Somerset County, NJ: A History, and Images of America: Franklin Township. His book on the historic Westmont Theatre in Westmont, New Jersey is a tie-in to the film The Grand Old Lady directed by Brent J. Donaway; a film in which Brahms also appears. He is also co-author of another title in the national Image of America series, Images of America: Haddon Township. about Haddon Township, New Jersey.
