= Haddon Township High School =

High school in Camden County, New Jersey, US

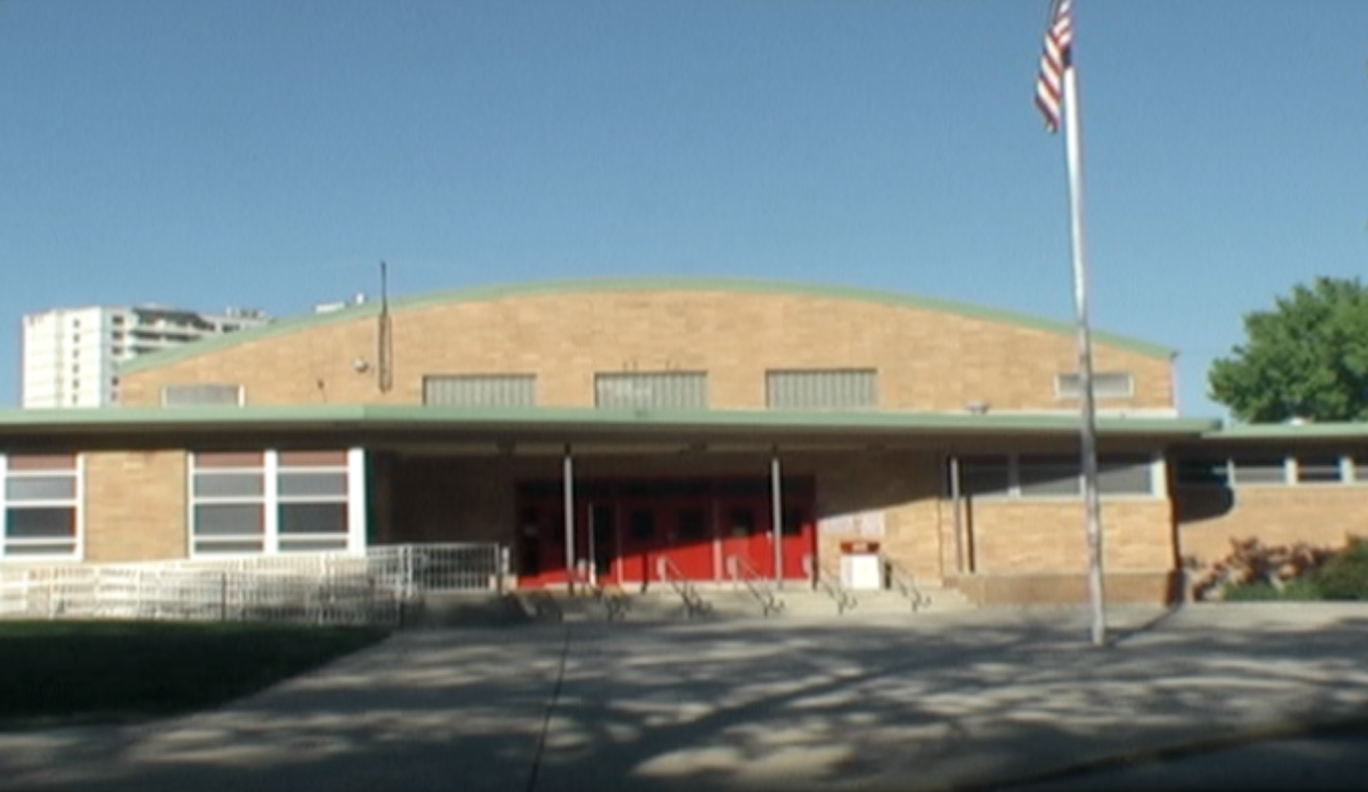

Location
- 406 Memorial Avenue; Westmont, Camden County, New Jersey 08108; United States; 39.904873°N 75.056383°W

Information
- Type: Public high school
- Established: September 1962
- School district: Haddon Township School District
- NCES School ID: 340636001540
- Principal: Kevin Greway
- Faculty: 47.8 FTEs
- Grades: 9-12
- Enrollment: 609 (as of 2024–25)
- Student to teacher ratio: 12.8:1
- Colors: Red and white
- Athletics conference: Colonial Conference (general); West Jersey Football League (football)
- Team name: Hawks
- Yearbook: The Anvil
- Website: hths.htsd.us

Haddon Township High School is a four-year comprehensive community public high school serving students in ninth through twelfth grades, located in Haddon Township, in Camden County, in the U.S. state of New Jersey, operating as the lone secondary school of the Haddon Township School District. The school offers courses in math, science, languages, humanities and various vocational skills. It also offers athletics and after-school clubs and organizations. The school follows a quarter-semester system, uses a 5-point GPA scale, and offers Advanced Placement and honors-level courses, both of which use a weighted average grading system.

As of the 2024–25 school year, the school had an enrollment of 609 students and 47.8 classroom teachers (on an FTE basis), for a student–teacher ratio of 12.8:1. There were 113 students (18.6% of enrollment) eligible for free lunch and 6 (1.0% of students) eligible for reduced-cost lunch.

== History ==
The name "Haddon Township High School" and the school colors of red and white were decided upon in December 1961, at which time plans were described under which the school would have a maximum capacity of almost 1,300 and would open in September 1962 with nearly 900 students in grades 7-10 while students in grades 11 and 12 continued their education at Collingswood High School. Designed as a two-story addition to the district's existing junior high school, the school was constructed at a cost of $1.75 million (equivalent to $18.6 million in 2025) and opened for the 1962-63 school year, with dedication ceremonies held in November 1962.

Prior to the establishment of Haddon Township High School in the 1960s, most Haddon Township students attended Collingswood High School, while some attended Haddonfield Memorial High School or Audubon High School.

== Awards, recognition and rankings ==
The school was the 108th-ranked public high school in New Jersey out of 339 schools statewide in New Jersey Monthly magazine's September 2014 cover story on the state's "Top Public High Schools", using a new ranking methodology. The school had been ranked 50th in the state of 328 schools in 2012, after being ranked 97th in 2010 out of 322 schools listed. The magazine ranked the school 80th in 2008 out of 316 schools. Previously, in 2006, the magazine ranked the school 77th out of 316 schools in New Jersey. Schooldigger.com ranked the school tied for 141st out of 381 public high schools statewide in its 2011 rankings (an increase of 11 positions from the 2010 ranking) which were based on the combined percentage of students classified as proficient or above proficient on the mathematics (85.0%) and language arts literacy (93.2%) components of the High School Proficiency Assessment (HSPA).

== Clubs and organizations ==
Clubs and organizations include Student Council, Bowling Club, Guitar Club, Math Club, Knowledge Bowl, Philosophy Club, Drama Club, Mock Trial, Environmental Club, Art Club, Athletic Training Club, Spanish Club, French Club, German Club, Latin Club, The Anvil (yearbook club), American Technological Honor Society, Future Business Leaders of America, Future Teachers of America, Jazz Band, Orchestra, Madrigal Show Choir, Chorus, National Honor Society, REBEL (an anti-smoking campaign), Students Against Destructive Decisions, National Language Honor Society, National Art Honor Society and the Fellowship of Christian Athletes.

== Athletics ==
The Haddon Township High School Hawks compete as a member of the Colonial Conference, which is comprised of public high schools in Camden and Gloucester counties, and operates under the auspices of the New Jersey State Interscholastic Athletic Association (NJSIAA). With 463 students in grades 10-12, the school was classified by the NJSIAA for the 2022–24 school years as Group II South for most athletic competition purposes. The football team competes in the Classic Division of the 94-team West Jersey Football League superconference and was classified by the NJSIAA as Group I South for football for 2024–2026, which included schools with 185 to 482 students.

- Fall sports
  - Cross country
  - Soccer
  - Field hockey
  - Girls' tennis
  - Football
  - Crew
- Winter sports
  - Swimming
  - Basketball
  - Wrestling
  - Indoor track and field
- Spring sports
  - Track and field
  - Boys' tennis
  - Softball
  - Baseball
  - Lacrosse

The boys' cross country team has won state championships in Group III in 1968, Group II in 1971, 1972, 1976, and 1986, and Group I in 1988, 2008, 2011, 2012, 2013, 2014, 2018 and 2019. Haddon Township's 13 state titles ranks fifth among all New Jersey high schools for number of boys' cross country state championships won. The team has won 22 South Jersey state sectional championships: Group III in 1968, Group II in 1970, 1971, 1972, 1975, 1976, 1985, 1986, and Group I in 1988, 1996, 2008, 2009, 2010, 2011, 2012, 2013, 2014, 2015, 2018, 2019, 2022, and 2023. The program ranks second all-time in number of South Jersey state sectional championships won.

The boys' track and field team has won three state championships: Group III in 1969* and Group II in 1971 and 1972. They have won nine South Jersey state sectional championships: Group III in 1969*, Group II in 1971 and 1972, and Group I in 1989, 1991, 2012, 2015, 2017 and 2019.

The softball team won the South I state championship in 1972 and won the Group II title in 1979, defeating Manchester Regional High School in the tournament final. The 1979 team finished the season with an 18-3 record after win the Group III title with a 2-0 win against runner-up Manchester Regional in the finals.

The baseball team won the 1979 Group III state title, defeating Verona High School by a score of 3-1 in the championship game played at Mercer County Park.

The boys' wrestling team won the South Jersey Group II state sectional championship in 1980 and 1987.

The field hockey team won the South Jersey Group I state sectional championships in 1988 and 1995.

The girls' basketball team won the Group I state championship in 1990, defeating North Warren Regional High School in the tournament final.

In 2000, the girls' soccer team was the Group I co-champion with New Providence High School.

The girls' cross country team won the Group I state championship in 2007. They have won 12 South Jersey state sectional championships: Group II in 1976, 1983, 1984, 2004, and Group I in 2000, 2007, 2008, 2011, 2014, 2016, 2020, and 2021. They are tied for 4th all-time in number of South Jersey state sectional championships won.

The boys soccer team won the Group I state championship in 2011 (defeating Waldwick High School in the finals), 2016 (as co-champion in 2016 with Verona High School) and 2022 (vs. Waldwick High School).

The girls' track and field team won the South Jersey Group I state sectional championship in 2016.

'*- No team title was officially awarded that year, but Haddon Township had the highest point total. The NJSIAA later recognized the team as the unofficial champions.

== Administration ==
The school's principal is Kevin Greway, whose administration team includes the assistant principal.

== Notable alumni ==
Notable alumni include:

- Mitch Albom (born 1958, class of 1976) is an American author, sports journalist, talk show host and philanthropist
- Laurie Beechman (1953–1998, class of 1971), Broadway actress and vocalist best known for her performances in Joseph and the Amazing Technicolor Dreamcoat, Cats and Les Misérables
- Tony Black (born 1951, class of 1970), record-holding jockey in North American Thoroughbred horse racing
- William B. Brahms (born 1966, class of 1985), librarian, encyclopedist, author and historian
- Gloria Casarez (1971–2014), civil rights leader and LGBT activist in Philadelphia
- Linda M. Springer (class of 1973), financial services executive who served as the eighth Director of the United States Office of Personnel Management
- Julianna White (born c. 1989, class of 2007), Miss New Jersey USA 2011
