= Elizabeth Haddon =

American colonist (1680–1762)

- Born: May 25, 1680; Southwark, London, England
- Died: March 30, 1762 (aged 81); Haddonfield, New Jersey, British America
- Burial place: Haddonfield Religious Society of Friends Cemetery; 39.8991°N 75.0329°W
- Movement: Religious Society of Friends
- Spouse: John Estaugh (m. 1702)
- Parents: John Haddon (father); Elizabeth Haddon (née Clarke) (mother)

Elizabeth Estaugh, née Haddon (May 25, 1680 – March 30, 1762) was an American pioneer. She was the founder of Haddon Township and Haddonfield, New Jersey.

== Early life ==
Elizabeth Haddon was born in Southwark, London, England, May 25, 1680. She was the third child of John Haddon, a blacksmith, and Elizabeth, née Clarke. Her father was a Quaker who faced religious persecution and was convinced by William Penn to move abroad. In 1702, he bought a 500-acre (2 km^{2}) tract of land in Gloucester County in the English colony of West Jersey. However, he was appointed as an officer of the Pennsylvania Land Company and the London Lead Company, so he did not leave England.

== Career ==
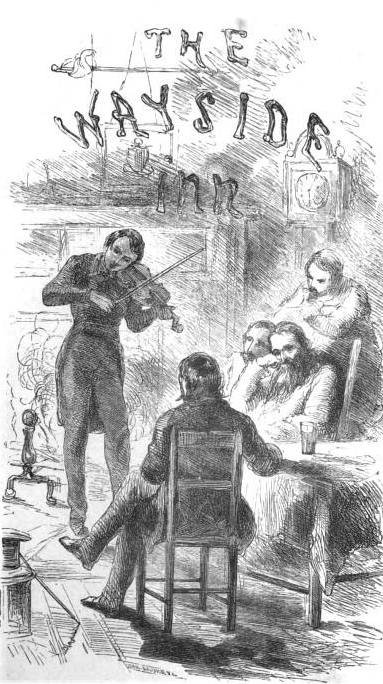
Title page illustration for an 1864 edition of Tales of a Wayside Inn

Haddon, a single woman, set sail from Southwark to the New World in 1701 without her family at the age of twenty or twenty-one. Her father had a house built for her at Cooper's Creek, Newtown Township. With the help of a widowed friend and two manservants, she developed the Haddonfield plantation.

She had met John Estaugh (1676–1742), a Quaker minister, at Bermondsey years before. Their courtship was described, fancifully, by Lydia Maria Child in The Youthful Emigrant. A True Story of the Early Settlement of New Jersey, first published on May 21, 1845, in the New-York Daily Tribune. Henry Wadsworth Longfellow drew on Child's account in writing Elizabeth, a poem in the third volume of his Tales of a Wayside Inn. They were married on the banks of the Cooper's Creek on December 1, 1702.

At first, the couple were engaged in establishing themselves and run the land owned by Elizabeth’s father. This would, however, change as time passed on. Haddon and John had no children, but they brought her sister's son, Ebenezer Hopkins, to America from Southwark when he was about five, and raised him as their son and heir. Ebenezer was the son of Benjamin and Sarah (Haddon) Hopkins, and the grandson of William and Katheryn Hopkins. Ebenezer was the progenitor of the Hopkins family of Haddonfield, New Jersey.

In 1713, John and Elizabeth built a three-story brick mansion called New Haddonfield Plantation, where Haddon managed the family property and her husband tended to his missionary journeys; the Brew House she built in 1713 still stands in the backyard. Although the first recorded commercial female brewer in the Colonies was Mary Lisle, who inherited her father's Philadelphia brewpub in 1734, there is reason to believe that across the river in South Jersey, Haddon was running a more-than-average homebrew operation.

She and her husband were active in the Quaker community. She was very close with Elizabeth Woolman, the sister of John Woolman. Elizabeth died at her Haddonfield home at the age of 82 on March 30, 1762. She was buried in an unmarked grave in the Burial Ground of the Haddonfield Monthly Meeting of the Religious Society of Friends (Quakers).
