= Mary Roebling =

Mary G. Roebling
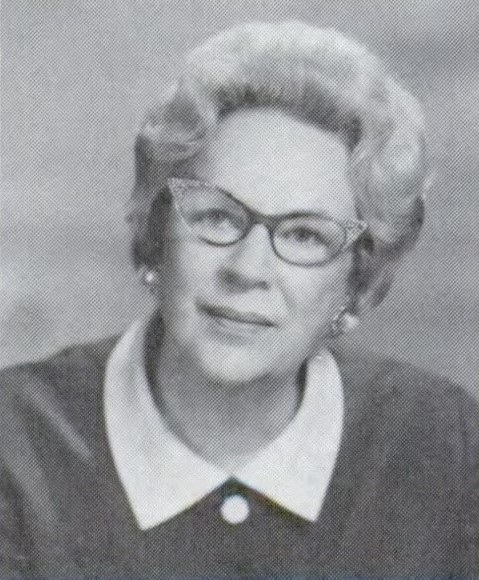
- Mary Roebling circa 1970
- Born: July 29, 1905; West Collingswood, New Jersey
- Died: October 25, 1994 (aged 89); Trenton, New Jersey
- Occupation: Banker
- Known for: First woman to head a major U.S. bank.

Mary Gindhart Herbert Roebling (July 29, 1905 – October 25, 1994) was an American banker, businesswoman, and philanthropist. She was the first woman to serve as president of a major US bank.

== Biography ==
Mary Gindhart was born in West Collingswood, New Jersey on July 29, 1905. Mary's parents were Isaac Dare Gindhart Jr. and Mary (Simon) Gindhart, and was the eldest of four children. Mary's father Isaac was the president of the Keystone & Eastern Telephone Company, and her mother was a singer and pianist. She attended public schools in Moorestown and Haddonfield. She married musician Arthur Herbert in her teens (15), in 1920, and had a daughter, Elizabeth, in 1921 . Arthur died in 1922. She then worked in Philadelphia at an investment house while taking night classes in business administration and merchandising at the University of Pennsylvania. Her second husband, was Hugh Graham. They married in 1923. She divorced Graham and married Siegfried Roebling in 1932 (a son of John A. Roebling II. Siegfried died in 1936 and left her Trenton Trust stock. She took his seat on a Trenton Trust Company board. She was elected president of the board on January 21, 1937, and became the first woman to serve as president of a major American commercial bank. She served as either president or chair of the board until 1972 when the bank merged with National State. She then chaired the combined banks until 1984.

Over the years Mary was requested to serve in various public service capacities including Citizen's Advisory Committee on Armed Forces Installations, Atlantic Congress for NATO, White House Congress on Refugee Programs, International Chamber of Commerce's 17th Congress, and Citizens Advisory Council to the Committee on the Status of Women. Through several administrations, Roebling served as a civilian aide to the Secretary of the Army. She was made president of the new Army War College Foundation in 1978. That year she also founded Women's Bank N.A. in Denver, the nation's first chartered bank established by women, and chaired its board until 1983. From 1958 to 1962, she was governor of the American Stock Exchange. She was their first woman governor.

In a 1965 speech, Mrs. Roebling said: "As a woman who for years has competed in the business world, I would be the first to agree that the American woman has almost unbelievable economic power, but American women, like women of all civilized nations, do not use the influence their economic power gives them."

In 1983, Roebling became the first female member of the Union League of Philadelphia.

She died on October 25, 1994, of renal failure at her home in Trenton, NJ.

== Awards and recognition ==
- In 1973, Roebling received the Golden Plate Award of the American Academy of Achievement.
- In 2019, Roebling was inducted into the New Jersey Hall of Fame.
