= Haddon Township School District =

School district in Camden County, New Jersey, US

Address
- 500 Rhoads Avenue Haddon Township, Camden County, New Jersey, 08108; United States
- Coordinates: 39.901648°N 75.054348°W

District information
- Grades: PreK to 12
- Superintendent: Robert J. Fisicaro
- Business administrator: Jennifer Gauld
- Schools: 7

Students and staff
- Enrollment: 2,100 (as of 2024–25)
- Faculty: 160.0 FTEs
- Student–teacher ratio: 13.1:1

Other information
- District Factor Group: FG
- Website: www.haddontwpschools.com
Ind.	Per pupil	District spending	Rank (*)	K-12 average	%± vs. average
1A	Total Spending	$15,685	8	$18,891	−17.0%
1	Budgetary Cost	13,686	33	14,783	−7.4%
2	Classroom Instruction	7,778	21	8,763	−11.2%
6	Support Services	2,014	30	2,392	−15.8%
8	Administrative Cost	1,709	54	1,485	15.1%
10	Operations & Maintenance	1,732	44	1,783	−2.9%
13	Extracurricular Activities	380	32	268	41.8%
16	Median Teacher Salary	60,949	22	64,043
Data from NJDoE 2014 Taxpayers' Guide to Education Spending. *Of K-12 districts with 1,800-3,500 students. Lowest spending=1; Highest=68

The Haddon Township School District is a comprehensive community public school district that serves students in pre-kindergarten through twelfth grade from Haddon Township, in Camden County, in the U.S. state of New Jersey.

As of the 2024–25 school year, the district, comprised of seven schools, had an enrollment of 2,100 students and 160.0 classroom teachers (on an FTE basis), for a student–teacher ratio of 13.1:1.

== History ==
The district is classified by the New Jersey Department of Education as being in District Factor Group "FG", the fourth-highest of eight groupings. District Factor Groups organize districts statewide to allow comparison by common socioeconomic characteristics of the local districts. From lowest socioeconomic status to highest, the categories are A, B, CD, DE, FG, GH, I and J.

A lobbying effort by students at Strawbridge Elementary school led John A. Rocco and Thomas J. Shusted to introduce a bill to name the hadrosaurus foulkii as the official state dinosaur; the legislation was signed into law by Governor James Florio with students from the school in attendance at the signing ceremony.

== Schools ==
Schools in the district (with 2024–25 enrollment data from the National Center for Education Statistics) are:

Elementary schools

- Thomas A. Edison Elementary School with 159 students in grades PreK–5
  - Caroline Lunsford, principal
- Clyde S. Jennings Elementary School with 123 students in grades K–5
  - Lori Massey, principal
- Stoy Elementary School with 174 students in grades PreK–5
  - Lori Massey, principal
- Strawbridge Elementary School with 244 students in grades K–5
  - Caroline Lunsford, principal
- Van Sciver Elementary School with 345 students in grades PreK–5
  - Don Pullano, principal

Middle school

- William G. Rohrer Middle School with 414 students in grades 6–8
  - Andrew Swiecicki, principal

High school

- Haddon Township High School with 609 students in grades 9–12
  - Kevin Greway, principal

== Administration ==
Core members of the district's administration are:

- Robert J. Fisicaro, superintendent
- Jennifer Gauld, business administrator / board secretary

== Board of education ==
The district's board of education, comprised of nine members, sets policy and oversees the fiscal and educational operation of the district through its administration. As a Type II school district, the board's trustees are elected directly by voters to serve three-year terms of office on a staggered basis, with three seats up for election each year held (since 2012) as part of the November general election. The board appoints a superintendent to oversee the district's day-to-day operations and a business administrator to supervise the business functions of the district.
