= Don McComb =

American football player (1934–2018)

No. 85
- Position: Defensive end

Personal information
- Born: March 24, 1934; Camden, New Jersey, U.S.
- Died: June 3, 2018 (aged 84); Haddon Township, New Jersey, U.S.
- Listed height: 6 ft 4 in (1.93 m)
- Listed weight: 240 lb (109 kg)

Career information
- High school: Camden Catholic
- College: Villanova (1952–1955)
- NFL draft: 1956: 21st round, 249th overall pick

Career history
- Boston Patriots (1960)
- Stats at Pro Football Reference

Donald H. McComb (March 24, 1934 – June 3, 2018) was an American professional football player who played with the Boston Patriots. He played college football at Villanova University.

He died on June 3, 2018, in his home in Haddon Township, New Jersey.
