= Notable Last Facts =

Notable Last Facts: A Compendium of Endings, Conclusions, Terminations and Final Events Throughout History
- Author: William B. Brahms
- Language: English
- Genre: Nonfiction
- Publisher: Reference Desk Press
- Publication date: 2005
- Media type: Print
- Pages: 848
- ISBN: 0-9765325-0-6

Notable Last Facts is a book published by the American librarian/writer William B. Brahms in 2004 and was the first relatively comprehensive collection of important lasts.

== Summary ==
Although that work mainly details American culture (TV, radio, sports are almost completely American examples), and to a lesser extent with European culture (in art, music and transportation for example), some sections (Nations, Wars, Slavery, Voting, and Era & Empires for example) do have a broad international treatment. The smaller trivia books on "lasts" by Christopher Slee (cited below) have a treatment that is almost exclusively limited to the United Kingdom. Examples of "Notable Last Facts" include the last surviving participant or witness to a historic event, the last work produced by a major artist, author, performer or musician, or perhaps the last remaining example of a once-prevalent style or object, such as a type of architecture, or a make or model of an automobile, motorcycle, or airplane. Notable lasts are often used a finite demarcations of social, artistic and historical eras or periods.
