= Newton Union Schoolhouse =

- U.S. National Register of Historic Places
- New Jersey Register of Historic Places
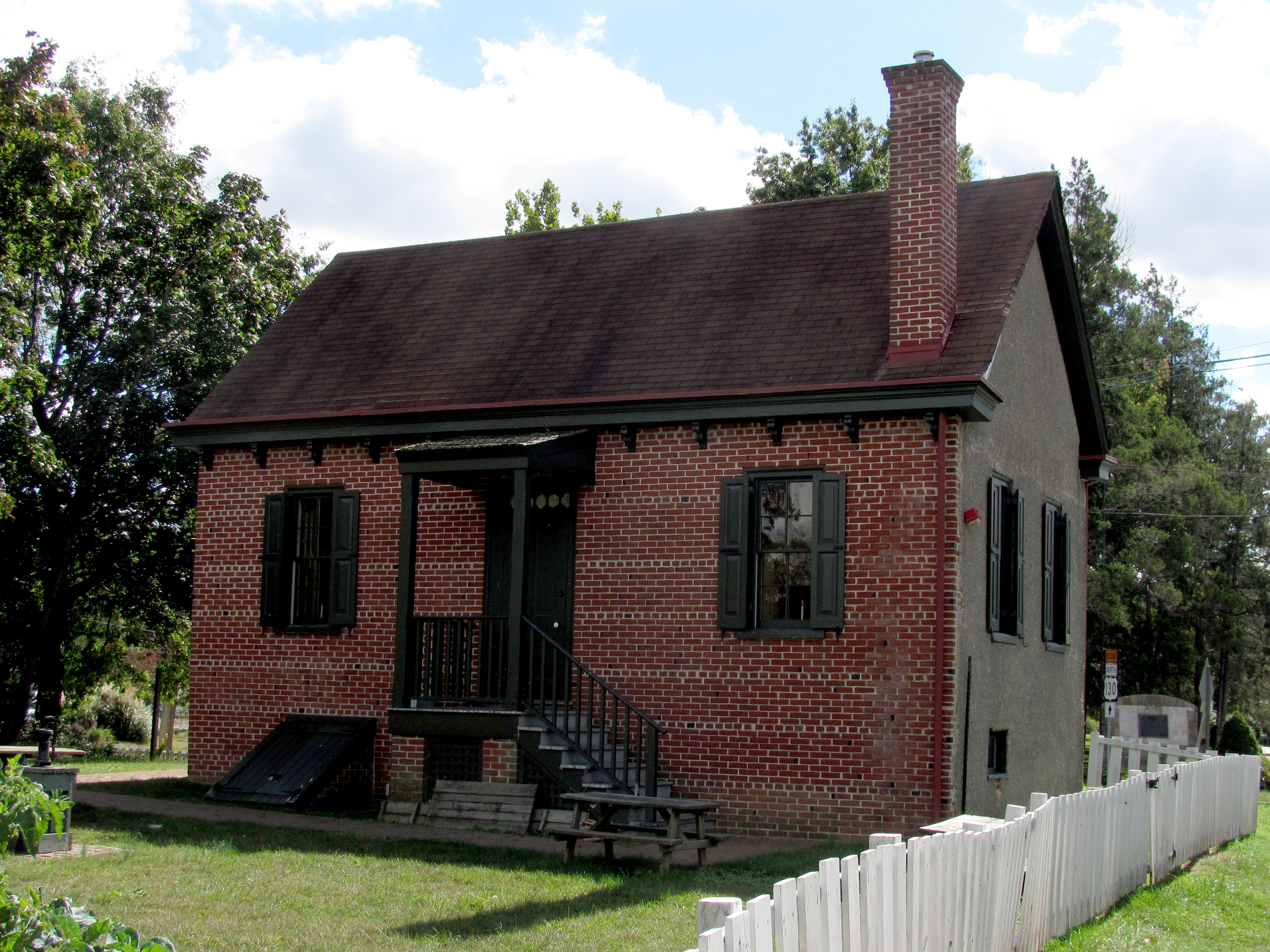
- Newton Union Schoolhouse

- Location within Camden County, New Jersey Location within New Jersey Location within the United States
- Location: Collings and Lynne Avenues, Haddon Township, New Jersey
- Coordinates: 39°54′31″N 75°5′30″W
- Area: 0.7 acres (0.28 ha)
- Built: 1821
- Built by: Newton Union School Society
- Architectural style: One-room schoolhouse
- NRHP reference No.: 88002122
- NJRHP No.: 969

Significant dates
- Added to NRHP: October 27, 1988
- Designated NJRHP: October 3, 1980

The Newton Union Schoolhouse, also known as Champion School, in Haddon Township, Camden County, New Jersey, United States, was a one-room schoolhouse that was built in 1821. It was listed on the National Register of Historic Places in 1988.
