= Westmont station (PATCO) =

Rapid transit statio in New Jersey

Westmont
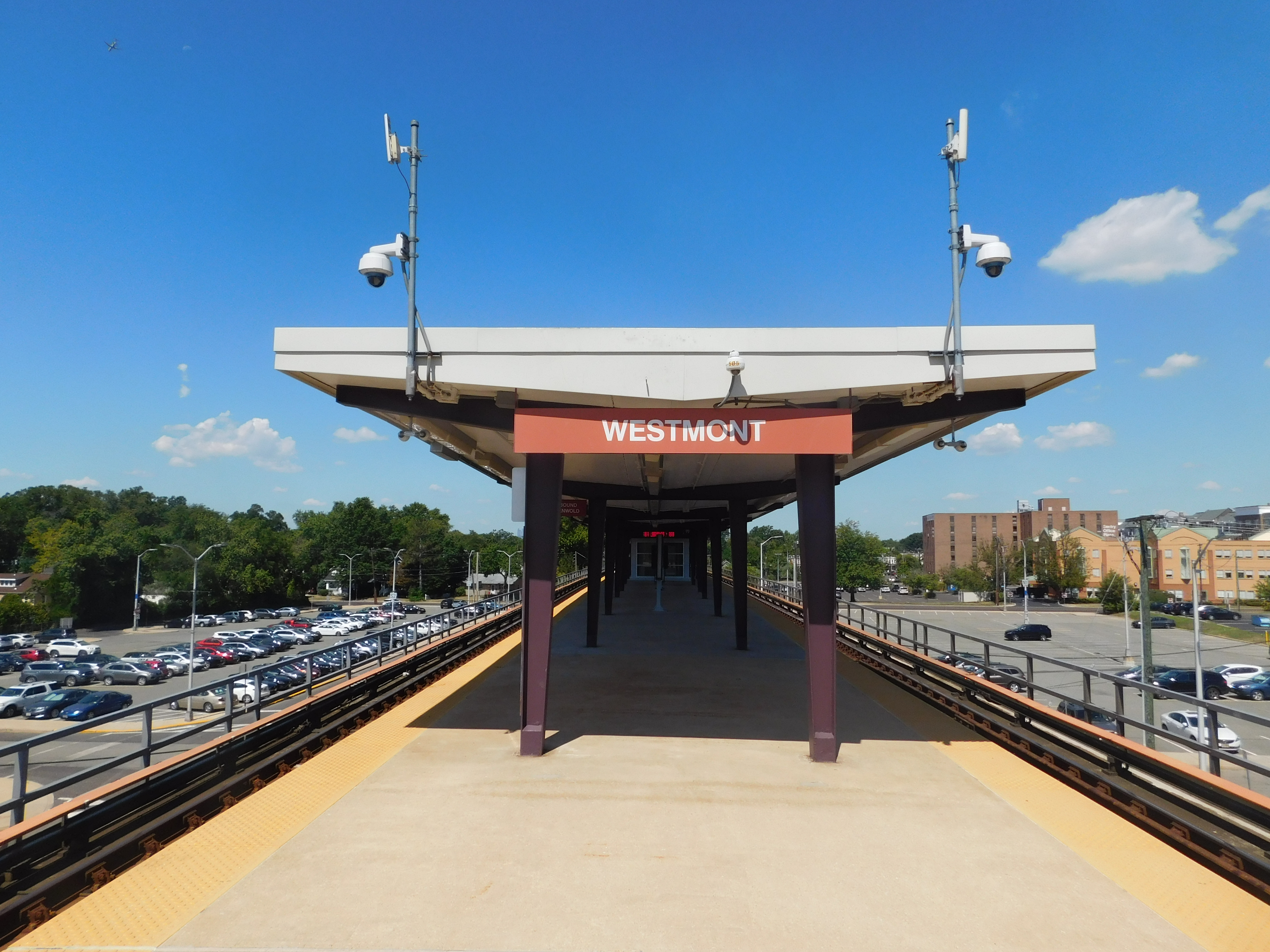
- Platform at Westmont PATCO station in August 2022

General information
- Location: 100 Stoy Avenue; Haddon Township, New Jersey
- Coordinates: 39.9071°N 75.0468°W
- Owner: Delaware River Port Authority
- Platforms: 1 island platform
- Tracks: 2
- Connections: NJ Transit Bus: 450, 451

Construction
- Parking: 1,149 spaces
- Cycle facilities: Racks
- Accessible: Yes

History
- Opened: January 4, 1969

Passengers
- 2025: 893 (average weekday)
- Rank: 11 of 14

Services
Preceding station	DRPA	Following station
Collingswood toward 15–16th & Locust	PATCO Speedline	Haddonfield toward Lindenwold
Location

Westmont station is an elevated station on the PATCO Speedline in the Westmont section of Haddon Township, New Jersey, United States. The station contains both metered and free parking and racks for up to 32 bicycles. Westmont station was built in a manner similar to that of nearby Collingswood station, with a single island platform. East of the station, the line descends from an elevated structure to an open cut. It is grouped with the Collingswood and Haddonfield stations in pricing from Philadelphia.
