= John Estaugh =

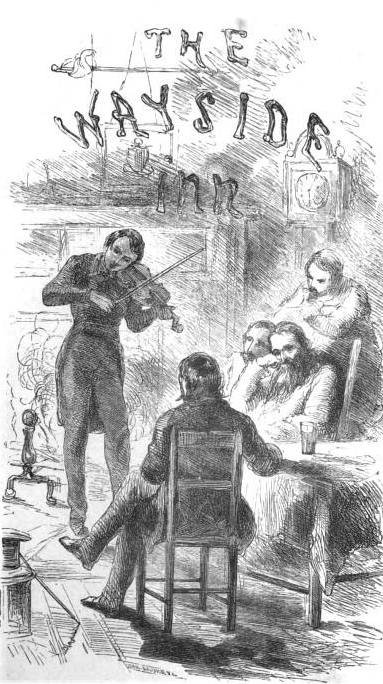
Title page illustration for an 1864 edition of Tales of a Wayside Inn

John Estaugh (1676—1742) was an American Quaker minister in colonial New Jersey.

== Biography ==
John Estaugh was born in Kelvedon, England on April 23, 1676. He was a minister who first met Elizabeth Haddon in England. He came to America to preach and later settled in Haddonfield, New Jersey.

Haddon met up with John and proposed to him and they were married in 1702. Their love story is immortalized in the work of Henry Wadsworth Longfellow's Tales of a Wayside Inn.

== Later years ==
John went on a religious trip to Tortola in the West Indies in 1742. He died from a fever on December 6, and was buried there in a brick tomb.
