= Haddon Township, New Jersey =

Township in Camden County, New Jersey, US

- Township
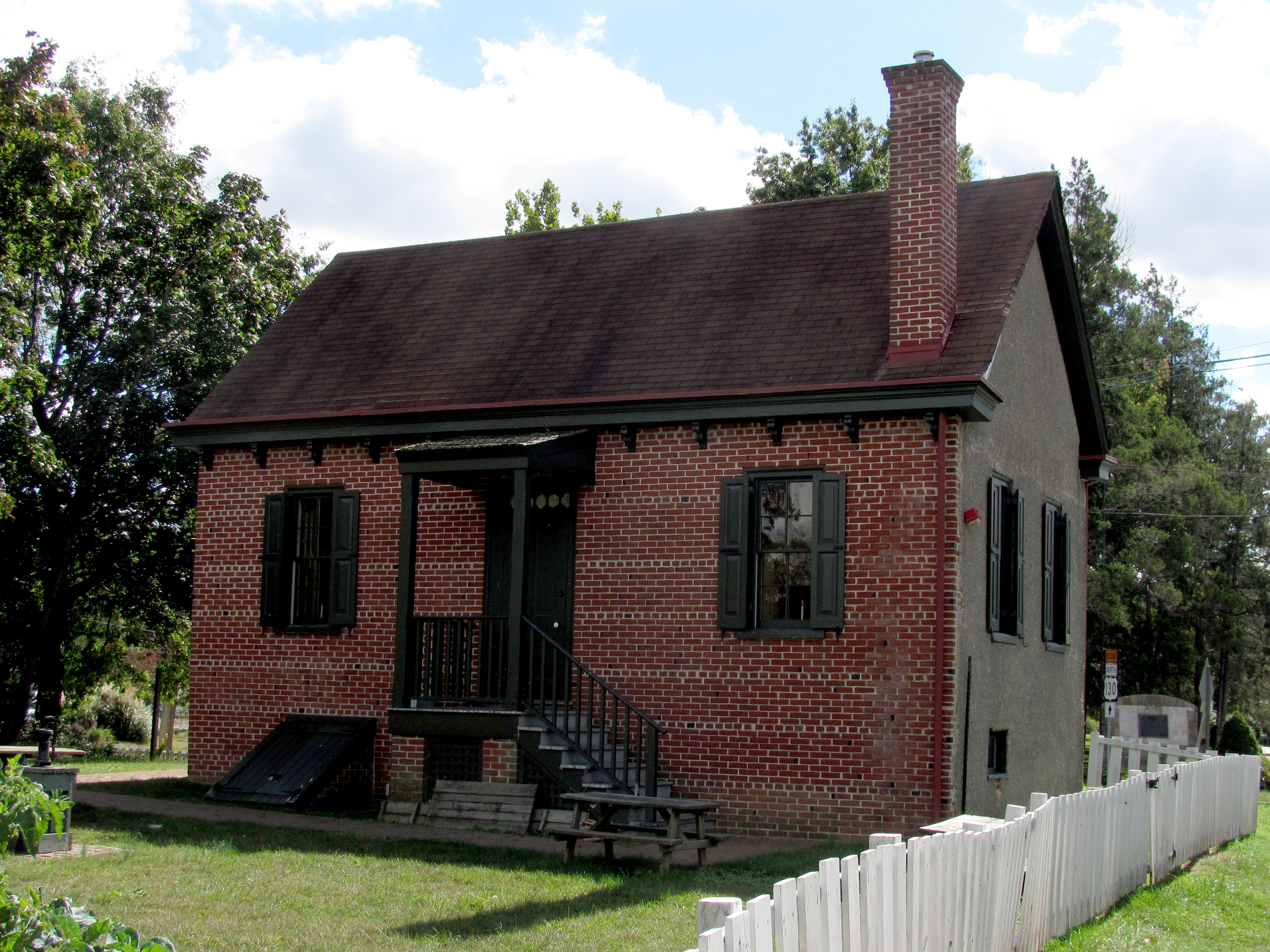
- Newton Union Schoolhouse

- coat of arms
- Motto: Where community thrives
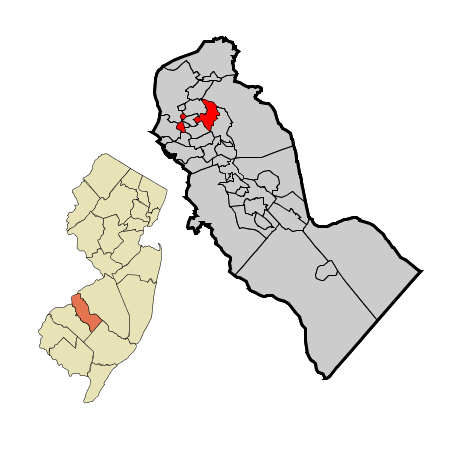
- Haddon Township highlighted in Camden County. Inset: Location of Camden County in New Jersey.

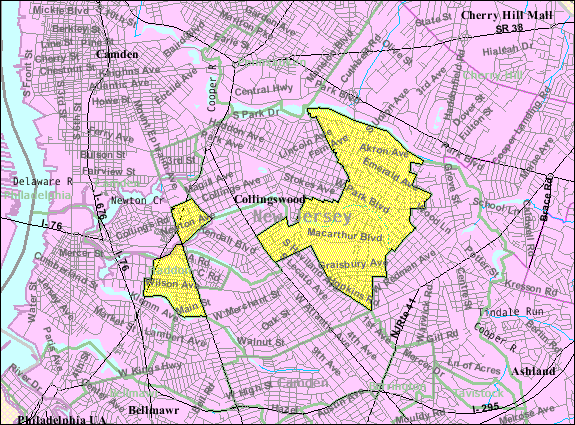
- Census Bureau map of Haddon Township, New Jersey

- Location in Camden County Location in New Jersey Location in the United States
- Coordinates: 39.906°N 75.063°W
- Country: United States
- State: New Jersey
- County: Camden
- Earliest European settlement: 1681
- Incorporated: February 23, 1865
- Named for: Elizabeth Haddon

Government
  - Type: Walsh Act
  - Body: Board of Commissioners
  - Mayor: Randall W. "Randy" Teague (term ends May 11, 2027)
  - Municipal clerk: Dawn M. Pennock

Area
  - Total: 2.82 sq mi (7.30 km^{2})
  - Land: 2.69 sq mi (6.97 km^{2})
  - Water: 0.13 sq mi (0.33 km^{2}) 4.54%
  - Rank: 352nd of 565 in state 14th of 37 in county
- Elevation: 20 ft (6.1 m)

Population (2020)
  - Total: 15,407
  - Estimate (2023): 15,461
  - Rank: 170th of 565 in state 8th of 37 in county
  - Density: 5,723.3/sq mi (2,209.8/km^{2})
  - Rank: 97th of 565 in state 8th of 37 in county
- Time zone: UTC−05:00 (Eastern (EST))
  - Summer (DST): UTC−04:00 (Eastern (EDT))
- ZIP Codes: 08104, 08107, 08108, 08033, 08059, 08030
- Area code: 856
- FIPS code: 3400728740
- GNIS feature ID: 0882156
- Website: www.haddontwp.com

Haddon Township is a township in Camden County, in the U.S. state of New Jersey. As of the 2020 United States census, the township's population was 15,407, an increase of 700 (+4.8%) from the 2010 census count of 14,707, which in turn reflected an increase of 56 (+0.4%) from the 14,651 counted in the 2000 census.

Under the terms of an act of the New Jersey Legislature on February 23, 1865, Haddon Township was incorporated from portions of Newton Township. The following communities were subsequently created from the Haddon Township: Haddonfield (April 6, 1875), Collingswood (May 22, 1888), Woodlynne (March 19, 1901), Haddon Heights (March 2, 1904), Audubon (March 13, 1905) and Oaklyn (also March 13, 1905). The township was named for early settler Elizabeth Haddon.

Haddon Township allows the sale of alcohol, and has several bars and restaurants which serve alcoholic beverages, unlike the neighboring boroughs of Collingswood, Haddonfield and Haddon Heights which prohibit the sale of alcohol.

== History ==
The township's first European settlers settled in the area of Newton Creek in 1681. In 1701, Elizabeth Haddon Estaugh, the daughter of John Haddon, arrived in the American colonies to oversee his large landholdings, which included areas that are now Collingswood, Haddon Township, and Haddonfield. Contemporary Newton Township included land that later became part of Audubon, Audubon Park, Camden, Collingswood, Gloucester City, Haddon Heights, Haddonfield, Oaklyn, and Woodlynne.

=== Saddlertown ===
In the late 1830s, a runaway slave, who had taken the surname Saddler to avoid detection by his former master, came to New Jersey from a Maryland plantation with his wife and two daughters. Saddler worked for Cy Evans, a local Quaker farmer, from whom he bought five acres to farm. The area where Saddler settled became a predominantly black community known as Saddlertown, a stop on the Underground Railroad. Today, Saddlertown is racially diverse.

== Geography ==
According to the United States Census Bureau, Haddon Township had a total area of 2.82 square miles (7.30 km^{2}), including 2.69 square miles (6.97 km^{2}) of land and 0.13 square miles (0.33 km^{2}) of water (4.54%).

Haddon Township has two exclaves, West Collingswood Heights and West Collingswood Extension. The downtown portion of the township is known as Westmont, a name probably derived from a noted harness racing horse. Other unincorporated communities, localities and place names located partially or completely within the township include Crystal Lake, Cuthbert and Oakdale.

Haddon Township borders the Camden County municipalities of Audubon, Audubon Park, Camden, Cherry Hill (water border), Collingswood, Gloucester City, Haddonfield, Mount Ephraim, and Oaklyn.

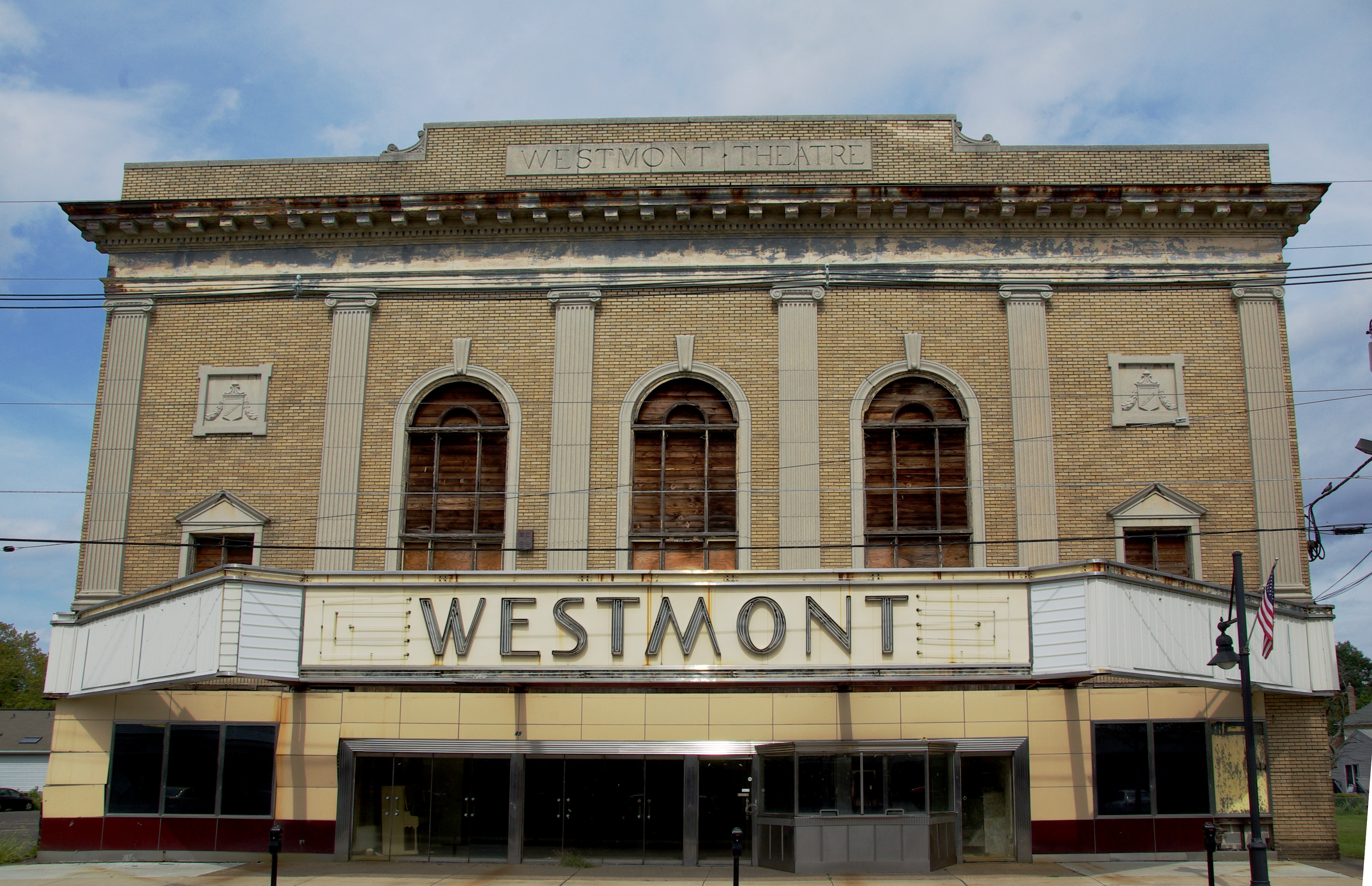
Westmont Theater, now a gym, is located on Haddon Avenue.

== Demographics ==
Historical population
Census	Pop.	Note	%±
1870	1,926		—
1880	1,071	*	−44.4%
1890	888	*	−17.1%
1900	2,012		126.6%
1910	1,465	*	−27.2%
1920	2,708		84.8%
1930	9,198		239.7%
1940	9,708		5.5%
1950	12,379		27.5%
1960	17,099		38.1%
1970	18,192		6.4%
1980	15,875		−12.7%
1990	14,837		−6.5%
2000	14,651		−1.3%
2010	14,707		0.4%
2020	15,407		4.8%
2023 (est.)	15,461		0.4%
Population sources: 1870–2000; 1870–1920 1870 1880–1890; 1890–1910 1910–1930; 1940–2000 2000; 2010 2020 * = Lost territory in previous decade.

=== 2020 Census ===
Based on 2020 Census data, Haddon Township has a population of approximately 15,407, characterized by a predominantly White population (86%) with a median age of 41.2 years. The median household income is $115,298. The community is mostly suburban, with a 5.9% poverty rate and roughly 6,989 households.

=== 2010 census ===
The 2010 United States census counted 14,707 people, 6,226 households, and 3,860 families in the township. The population density was 5,472.6 per square mile (2,113.0/km^{2}). There were 6,477 housing units at an average density of 2,410.1 per square mile (930.5/km^{2}). The racial makeup was 93.16% (13,701) White, 1.50% (220) Black or African American, 0.16% (23) Native American, 2.71% (398) Asian, 0.01% (2) Pacific Islander, 1.11% (163) from other races, and 1.36% (200) from two or more races. Hispanic or Latino of any race were 3.95% (581) of the population.

Of the 6,226 households, 26.7% had children under the age of 18; 48.5% were married couples living together; 10.0% had a female householder with no husband present and 38.0% were non-families. Of all households, 32.3% were made up of individuals and 15.0% had someone living alone who was 65 years of age or older. The average household size was 2.36 and the average family size was 3.04.

21.7% of the population were under the age of 18, 7.1% from 18 to 24, 25.7% from 25 to 44, 28.3% from 45 to 64, and 17.2% who were 65 years of age or older. The median age was 41.8 years. For every 100 females, the population had 93.0 males. For every 100 females ages 18 and older there were 89.3 males.

The Census Bureau's 2006–2010 American Community Survey showed that (in 2010 inflation-adjusted dollars) median household income was $70,392 (with a margin of error of +/− $6,948) and the median family income was $90,156 (+/− $6,251). Males had a median income of $60,221 (+/− $5,315) versus $52,179 (+/− $4,167) for females. The per capita income for the borough was $35,506 (+/− $2,687). About 3.6% of families and 6.2% of the population were below the poverty line, including 2.4% of those under age 18 and 9.9% of those age 65 or over.

=== 2000 census ===
As of the 2000 United States census, there were 14,651 people, 6,207 households, and 3,891 families residing in the township. The population density was 5,443.4 inhabitants per square mile (2,101.7/km^{2}). There were 6,423 housing units at an average density of 2,386.4 per square mile (921.4/km^{2}). The racial makeup of the township was 95.42% White, 1.18% African American, 0.05% Native American, 2.01% Asian, 0.04% Pacific Islander, 0.56% from other races, and 0.74% from two or more races. Hispanic or Latino of any race were 1.54% of the population.

There were 6,207 households, out of which 27.5% had children under the age of 18 living with them, 49.9% were married couples living together, 9.9% had a female householder with no husband present, and 37.3% were non-families. 33.0% of all households were made up of individuals, and 17.5% had someone living alone who was 65 years of age or older. The average household size was 2.36 and the average family size was 3.05.

In the township, the population was spread out, with 22.6% under the age of 18, 5.8% from 18 to 24, 28.7% from 25 to 44, 22.9% from 45 to 64, and 20.0% who were 65 years of age or older. The median age was 41 years. For every 100 females, there were 88.4 males. For every 100 females age 18 and over, there were 83.4 males.

The median income for a household in the township was $51,076, and the median income for a family was $65,269. Males had a median income of $44,943 versus $32,967 for females. The per capita income for the township was $25,610. About 1.6% of families and 4.1% of the population were below the poverty line, including 2.3% of those under age 18 and 5.2% of those age 65 or over.

== Government ==
=== Local government ===
Since 1950, Haddon Township has been governed under the Walsh Act with a governing body comprised of a three-member commission. The Township is one of 30 municipalities (of the 564) statewide governed under the commission form of government. Commission members are elected at-large on a non-partisan basis as part of the May municipal election to serve four-year concurrent terms of office. At a reorganization meeting held after the election, each commissioner is assigned responsibility for supervising a specific department. The commissioners select one of their members to serve as a part-time mayor, who presides over meetings but has no independent executive function. Haddon Township has had only three mayors in its history: William Rohrer, William J. Park. Jr., (1997 New Jersey State League of Municipalities Mayors Hall of Fame), and Randall Teague.

As of 2023, members of the Haddon Township Commission are Mayor Randall W. "Randy" Teague (Commissioner of Public Works, Parks and Public Property), Ryan Linhart (Commissioner of Revenue and Finance) and Jim Mulroy (Commissioner of Public Affairs and Public Safety); all serving terms of office that end May 16, 2027. Linhart, Mulroy and Teague ran unopposed in the May 2023 municipal election, the fourth consecutive time that township candidates won election to four-year terms, without facing any challengers.

In November 2018, Ryan Linhart was appointed to fill the seat vacated by Paul Dougherty, who resigned the previous month before he pleaded guilty to a criminal charge.

Jim Mulroy was sworn into office in February 2017 to fill the seat vacated by John Foley, who resigned from office earlier that month.

==== Police, fire, and emergency services ====
Haddon Township has three fire districts (a fourth, District 2, was dissolved in 2016), each governed by five elected fire commissioners. Fire District 1 is the Westmont and Bluebird section, protected by the Westmont Fire Company No. 1, which was established in 1902. The former Fire District 2 covered the West Collingswood Extension section. Since being dissolved, Haddon Township now contracts directly with the Borough of Collingswood Fire Department (Station 16–1) for fire protection in the Extension section. Fire District 3 is the Bettlewood, Heather Glen, Heather House and Heather Woods sections and it contracts with the Westmont Fire Company No. 1 for fire protection from District 1. Fire District 4 is the West Collingswood Heights section, protected by the West Collingswood Heights Fire Co., Westmont Fire Co. (Station 15–1) and West Collingswood Heights Fire Co. (Station 15–2) are both Haddon Township companies, but separate entities with their own chiefs.

Ambulance service throughout the Township is also divided, mirroring the fire service.

The Westmont Fire Company No. 1 provides both fire and EMS services. Daniel F. Devitt has served as Chief since 2021.

Police coverage throughout the entire township is provided by the Haddon Township Police Department, which also provides services for Audubon Park. The department was established in 1926. As of 2017, it consists of 26 sworn officers.

=== Federal, state and county representation ===
Haddon Township is located in the 1st Congressional District and is part of New Jersey's 6th state legislative district.

For the 119th United States Congress, New Jersey's 1st congressional district is represented by Donald Norcross (D, Camden). New Jersey is represented in the United States Senate by Democrats Cory Booker (Newark, term ends 2027) and Andy Kim (Moorestown, term ends 2031).

For the 2026–2027 session, the 6th legislative district of the New Jersey Legislature is represented in the State Senate by James Beach (D, Voorhees Township) and in the General Assembly by Louis Greenwald (D, Voorhees Township) and Melinda Kane (D, Cherry Hill).

Camden County is governed by a Board of County Commissioners composed of seven members chosen at-large in partisan elections for three-year terms on a staggered basis by the residents of the county, with either two or three seats up for election each year as part of the November general election. At a reorganization meeting held in January after each election, the newly constituted Board of Commissioners selects one member to serve as Director and another as Deputy Director, each serving a one-year term in that role. As of 2025, Camden County's Commissioners are: Commissioner Director Louis Cappelli Jr. (D, Collingswood, 2026), Commissioner Deputy Director Edward T. McDonnell (D, Pennsauken Township, 2025), Virginia Ruiz Betteridge (D, Runnemede, 2025), Almar Dyer (D, Pennsauken Township, 2027), Melinda Kane (D, Cherry Hill, 2027), Jeffrey L. Nash (D, Winslow Township, 2027), and Jonathan L. Young Sr. (D, Berlin Township, 2026).

Camden County's constitutional officers are: Clerk Pamela Rosen Lampitt (D, Cherry Hill, 2029) Sheriff Chuck Billingham (D, Gloucester City, 2027) and Surrogate Michelle Gentek-Mayer (D, Gloucester Township, 2025).

Haddon Township does not have a dedicated postal ZIP Code, sharing the codes of Collingswood, Haddonfield, Audubon, Audubon Park, and Oaklyn.

=== Politics ===
As of March 2011, there were a total of 10,876 registered voters in Haddon Township, of which 4,408 (40.5%) were registered as Democrats, 2,036 (18.7%) were registered as Republicans and 4,415 (40.6%) were registered as Unaffiliated. There were 17 voters registered as Libertarians or Greens.

Gubernatorial election results for Haddon Township
Year	Republican		Democratic		Third party(ies)	
Year	No.	%	No.	%	No.	%
2025	2,347	28.93%	5,729	70.62%	37	0.46%
2021	2,275	35.26%	4,106	63.64%	71	1.10%
2017	1,638	31.83%	3,413	66.32%	95	1.85%
2013	2,834	58.25%	1,941	39.90%	90	1.85%
2009	2,365	43.02%	2,705	49.20%	428	7.78%
2005	2,166	40.86%	2,854	53.84%	281	5.30%

In the 2012 presidential election, Democrat Barack Obama received 60.5% of the vote (4,975 cast), ahead of Republican Mitt Romney with 37.8% (3,104 votes), and other candidates with 1.7% (143 votes), among the 8,272 ballots cast by the township's 11,643 registered voters (50 ballots were spoiled), for a turnout of 71.0%. In the 2008 presidential election, Democrat Barack Obama received 59.7% of the vote (5,185 cast), ahead of Republican John McCain, who received around 37.4% (3,244 votes), with 8,685 ballots cast among the township's 10,887 registered voters, for a turnout of 79.8%. In the 2004 presidential election, Democrat John Kerry received 58.7% of the vote (5,021 ballots cast), outpolling Republican George W. Bush, who received around 39.8% (3,401 votes), with 8,549 ballots cast among the township's 10,762 registered voters, for a turnout percentage of 79.4.

United States presidential election results for Haddon Township
Year	Republican		Democratic		Third party(ies)	
Year	No.	%	No.	%	No.	%
2024	2,961	31.17%	6,368	67.04%	170	1.79%
2020	3,180	32.10%	6,569	66.31%	158	1.59%
2016	2,879	34.26%	5,148	61.26%	377	4.49%
2012	3,104	37.75%	4,975	60.51%	143	1.74%
2008	3,244	37.35%	5,185	59.70%	256	2.95%
2004	3,401	39.78%	5,021	58.73%	127	1.49%

In the 2013 gubernatorial election, Republican Chris Christie received 58.3% of the vote (2,834 cast), ahead of Democrat Barbara Buono with 39.9% (1,941 votes), and other candidates with 1.8% (90 votes), among the 4,978 ballots cast by the township's 11,501 registered voters (113 ballots were spoiled), for a turnout of 43.3%. In the 2009 gubernatorial election, Democrat Jon Corzine received 49.2% of the vote (2,705 ballots cast), ahead of both Republican Chris Christie with 43.0% (2,365 votes) and Independent Chris Daggett with 5.9% (327 votes), with 5,498 ballots cast among the township's 10,864 registered voters, yielding a 50.6% turnout.

United States Senate election results for Haddon Township1
Year	Republican		Democratic		Third party(ies)	
Year	No.	%	No.	%	No.	%
2024	2,812	30.24%	6,374	68.55%	112	1.20%
2018	2,710	36.68%	4,293	58.10%	386	5.22%
2012	2,906	43.41%	3,708	55.39%	80	1.20%
2006	2,273	40.52%	3,215	57.32%	121	2.16%

United States Senate election results for Haddon Township2
Year	Republican		Democratic		Third party(ies)	
Year	No.	%	No.	%	No.	%
2020	3,320	33.90%	6,377	65.12%	96	0.98%
2014	1,779	39.09%	2,705	59.44%	67	1.47%
2013	1,180	39.05%	1,807	59.79%	35	1.16%
2008	3,258	40.45%	4,653	57.77%	144	1.79%

== Education ==
The Haddon Township School District serves public school students in pre-kindergarten through twelfth grade. As of the 2024–25 school year, the district, comprised of seven schools, had an enrollment of 2,100 students and 160.0 classroom teachers (on an FTE basis), for a student–teacher ratio of 13.1:1. Schools in the district (with 2024–25 enrollment data from the National Center for Education Statistics) are Thomas A. Edison Elementary School with 159 students in grades PreK–5, Clyde S. Jennings Elementary School with 123 students in grades K–5, Stoy Elementary School with 174 students in grades PreK–5, Strawbridge Elementary School with 244 students in grades K–5, Van Sciver Elementary School with 345 students in grades PreK–5, William G. Rohrer Middle School with 414 students in grades 6–8 and Haddon Township High School with 609 students in grades 9–12.

Prior to the establishment of Haddon Township High School in the 1960s, most Haddon Township students attended Collingswood High School, while some attended Haddonfield Memorial High School or Audubon High School.

Paul VI High School is a regional high school founded in September 1966 that operates under the oversight of the Roman Catholic Diocese of Camden with an enrollment of over 1,000 students. Holy Saviour School was an elementary school that operated under the auspices of the Camden diocese until it closed in 2008.

=== Library ===
Haddon Township is part of the Camden County Library System; the Haddon Township Branch library is located on MacArthur Boulevard.

== Transportation ==
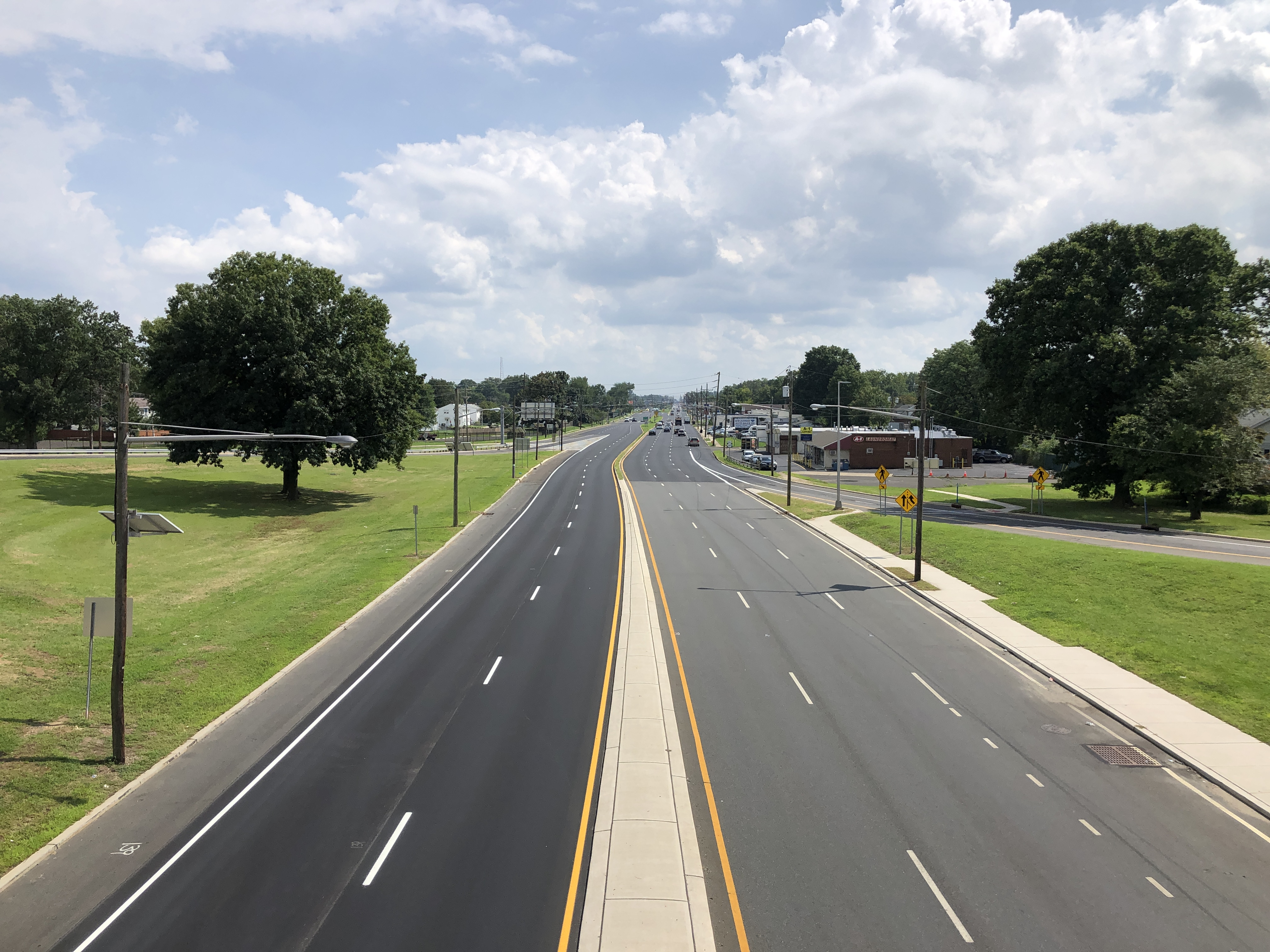
Route 168 southbound along Haddon Township's border with Audubon Park

=== Public transportation ===
Westmont station, in the downtown section of Haddon Township, is a PATCO Park-and-Ride station.

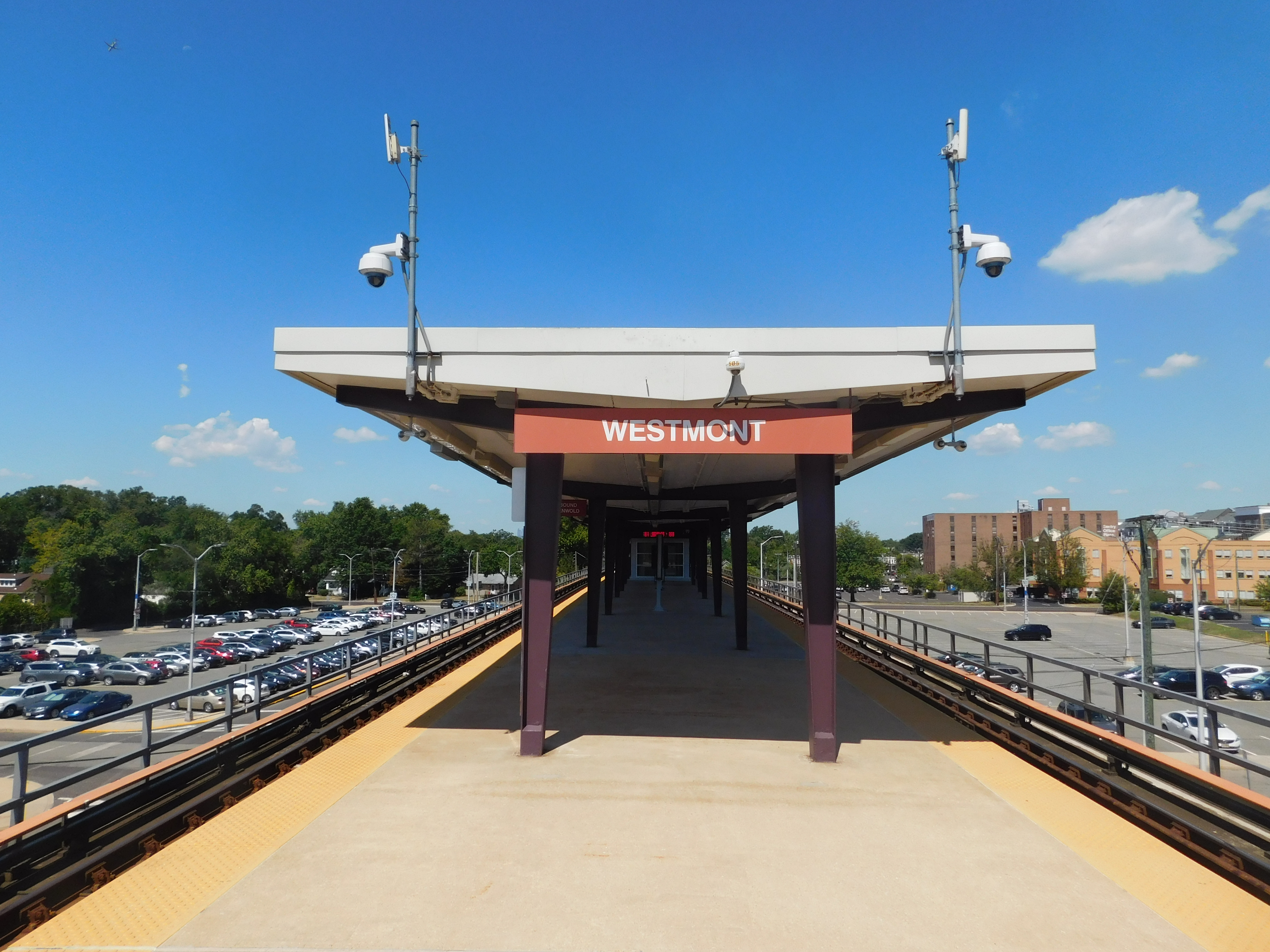
Westmont Station

NJ Transit provides bus service between the township and Philadelphia on the 403 route, with local service available on the 450 and 451 routes.

=== Roads and highways ===
As of May 2010, the township had a total of 51.83 miles (83.41 km) of roadways, of which 39.96 miles (64.31 km) were maintained by the municipality, 9.73 miles (15.66 km) by Camden County and 2.14 miles (3.44 km) by the New Jersey Department of Transportation.

U.S. Route 30 and County Route 561 are the main highways serving the eastern portion of Haddon Township. U.S. Route 130 and New Jersey Route 168 are the main highways serving the western segment. The eastern terminus of New Jersey Route 76C is also within the western segment of Haddon Township.

== Points of interest ==
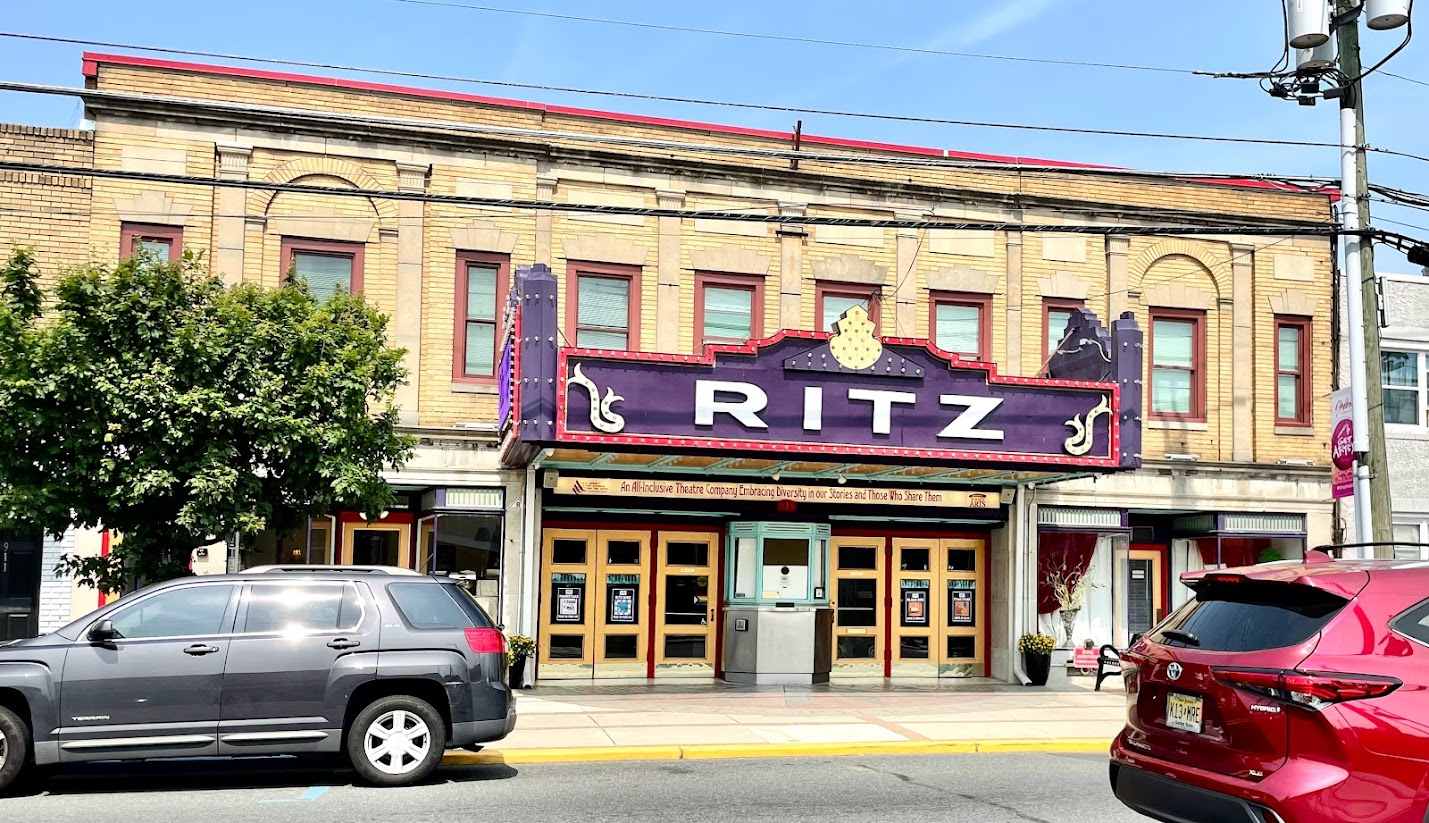
The Ritz Theater, Haddon Township

- Newton Union Schoolhouse (also called The Champion School), a one-room school house built in 1821
- Ritz Theatre is an active live producing theatre company, built in a Colonial Revival style in 1927 as a vaudeville theatre. In 2002, the Ritz was added to the New Jersey and National Register of Historic Places.
- Saddler's Woods protects 25.8 acres (10.4 ha) of old-growth forest just 5 miles (8.0 km) from Philadelphia.

== Notable people ==
People who were born in, residents of, or otherwise closely associated with Haddon Township include:

- Mitch Albom (born 1958), writer
- Laurie Beechman (1953–1998), Broadway actress
- Tony Black (born 1951), record-holding jockey in North American Thoroughbred horse racing
- William B. Brahms (born 1966), librarian and encyclopedist
- George E. Brunner (1896–1975), mayor of Camden, New Jersey from 1936 to 1959
- William K. Dickey (1920–2008), lawyer and politician who served as Speaker of the New Jersey General Assembly and as chairman of the Delaware River Port Authority
- Mark Donohue (1937–1975), race car driver
- Joe Flacco (born 1985), NFL Quarterback
- Larry Kane (born 1942), only American reporter to travel with The Beatles on their 1964 North American tour
- John McCarthy (1916–1998), football player and coach
- Don McComb (1934–2018), defensive end who played for the Boston Patriots
- Samuel Vaughan Merrick (1801–1870), first President of the Pennsylvania Railroad and co-founder of the Franklin Institute
- Cozy Morley (c. 1926–2013), entertainer, singer
- Sal Paolantonio (born 1956), ESPN reporter and writer
- Mary Roebling (1905–1994), banker, businesswoman, and philanthropist who was the first woman to serve as president of a major U.S. bank
- William G. Rohrer (1909–1989), founder of First Peoples Bank of New Jersey, the first bank in South Jersey to reach $1 billion in deposits, and mayor of Haddon Township for 36 years
- Peter Schwartz (born 1946), futurist, innovator, author, and co-founder of the Global Business Network
- Hannah Whitall Smith (1832–1911), author in the Holiness movement and suffragette
- Steven Spielberg (born 1946), motion picture director and producer
- John M. Whitall (1800–1877), glass manufacturer and philanthropist
- Julianna White (born 1988), Miss New Jersey USA 2011
