= Woodlynne, New Jersey =

Borough in Camden County, New Jersey, US

- Borough
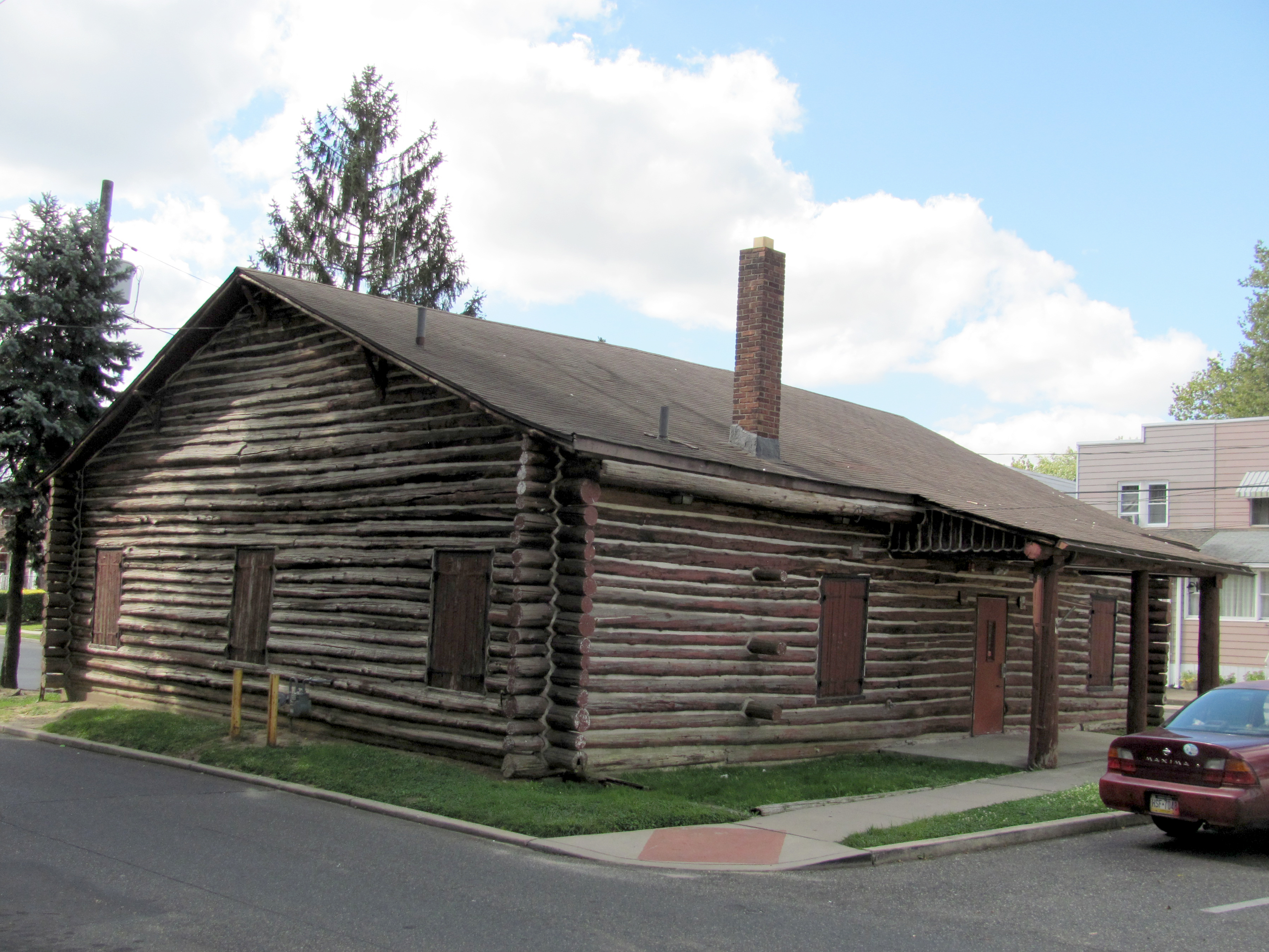
- Woodlynne Log Cabin

- Seal

- Location of Woodlynne in Camden County highlighted and circled in red (right). Inset map: Location of Camden County in New Jersey highlighted in red (left).

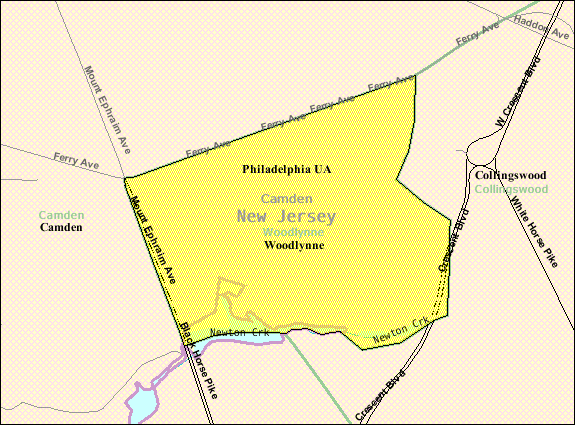
- Census Bureau map of Woodlynne, New Jersey

- Location in Camden County Location in New Jersey Location in the United States
- Coordinates: 39.916478°N 75.095549°W
- Country: United States
- State: New Jersey
- County: Camden
- Settled: 1681
- Incorporated: March 19, 1901

Government
  - Type: Borough
  - Body: Borough Council
  - Mayor: Joseph Chukwueke (D, term ends December 31, 2023)
  - Administrator: Luis Pastoriza

Area
  - Total: 0.22 sq mi (0.58 km^{2})
  - Land: 0.22 sq mi (0.56 km^{2})
  - Water: 0.0077 sq mi (0.02 km^{2}) 3.04%
  - Rank: 558th of 565 in state 35th of 37 in county
- Elevation: 20 ft (6.1 m)

Population (2020)
  - Total: 2,902
  - Estimate (2023): 2,909
  - Rank: 452nd of 565 in state 29th of 37 in county
  - Density: 13,338.4/sq mi (5,150.0/km^{2})
  - Rank: 21st of 565 in state 1st of 37 in county
- Time zone: UTC−05:00 (Eastern (EST))
  - Summer (DST): UTC−04:00 (Eastern (EDT))
- ZIP Code: 08107
- Area code: 856
- FIPS code: 3400782450
- GNIS feature ID: 0885450
- Website: www.woodlynnenj.org

Woodlynne is a borough in Camden County, within the U.S. state of New Jersey, and a suburb located 4 miles (6.4 km) southeast of Philadelphia. As of the 2020 United States census, the borough's population was 2,902, a decrease of 76 (−2.6%) from the 2,978 recorded at the 2010 census, which in turn reflected an increase of 182 (+6.5%) from the 2,796 counted in the 2000 census. The borough is the state's eighth-smallest municipality. Established on the site of a defunct amusement park, the entire borough of Woodlynne is less than one-third the size of Six Flags Great Adventure and Safari.

Woodlynne was incorporated as a borough by an act of the New Jersey Legislature on March 19, 1901, from portions of Haddon Township. In 1906, the City of Camden made an unsuccessful attempt to annex Woodlynne.

Woodlynne had the highest property tax rate in New Jersey, with an equalized rate of 7.384% in 2020, compared to a statewide average of 2.279% and 3.470% in Camden County. As of the 2010 census, Woodlynne was also home to the highest percentage of Vietnamese residents in New Jersey, at 6.9%.

== History ==
First settled by Europeans in 1681, a property owned by Mark Newbie was called Lynnewood, named for the linden trees in the area. The name was changed from Lynnewood to Woodlynne in 1892, due to conflicts with the name of another municipality.

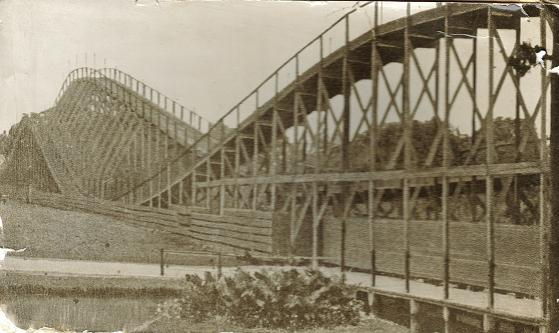
The old scenic railway in Woodlynne Amusement Park.

Woodlynne Amusement Park, which encompassed Woodlynne Lake (no longer in existence), operated between the years 1895 and 1914 in the area that now comprises the town of Woodlynne. The New Camden Land Improvement Company commissioned the creation of Woodlynne Amusement Park on the estate of Charles M. Cooper in 1892. Homes built over the old lake tend to flood in the basements during heavy rainstorms.

The Camden and Suburban Railway Company, formed in 1896, established a housing development in a section of Woodlynne Amusement Park, which contributed to its incorporation as Woodlynne Borough in 1901.

== Geography ==
Woodlynne Lake

According to the United States Census Bureau, the borough had a total area of 0.23 square miles (0.58 km^{2}), including 0.22 square miles (0.56 km^{2}) of land and 0.01 square miles (0.02 km^{2}) of water (3.04%).

Woodlynne borders the Borough of Collingswood and the City of Camden.

=== Climate ===
The climate in this area is characterized by hot, humid summers and generally mild to cool winters. According to the Köppen Climate Classification system, Woodlynne has a humid subtropical climate, abbreviated "Cfa" on climate maps.

== Demographics ==
Historical population
| Census | Pop. | Note | %± |
|---|---|---|---|
| 1900 | 388 | | — |
| 1910 | 500 | | 28.9% |
| 1920 | 1,515 | | 203.0% |
| 1930 | 2,878 | | 90.0% |
| 1940 | 2,861 | | −0.6% |
| 1950 | 2,776 | | −3.0% |
| 1960 | 3,128 | | 12.7% |
| 1970 | 3,101 | | −0.9% |
| 1980 | 2,578 | | −16.9% |
| 1990 | 2,547 | | −1.2% |
| 2000 | 2,796 | | 9.8% |
| 2010 | 2,978 | | 6.5% |
| 2020 | 2,902 | | −2.6% |
| 2023 (est.) | 2,909 | ▲ | 0.2% |
Population sources: 1900–2000 1900–1920; 1900–1910 1910–1930; 1940–2000 2000; 2010 2020

=== 2020 census ===
As of the 2020 census, Woodlynne had a population of 2,902. The median age was 32.5 years. 27.8% of residents were under the age of 18 and 9.2% of residents were 65 years of age or older. For every 100 females there were 99.2 males, and for every 100 females age 18 and over there were 91.4 males age 18 and over.

100.0% of residents lived in urban areas, while 0.0% lived in rural areas.

There were 902 households in Woodlynne, of which 46.0% had children under the age of 18 living in them. Of all households, 33.3% were married-couple households, 19.3% were households with a male householder and no spouse or partner present, and 37.6% were households with a female householder and no spouse or partner present. About 18.6% of all households were made up of individuals and 5.2% had someone living alone who was 65 years of age or older.

There were 999 housing units, of which 9.7% were vacant. The homeowner vacancy rate was 4.3% and the rental vacancy rate was 9.3%.

Racial composition as of the 2020 census
| Race | Number | Percent |
|---|---|---|
| White | 474 | 16.3% |
| Black or African American | 982 | 33.8% |
| American Indian and Alaska Native | 41 | 1.4% |
| Asian | 266 | 9.2% |
| Native Hawaiian and Other Pacific Islander | 1 | 0.0% |
| Some other race | 834 | 28.7% |
| Two or more races | 304 | 10.5% |
| Hispanic or Latino (of any race) | 1,290 | 44.5% |

=== 2010 census ===
The 2010 United States census counted 2,978 people, 917 households, and 700 families in the borough. The population density was 13,600.4 per square mile (5,251.1/km^{2}). There were 1,016 housing units at an average density of 4,640.0 per square mile (1,791.5/km^{2}). The racial makeup was 28.17% (839) White, 33.55% (999) Black or African American, 0.71% (21) Native American, 9.70% (289) Asian, 0.03% (1) Pacific Islander, 23.10% (688) from other races, and 4.73% (141) from two or more races. Hispanic or Latino of any race were 38.28% (1,140) of the population.

Of the 917 households, 42.5% had children under the age of 18; 37.6% were married couples living together; 31.0% had a female householder with no husband present and 23.7% were non-families. Of all households, 18.6% were made up of individuals and 4.6% had someone living alone who was 65 years of age or older. The average household size was 3.25 and the average family size was 3.67.

30.2% of the population were under the age of 18, 12.9% from 18 to 24, 29.9% from 25 to 44, 20.8% from 45 to 64, and 6.1% who were 65 years of age or older. The median age was 29.3 years. For every 100 females, the population had 97.7 males. For every 100 females ages 18 and older there were 90.6 males.

The Census Bureau's 2006–2010 American Community Survey showed that (in 2010 inflation-adjusted dollars) median household income was $41,516 (with a margin of error of +/− $6,233) and the median family income was $45,313 (+/− $17,965). Males had a median income of $39,020 (+/− $7,398) versus $32,688 (+/− $8,474) for females. The per capita income for the borough was $18,210 (+/− $2,557). About 14.8% of families and 14.2% of the population were below the poverty line, including 20.9% of those under age 18 and none of those age 65 or over.

=== 2000 census ===
As of the 2000 United States census there were 2,796 people, 912 households, and 684 families residing in the borough. The population density was 12,939.4 inhabitants per square mile (4,995.9/km^{2}). There were 1,012 housing units at an average density of 4,683.4 per square mile (1,808.3/km^{2}). The racial makeup of the borough was 48.43% White, 22.71% African American, 0.57% Native American, 12.27% Asian, 11.59% from other races, and 4.43% from two or more races. Hispanic or Latino of any race were 20.60% of the population.

There were 912 households, out of which 42.4% had children under the age of 18 living with them, 42.1% were married couples living together, 25.0% had a female householder with no husband present, and 25.0% were non-families. 20.7% of all households were made up of individuals, and 7.5% had someone living alone who was 65 years of age or older. The average household size was 3.07 and the average family size was 3.52.

In the borough the population was spread out, with 32.4% under the age of 18, 8.7% from 18 to 24, 31.3% from 25 to 44, 18.8% from 45 to 64, and 8.7% who were 65 years of age or older. The median age was 31 years. For every 100 females, there were 95.0 males. For every 100 females age 18 and over, there were 85.6 males.

The median income for a household in the borough was $39,138, and the median income for a family was $39,669. Males had a median income of $33,520 versus $26,885 for females. The per capita income for the borough was $14,757. About 11.7% of families and 13.9% of the population were below the poverty line, including 21.5% of those under age 18 and 6.2% of those age 65 or over.

== Government ==
=== Local government ===
Woodlynne is governed under the borough form of New Jersey municipal government, which is used in 218 municipalities (of the 564) statewide, making it the most common form of government in New Jersey. The governing body is comprised of a mayor and a borough council, with all positions elected at-large on a partisan basis as part of the November general election. A mayor is elected directly by the voters to a four-year term of office. The borough council includes six members elected to serve three-year terms on a staggered basis, with two seats coming up for election each year in a three-year cycle. The borough form of government used by Woodlynne is a "weak mayor / strong council" government in which council members act as the legislative body with the mayor presiding at meetings and voting only in the event of a tie. The mayor can veto ordinances subject to an override by a two-thirds majority vote of the council. The mayor makes committee and liaison assignments for council members, and most appointments are made by the mayor with the advice and consent of the council.

As of 2023, the mayor of Woodlynne Borough is Democrat Joseph Chukwueke, whose term of office ends December 31, 2027. Members of the Woodlynne Borough Council are Council President Sharon Earley (D, 2024), Lavar Edwards (D, 2023), Shana K. Feliciano (D, 2025), Edwin Fontanez (D, 2025), Pablo Fuentes (D, 2023) and Wilfredo Rodriguez (D, 2024).

After a four-year period in which police officers from Collingswood patrolled the borough's streets, Woodlynne re-established its police department in September 2010.

=== Federal, state and county representation ===
Woodlynne is located in the 1st Congressional District and is part of New Jersey's 5th state legislative district.

For the 119th United States Congress, New Jersey's 1st congressional district is represented by Donald Norcross (D, Camden). New Jersey is represented in the United States Senate by Democrats Cory Booker (Newark, term ends 2027) and Andy Kim (Moorestown, term ends 2031).

For the 2026–2027 session, the 5th legislative district of the New Jersey Legislature is represented in the State Senate by Nilsa Cruz-Perez (D, Barrington) and in the General Assembly by Bill Moen (D, Camden) and William Spearman (D, Camden).

Camden County is governed by a Board of County Commissioners composed of seven members chosen at-large in partisan elections for three-year terms on a staggered basis by the residents of the county, with either two or three seats up for election each year as part of the November general election. At a reorganization meeting held in January after each election, the newly constituted Board of Commissioners selects one member to serve as Director and another as Deputy Director, each serving a one-year term in that role. As of 2025, Camden County's Commissioners are: Commissioner Director Louis Cappelli Jr. (D, Collingswood, 2026), Commissioner Deputy Director Edward T. McDonnell (D, Pennsauken Township, 2025), Virginia Ruiz Betteridge (D, Runnemede, 2025), Almar Dyer (D, Pennsauken Township, 2027), Melinda Kane (D, Cherry Hill, 2027), Jeffrey L. Nash (D, Winslow Township, 2027), and Jonathan L. Young Sr. (D, Berlin Township, 2026).

Camden County's constitutional officers are: Clerk Pamela Rosen Lampitt (D, Cherry Hill, 2029) Sheriff Chuck Billingham (D, Gloucester City, 2027) and Surrogate Michelle Gentek-Mayer (D, Gloucester Township, 2025).

=== Politics ===
As of March 2011, there were a total of 1,553 registered voters in Woodlynne, of which 661 (42.6%) were registered as Democrats, 85 (5.5%) were registered as Republicans and 804 (51.8%) were registered as Unaffiliated. There were 3 voters registered as Libertarians or Greens.

Gubernatorial election results for Woodlyne
| Year | Republican | | Democratic | | Third party(ies) | |
| Year | No. | % | No. | % | No. | % |
|---|---|---|---|---|---|---|
| 2025 | 93 | 16.37% | 471 | 82.92% | 4 | 0.70% |
| 2021 | 76 | 21.41% | 277 | 78.03% | 2 | 0.56% |
| 2017 | 85 | 22.73% | 285 | 76.20% | 4 | 1.07% |
| 2013 | 140 | 36.65% | 240 | 62.83% | 2 | 0.52% |
| 2009 | 105 | 23.44% | 305 | 68.08% | 38 | 8.48% |
| 2005 | 128 | 26.72% | 321 | 67.01% | 30 | 6.26% |

In the 2012 presidential election, Democrat Barack Obama received 86.8% of the vote (826 cast), ahead of Republican Mitt Romney with 12.6% (120 votes), and other candidates with 0.6% (6 votes), among the 959 ballots cast by the borough's 1,714 registered voters (7 ballots were spoiled), for a turnout of 56.0%. In the 2008 presidential election, Democrat Barack Obama received 79.4% of the vote (786 cast), ahead of Republican John McCain, who received around 16.6% (164 votes), with 990 ballots cast among the borough's 1,531 registered voters, for a turnout of 64.7%. In the 2004 presidential election, Democrat John Kerry received 71.5% of the vote (639 ballots cast), outpolling Republican George W. Bush, who received around 27.2% (243 votes), with 894 ballots cast among the borough's 1,465 registered voters, for a turnout percentage of 61.0.

United States presidential election results for Woodlynne
| Year | Republican | | Democratic | | Third party(ies) | |
| Year | No. | % | No. | % | No. | % |
|---|---|---|---|---|---|---|
| 2024 | 194 | 24.19% | 599 | 74.69% | 9 | 1.12% |
| 2020 | 186 | 19.38% | 764 | 79.58% | 10 | 1.04% |
| 2016 | 131 | 14.30% | 753 | 82.21% | 32 | 3.49% |
| 2012 | 120 | 12.61% | 826 | 86.76% | 6 | 0.63% |
| 2008 | 164 | 16.57% | 786 | 79.39% | 40 | 4.04% |
| 2004 | 243 | 27.18% | 639 | 71.48% | 12 | 1.34% |

In the 2013 gubernatorial election, Democrat Barbara Buono received 62.8% of the vote (240 cast), ahead of Republican Chris Christie with 36.6% (140 votes), and other candidates with 0.5% (2 votes), among the 394 ballots cast by the borough's 1,697 registered voters (12 ballots were spoiled), for a turnout of 23.2%. In the 2009 gubernatorial election, Democrat Jon Corzine received 68.1% of the vote (305 ballots cast), ahead of both Republican Chris Christie with 23.4% (105 votes) and Independent Chris Daggett with 3.1% (14 votes), with 448 ballots cast among the borough's 1,530 registered voters, yielding a 29.3% turnout.

United States Senate election results for Woodlyne1
| Year | Republican | | Democratic | | Third party(ies) | |
| Year | No. | % | No. | % | No. | % |
|---|---|---|---|---|---|---|
| 2024 | 167 | 21.69% | 592 | 76.88% | 11 | 1.43% |
| 2018 | 91 | 15.37% | 468 | 79.05% | 33 | 5.57% |
| 2012 | 105 | 11.72% | 783 | 87.39% | 8 | 0.89% |
| 2006 | 96 | 24.62% | 280 | 71.79% | 14 | 3.59% |

United States Senate election results for Woodlyne2
| Year | Republican | | Democratic | | Third party(ies) | |
| Year | No. | % | No. | % | No. | % |
|---|---|---|---|---|---|---|
| 2020 | 169 | 17.88% | 762 | 80.63% | 14 | 1.48% |
| 2014 | 60 | 14.71% | 341 | 83.58% | 7 | 1.72% |
| 2013 | 20 | 8.62% | 212 | 91.38% | 0 | 0.00% |
| 2008 | 145 | 17.30% | 674 | 80.43% | 19 | 2.27% |

== Education ==
The Woodlynne School District serves public school students in pre-kindergarten through eighth grade at Woodlynne Elementary School. As of the 2019–20 school year, the district, comprised of one school, had an enrollment of 403 students and 33.1 classroom teachers (on an FTE basis), for a student–teacher ratio of 12.2:1.

Students in public school for ninth through twelfth grades attend Collingswood High School in neighboring Collingswood as part of a sending/receiving relationship with the Collingswood Public Schools, together with students from Oaklyn, New Jersey. As of the 2019–20 school year, the high school had an enrollment of 718 students and 64.5 classroom teachers (on an FTE basis), for a student–teacher ratio of 11.1:1.

== Transportation ==
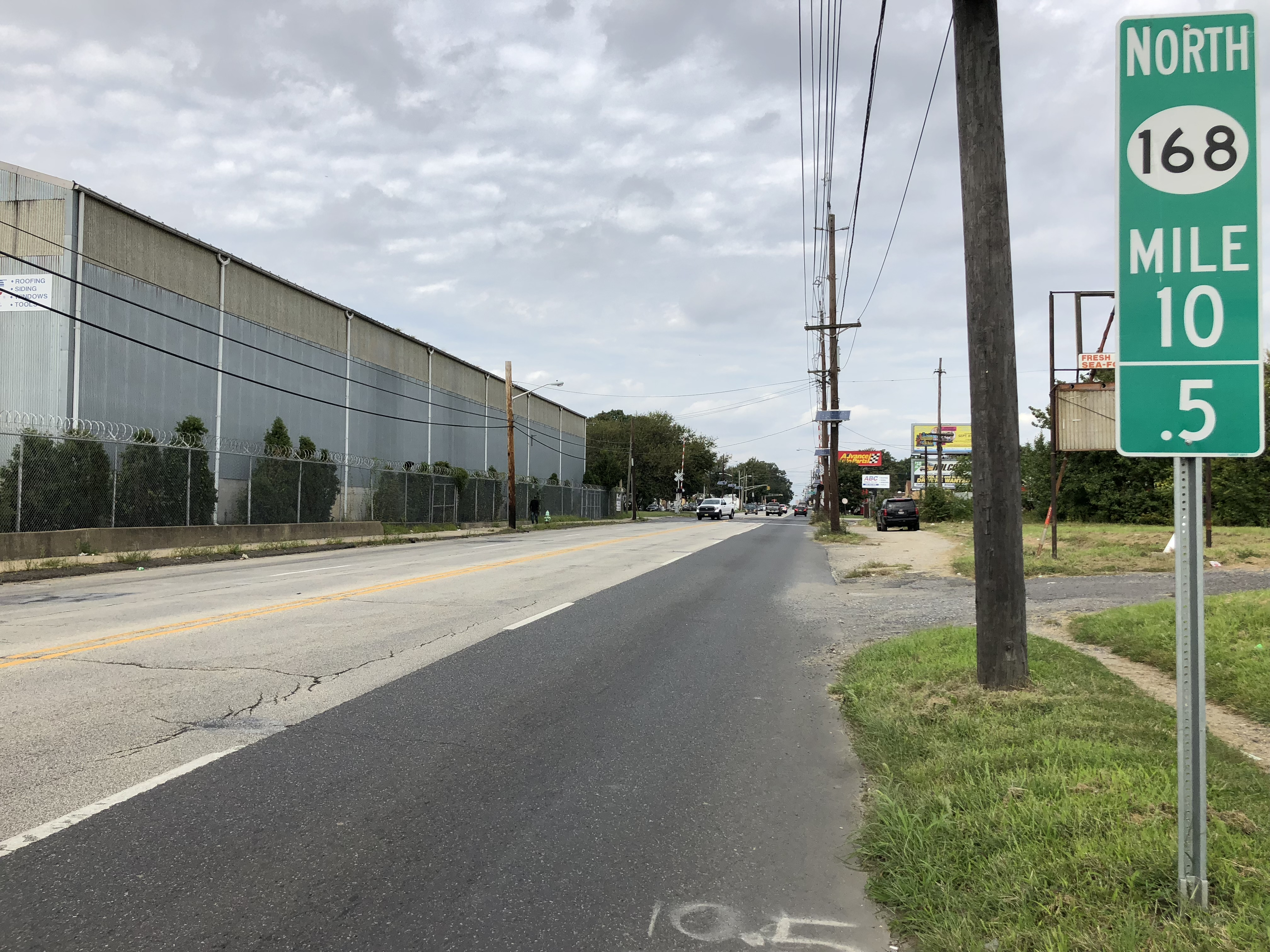
Route 168 northbound on the west edge of Woodlynne

=== Roads and highways ===
As of May 2010, the borough had a total of 5.69 miles (9.16 km) of roadways, of which 5.20 miles (8.37 km) were maintained by the municipality, 0.30 miles (0.48 km) by Camden County and 0.19 miles (0.31 km) by the New Jersey Department of Transportation.

New Jersey Route 168 and U.S. Route 130 are the main highways serving Woodlynne. Route 168 skims the western border of Woodlynne, while US 130 brushes the eastern edge of the borough.

=== Public transportation ===
The Ferry Avenue station, located in Woodlynne and Camden, provides PATCO Speedline service between the 15–16th & Locust station in Philadelphia and the Lindenwold station.

NJ Transit bus service is available on routes 400 (between Sicklerville and Philadelphia), 403 (between Turnersville and Camden via Lindenwold PATCO station), 450 (between Cherry Hill and Camden via Audubon) and 453 (between Ferry Avenue PATCO station and Camden).

== Points of interest ==
- The Woodlynne war memorial, commemorating residents of Woodlynne who lost their lives in World War I, World War II, the Korean War, and the Vietnam War, is located on Woodlynne Avenue.
