= Ferry Avenue station =

Rapid transit station in New Jersey

Ferry Avenue
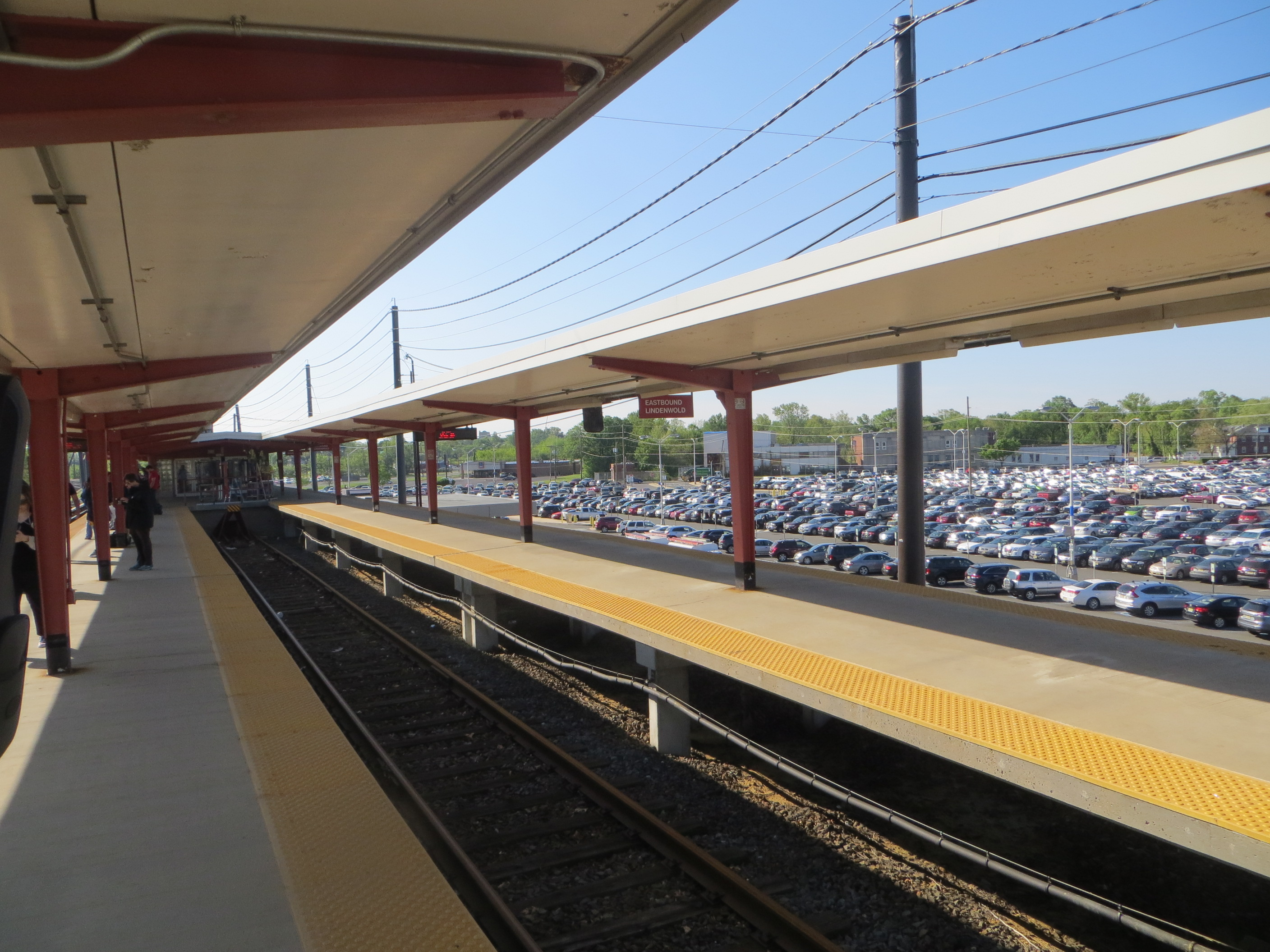
- Ferry Avenue station in May 2018

General information
- Location: 2600 Ferry Avenue; Camden, New Jersey
- Coordinates: 39°55′22″N 75°5′30″W
- Owner: Delaware River Port Authority
- Platforms: 1 bay island platform
- Tracks: 3 (1 pocket track)
- Connections: NJ Transit Bus: 451, 453

Construction
- Parking: 1,900 spaces
- Cycle facilities: Racks
- Accessible: Yes

History
- Opened: January 4, 1969

Passengers
- 2025: 1,314 (average weekday)
- Rank: 6 of 14

Services
Preceding station	DRPA	Following station
Broadway toward 15–16th & Locust	PATCO Speedline	Collingswood toward Lindenwold
Location

Ferry Avenue station is a PATCO Speedline station located in Camden and Woodlynne, in Camden County, New Jersey, United States. It is near the busy US Route 130 and situated near the intersection of Camden, Woodlynne and Collingswood.

== Station layout ==
The fare control is located at street level and the platform is elevated. For most of the platform, there are two tracks, serving the Philadelphia and Lindenwold bound trains. There is also a third track that starts halfway down the platform. The platform splits and the train can come up into this spot. It was once used by Ferry Avenue Local trains that originated here and went to Philadelphia, but Ferry Avenue Local trains were replaced with Woodcrest Local trains on September 20, 1980. The third track is now used to store a train mid-day.

== Crime ==
On August 9, 1995, Philadelphia Inquirer truck driver Joseph Sweeney, 49, was fatally beaten during a robbery while delivering newspapers.

On November 12, 2001, Christine Lynn Eberle, 27, a PATCO commuter and resident of Washington Township, Gloucester County, New Jersey was abducted from the station's parking lot and killed. Two men, Ryshaone H. Thomas and Marcus Toliver, were charged with murder, robbery, kidnapping and weapons offenses in connection with the crime. On January 12, 2005, Thomas and Toliver pleaded guilty in New Jersey Superior Court in order to avoid the death penalty.

== Notable places nearby ==
The station is within walking distance of the following notable places:

- Harleigh Cemetery
- Virtua Our Lady of Lourdes Hospital
