= List of NJ Transit bus routes (450–499) =

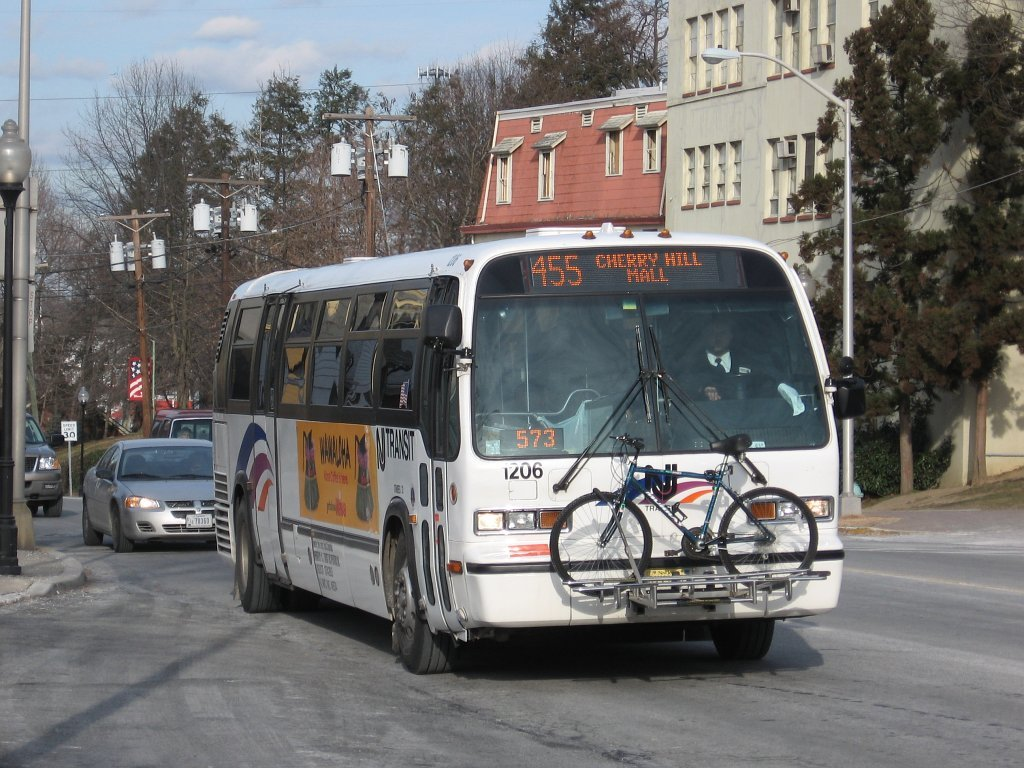
NJ Transit Nova RTS bus 1206 operates through Woodbury on route 455

New Jersey Transit operates or contracts out the following routes within Camden, Gloucester, and Salem counties. All routes are "exact fare" lines.

== Routes ==
=== Directly operated ===
These routes are operated directly by New Jersey Transit.

Route	Terminals		Main streets	Notes	History	Garage
450	Camden; WRTC	Cherry Hill Mall	Black Horse Pike, Cuthbert Road, Crystal Lake Avenue		Formerly route A	Newton Avenue
451	Camden; WRTC	Voorhees Town Center	Haddon Avenue/Haddonfield-Berlin Road, Evesham Road	Weekday service only	Formerly route B; Service to Ferry Avenue PATCO initiated on January 10, 2009.; Cut back from Lindenwold PATCO to Voorhees Town Center on September 1, 2012.	Newton Avenue
452	Camden; 36th Street	Camden; The Salvation Army Ray & Joan Kroc Corps Community Centers	State Street, Market and Federal Streets, Kaighns Avenue, Baird Boulevard		Cut back from 49th Street in Pennsauken to end at 36th Street Station on April 3, 2004.; Formerly route C	Newton Avenue
453	Camden; Federal St / Delaware Ave	Camden; Ferry Avenue PATCO	Broadway	No Sunday service	Formerly route E	Newton Avenue
455	Paulsboro; Broad St / Billingsport Ave, or National Park; Grove St / Hessian Ave	Cherry Hill Mall	Crown Point Road (Paulsboro trips only), Red Bank Avenue, Clements Bridge Road, Kings Highway, Church Road		Service to Kingston Estates discontinued on August 30, 2025.; Formerly route R	Newton Avenue
457	Camden; Federal St / Delaware Ave	Moorestown Mall	Broadway, Market Street, Kings Highway, Church Road, Fellowship Road	Service operating on Sunday is part of a pilot program effective April 2021.	Formerly route V	Newton Avenue
459	Sicklerville; Avandale Park/Ride	Voorhees Town Center	Sicklerville Road, Laurel Road / White Horse Road		Formerly route U	Washington Township
463	Sicklerville; Avandale Park/Ride	Woodbury; Broad St / Red Bank Ave	Main Street, Egg Harbor Road, Tanyard Road	Weekday Service Only		Washington Township

=== Contract operations ===
This line is operated for New Jersey Transit by Salem County Transit, and is an exact fare line.

Route	Terminals		Major streets	Notes	History
468	Carney's Point; Carney's Point Senior Apartments (limited service); Penns Grove; Sandy Ridge Apartments (Monday-Saturday)	Mannington; Memorial Hospital of Salem County (Monday-Saturday); Woodstown; Acme at route 45 and 40 (weekdays only)	Broadway, Salem Woodstown Road	No Sunday service	Service was extended to Quinton on January 4, 2003, and then discontinued on June 24, 2006.; Service extended to Project Freedom in Woodstown on January 14, 2017.; Formerly route 108

== Former routes ==
This list includes routes that have been renumbered or are now operated by private companies.

Route	Terminals		Major streets	Current status	Notes
AquaLink	Camden; WRTC	Adventure Aquarium	Federal Street	Merged into NJT route 452	
454	Lindenwold (PATCO station)	Haddonfield (PATCO station)	Warwick Road	Absorbed by route 451 on September 4, 2004; segment later eliminated completely on January 28, 2006.	Formerly route K before 454
456	Camden	Cherry Hill Mall	Federal Street	Route was extended into Philadelphia and renamed 405; was cut back to Camden again January 8, 2011 but retained 405 designation	Formerly route 6 before 456
458	Burlington	Lumberton Plaza	Burlington County Route 541	Merged into NJT route 413	Formerly route X before 458
460	Camden; Various: WRTC, State St. at 4th St., Brimm Medical Arts High School, Creative Arts Morgan Village Academy, Bridge Plaza	Camden; Various: Woodrow Wilson High School, River Rd. and 36th St., Bridge Plaza, WRTC	Various streets in Camden	460 Designation for schools service; Discontinued on September 2, 2017.	Seasonal school service only
461	Deptford Mall	Paulsboro	Crown Point Road	Merged into NJT route 455	
