= Bay platform =

Dead-end railway platform at a railway station that has through lines

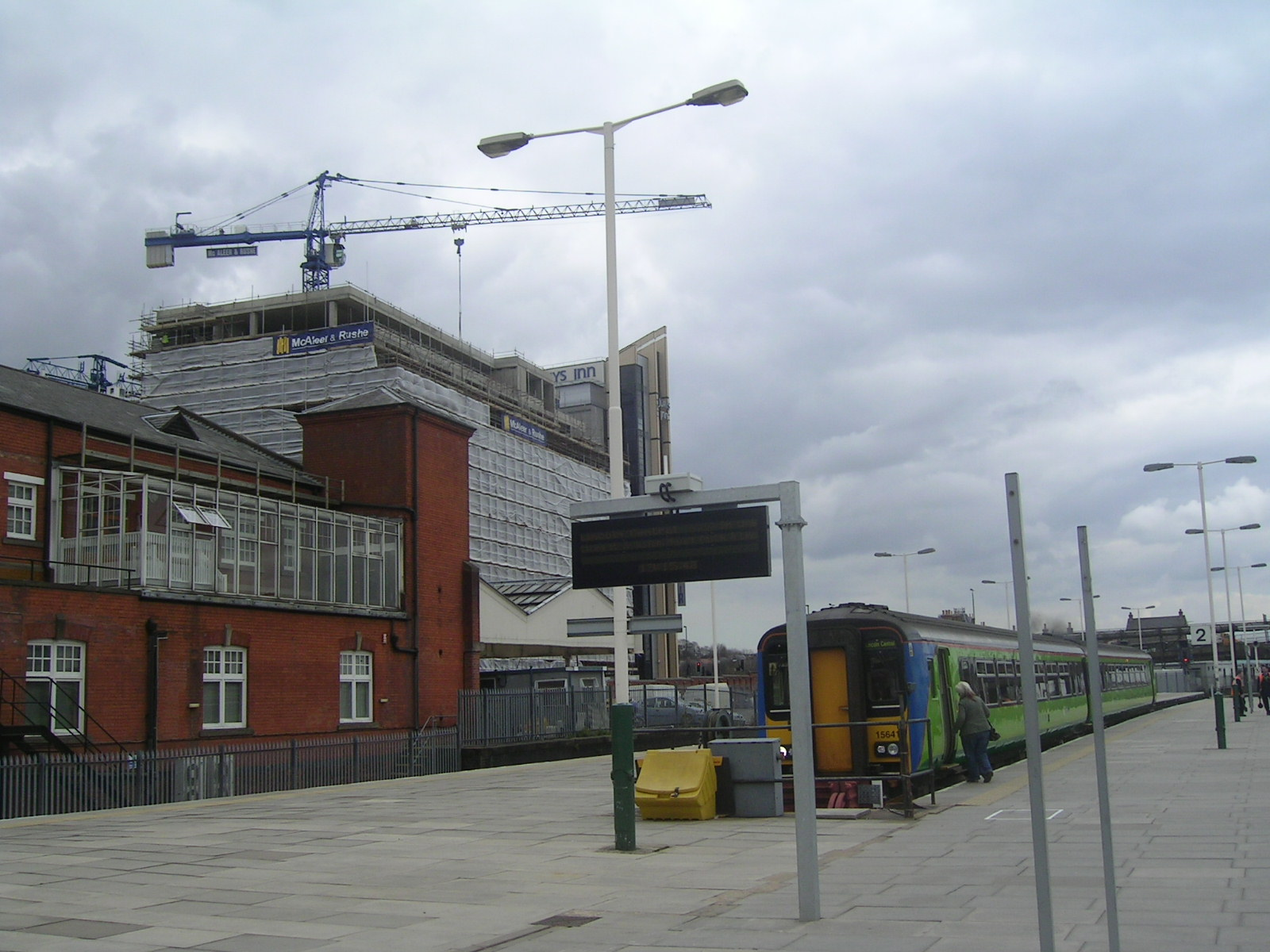
Bay platform at Nottingham station, 2006

A bay platform is a dead-end railway platform at a railway station which also has through lines. It is normal for bay platforms to be shorter than their associated through platforms. They must have a buffer stop at one end for safety.

== Overview ==
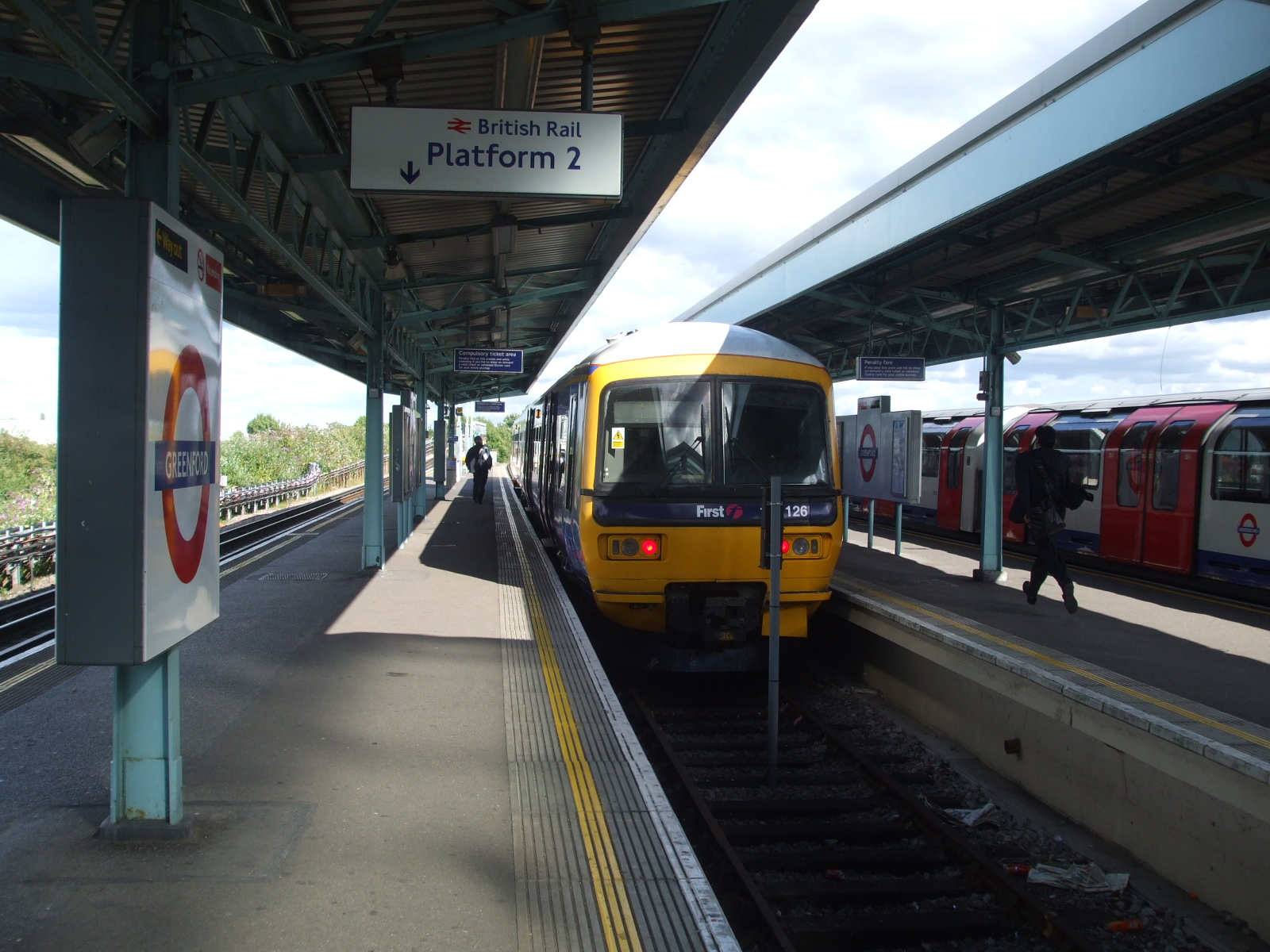
Bay platform at Greenford station, 2008

Bay and island platforms are so named because they resemble the eponymous geographic features.

Bay platforms are in use in the United Kingdom, in Australia, and the United States. Examples of stations with bay platforms include Carlisle railway station, Ryde Pier Head railway station, Nottingham railway station (pictured), which has a bay platform inset into one of its platform islands.

The San Francisco International Airport BART Station has three bay platforms, two of which are in use. Chicago's CTA O'Hare Airport Station features a bay platform with one track on the bay and a track on each side of the platform. Millennium Station in Chicago has several bay platforms for the South Shore Line and Metra. The Hoboken Terminal and 33rd Street Station on the PATH line have bay platforms. Ferry Avenue on the PATCO Speedline also has a bay platform. In the New York City Subway, but such platforms are thought of as side or island platforms connected at the ends, rather than bay platforms.

Trains using a bay platform have to reverse direction and depart in the direction from which they arrived.

== Dock platforms ==
Dock platforms are similar to bay platforms in geometry but are generally shorter and used to unload freight.
