= Moorestown Mall =

Coordinates: 39.9436°N 74.9629°W

- Location: Moorestown, New Jersey, United States
- Opened: 1963
- Developer: Winston-Muss Corporation
- Manager: PREIT
- Owner: PREIT
- Num. of stores: 68 (90+ at peak)
- Num. of anchor tenants: 4
- Floor area: 1,059,405 square feet (98,421.9 m^{2})
- Floors: 1 (2 in Boscov's and Parky's, 3 in Cooper University Health Care, unused 2nd floor in former Macy's building)
- Public transit: NJ Transit bus: 317, 407, 413, 414, 418, 457
- Website: moorestown-mall.com

Moorestown Mall is a shopping mall in Moorestown, New Jersey, owned by PREIT. The mall has over 90 stores and is anchored by Boscov's, Regal Cinemas, and Cooper University Health Care - Moorestown Campus. Junior anchors are Five Below, HomeSense, Michaels, and Sierra Trading Post, all located in a converted Macy's anchor store. There is one anchor tenant called Parky’s, a family entertainment center, under construction at the mall.

== History ==
Moorestown Mall originally opened for business in 1963 with Gimbels, Wanamaker's, and Woolworths as the original anchors. In 1971, Sears built a new store and relocated from Camden, NJ. Gimbels became Stern's in 1986 and closed in 1990. It later became Ports of the World, a new concept by Boscov's only to be converted to Boscov's not long after. Moorestown Mall underwent a partial renovation in 1986 and was completely renovated in 1993–94, after a serious fire damaged the northeast quarter of the mall on December 23, 1992. Wanamaker's became Hecht's in 1995 and was later converted to Strawbridge's. Prior to The Rouse Company's purchase of the center in December 1997, Lord & Taylor had committed to opening a store at the mall. Nordstrom also considered opening a location in South Jersey but they did not commit to the mall's expansion plans. The Strawbridge's store was rebuilt in 1999.

In an attempt to protect the Cherry Hill Mall, a mere 3 miles (4.8 km) away, The Rouse Company acquired the Moorestown Mall. On March 7, 2003, PREIT acquired the Cherry Hill Mall, Echelon Mall, Moorestown Mall, Exton Square, Plymouth Meeting Mall, and Gallery at Market East in exchange for Christiana Mall. Strawbridge's became Macy's in 2006.

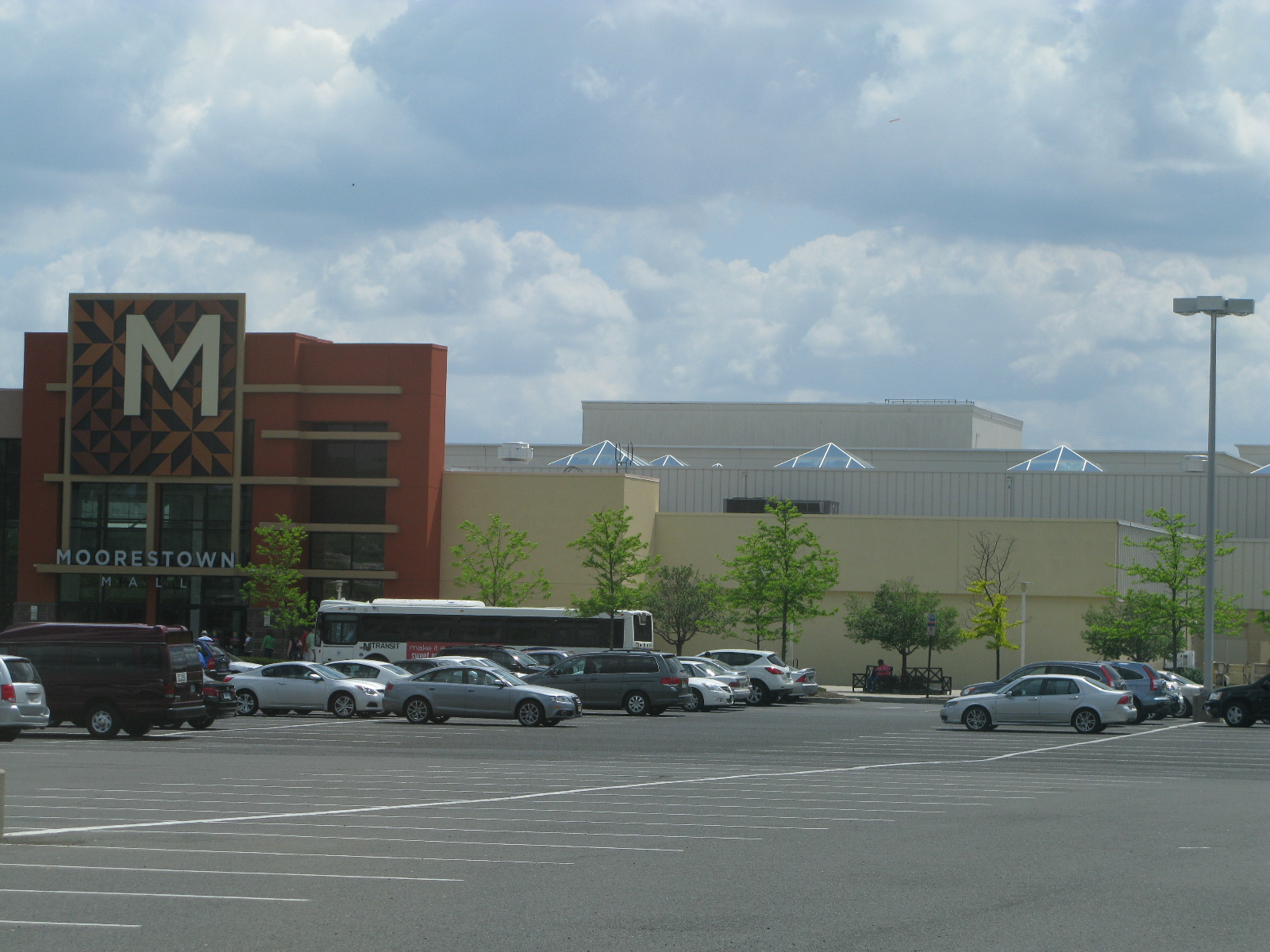
Moorestown Mall in 2012

In 2011, Moorestown residents voted to allow liquor sales at the Moorestown Mall in order to increase revenues at the mall. As a result, several upscale, polished casual restaurants have been opened, highlighted by the Philadelphia region's first Yard House sports-bar restaurant and Distrito, a restaurant from the Garces Group.

On December 22, 2011, PREIT and the Regal Entertainment Group announced their intent to build a new state-of-the-art 56,000 sq ft 12-screen theater known as Regal Moorestown Mall Stadium 12, which will feature the new Regal Premium Experience (RPX). The theater took over the 7-screen United Artists Theaters at the mall, while a formerly adjacent skate park was used as an expansion to the new theater which more than doubled the size of the current theater. Additionally, the development marked the first RPX theater in the market, which features digital projectors, surround sound, 2D and RealD 3D, stadium seating with high-back rocking recliner seats, and Regal Express kiosks for automated ticket purchasing. Although opened with standard theater seats, all screens were renovated less than two years later to include full power reclining seats on all screens. The RPX theater features the same new seating with the addition of tactile sound technology from ButtKicker.

In 2015, the mall's food court was redeveloped and upgraded to provide an enhanced environment that better matches the merchandising mix and upscale demographics.

In recent years, the Moorestown Mall has seen an increase in the vacancy rate, due to declining mall traffic and competition from the larger Cherry Hill Mall located less than 4 miles (6.4 km) away. In 2019, the non-anchor occupancy rate at Moorestown Mall is 82.4%.

On January 4, 2017, Macy's announced that its store would be closing as part of a plan to close 68 stores nationwide. The store closed in March 2017. On February 8, 2018, it was announced that HomeSense, and Sierra Trading Post would be opening in the former Macy's space. HomeSense opened in September 2018, Five Below opening in Winter of 2018 and Sierra Trading Post opening in Winter/Spring 2019.

On August 28, 2019, Lord & Taylor announced that it would also be closing in 2020.

On February 4, 2020, Sears announced they would be closing on April 11, 2020 as part of a plan to close 31 stores nationwide leaving Boscov's as the mall's only traditional anchor.

On October 15, 2020, Planet Fitness opened a location at the Moorestown Mall.

In 2022, it was announced that PREIT, the mall’s owner, gained approval to build 375 apartments on the property with a 125-room hotel in the works. The number of apartments could reach 1,065 units.

Turn 7 Liquidators opened in the former Lord & Taylor space in 2022. The store closed in 2024 and is expected to be replaced by Parky’s, an entertainment center. The center will feature amenities such as mini-golf, an arcade, and a go-kart track. As of 2026, Parky’s is under construction.

Cooper University Health Care converted the former Sears store to an ambulatory care facility, the Cooper University Health Care – Moorestown Campus, which opened in November 2023.
