= Cherry Hill Mall, New Jersey =

Populated place in Camden County, New Jersey, US

- Census-designated place
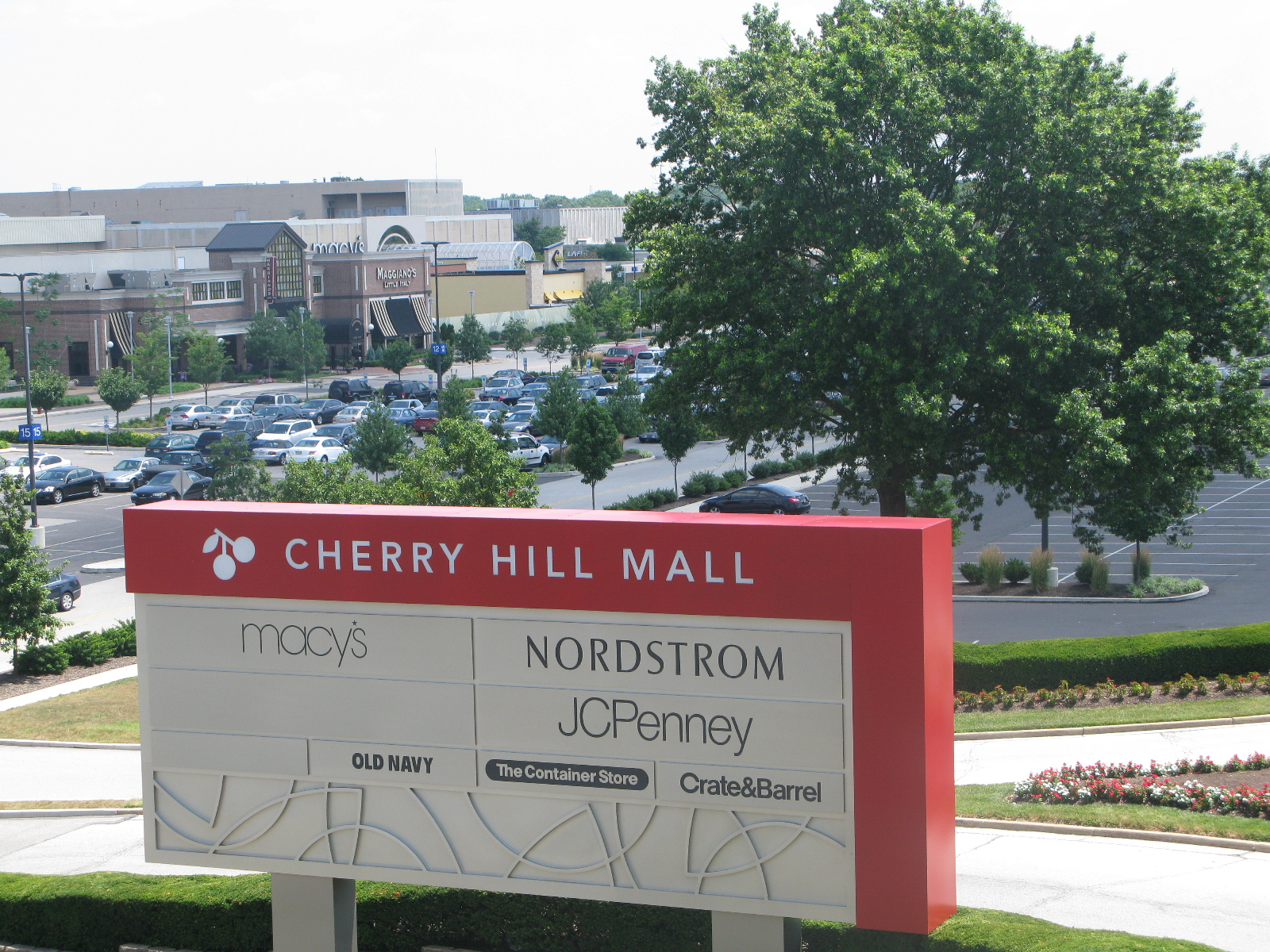
- The namesake Cherry Hill Mall shopping complex within the census-designated place

- Map of Cherry Hill Mall CDP in Camden County. Inset: Location of Camden County in New Jersey.

- Location in Camden County Location in New Jersey Location in the United States
- Coordinates: 39.938885°N 75.011805°W
- Country: United States
- State: New Jersey
- County: Camden
- Township: Cherry Hill

Area
  - Total: 3.646 sq mi (9.443 km^{2})
  - Land: 3.642 sq mi (9.433 km^{2})
  - Water: 0.0039 sq mi (0.010 km^{2}) 0.10%
- Elevation: 36 ft (11 m)

Population (2020)
  - Total: 14,805
  - Density: 4,059.5/sq mi (1,567.4/km^{2})
- Time zone: UTC−05:00 (Eastern (EST))
  - Summer (DST): UTC−04:00 (EDT)
- Area code: 856
- FIPS code: 3412385
- GNIS feature ID: 02389309

Cherry Hill Mall is an unincorporated community and census-designated place (CDP) located in Cherry Hill, in Camden County, in the U.S. state of New Jersey. As of the 2020 United States census, the CDP's population was 14,805, its highest decennial count ever and an increase of 634 (+4.5%) from the 14,171 residents recorded at the 2010 census count, which in turn reflected an increase of 933 (+7.0%) from the 13,238 counted in the 2000 census. The CDP is home to the namesake Cherry Hill Mall shopping complex.

== Geography ==
According to the United States Census Bureau, Cherry Hill Mall had a total area of 3.646 square miles (9.44 km^{2}), including 3.642 square miles (9.43 km^{2}) of it is land and 0.004 square miles (0.010 km^{2}) of water (0.10%).

== Demographics ==
Historical population
Census	Pop.	Note	%±
2000	13,238		—
2010	14,171		7.0%
2020	14,805		4.5%
Sources: 2000; 2010 2020

Cherry Hill Mall first appeared as a census designated place in the 2000 U.S. census created from part of the deleted Cherry Hill CDP.

=== Racial and ethnic composition ===
Cherry Hill Mall CDP, New Jersey – Racial and ethnic composition Note: the US Census treats Hispanic/Latino as an ethnic category. This table excludes Latinos from the racial categories and assigns them to a separate category. Hispanics/Latinos may be of any race.
Race / Ethnicity (NH = Non-Hispanic)	Pop 2000	Pop 2010	Pop 2020	% 2000	% 2010	% 2020
White alone (NH)	10,789	9,972	9,012	81.50%	70.37%	60.87%
Black or African American alone (NH)	655	1,039	1,341	4.95%	7.33%	9.06%
Native American or Alaska Native alone (NH)	5	13	13	0.04%	0.09%	0.09%
Asian alone (NH)	1,191	1,822	2,103	9.00%	12.86%	14.20%
Native Hawaiian or Pacific Islander alone (NH)	10	1	5	0.08%	0.01%	0.03%
Other race alone (NH)	14	16	101	0.11%	0.11%	0.68%
Mixed race or Multiracial (NH)	175	294	550	1.32%	2.07%	3.71%
Hispanic or Latino (any race)	399	1,014	1,680	3.01%	7.16%	11.35%
Total	13,238	14,171	14,805	100.00%	100.00%	100.00%

=== 2020 census ===
As of the 2020 census, Cherry Hill Mall had a population of 14,805. The median age was 40.6 years. 21.7% of residents were under the age of 18 and 18.0% of residents were 65 years of age or older. For every 100 females there were 94.1 males, and for every 100 females age 18 and over there were 90.8 males age 18 and over.

100.0% of residents lived in urban areas, while 0.0% lived in rural areas.

There were 5,647 households in Cherry Hill Mall, of which 29.8% had children under the age of 18 living in them. Of all households, 51.2% were married-couple households, 15.8% were households with a male householder and no spouse or partner present, and 27.1% were households with a female householder and no spouse or partner present. About 26.8% of all households were made up of individuals and 12.5% had someone living alone who was 65 years of age or older.

There were 6,016 housing units, of which 6.1% were vacant. The homeowner vacancy rate was 1.3% and the rental vacancy rate was 9.7%.

=== 2010 census ===
The 2010 United States census counted 14,171 people, 5,563 households, and 3,749 families in the CDP. The population density was 3,890.7 people per square mile (1,502.2 people/km^{2}). There were 5,941 housing units at an average density of 1,631.1 units per square mile (629.8 units/km^{2}). The racial makeup was 74.20% (10,515) White, 7.69% (1,090) Black or African American, 0.16% (22) Native American, 12.93% (1,832) Asian, 0.01% (2) Pacific Islander, 2.26% (320) from other races, and 2.75% (390) from two or more races. Hispanic or Latino of any race were 7.16% (1,014) of the population.

Of the 5,563 households, 28.3% had children under the age of 18; 52.8% were married couples living together; 10.8% had a female householder with no husband present and 32.6% were non-families. Of all households, 26.9% were made up of individuals and 11.4% had someone living alone who was 65 years of age or older. The average household size was 2.52 and the average family size was 3.11.

21.7% of the population were under the age of 18, 7.5% from 18 to 24, 26.0% from 25 to 44, 28.1% from 45 to 64, and 16.6% who were 65 years of age or older. The median age was 41.1 years. For every 100 females, the population had 90.6 males. For every 100 females ages 18 and older there were 87.2 males.

=== 2000 census ===
As of the 2000 United States census there were 13,238 people, 5,062 households, and 3,649 families residing in Cherry Hill Mall. The population density was 1,381.4 people/km^{2} (3,578 people/mi^{2}). There were 5,219 housing units at an average density of 544.6 units/km^{2} (1,411 units/mi^{2}). The racial makeup of the CDP was 83.15% White, 5.05% African American, 0.05% Native American, 9.03% Asian, 0.08% Pacific Islander, 1.10% from other races, and 1.54% from two or more races. Hispanic or Latino of any race were 3.01% of the population.

There were 5,062 households, out of which 29.6% had children under the age of 18 living with them, 59.3% were married couples living together, 9.6% had a female householder with no husband present, and 27.9% were non-families. 24.0% of all households were made up of individuals, and 12.5% had someone living alone who was 65 years of age or older. The average household size was 2.56 and the average family size was 3.05.

In Cherry Hill Mall the population was spread out, with 22.5% under the age of 18, 5.5% from 18 to 24, 26.1% from 25 to 44, 25.4% from 45 to 64, and 20.5% who were 65 years of age or older. The median age was 42 years. For every 100 females there were 89.1 males. For every 100 females age 18 and over, there were 85.6 males.

The median income for a household in Cherry Hill Mall was $61,620, and the median income for a family was $69,441. Males had a median income of $51,118 versus $34,355 for females. The per capita income for Cherry Hill Mall was $28,892. About 3.6% of families and 4.8% of the population were below the poverty line, including 5.9% of those under age 18 and 3.9% of those age 65 or over.

== The District ==
The District is a commercially oriented neighborhood within Cherry Hill Township comprising a high concentration of retail and dining entities, containing the Cherry Hill Mall CDP and adjacent commercial plazas, hotels, big box stores, dining amenities, and a large regional strip mall at the intersection of Route 70 and Haddonfield Road (County Route 644). The District is located in the vicinity of Route 38, Haddonfield Road, and Route 70, situated within 20 minutes of Center City, Philadelphia and Camden, New Jersey.
