= Cherry Hill Mall =

Shopping mall in Camden County, New Jersey, U.S.

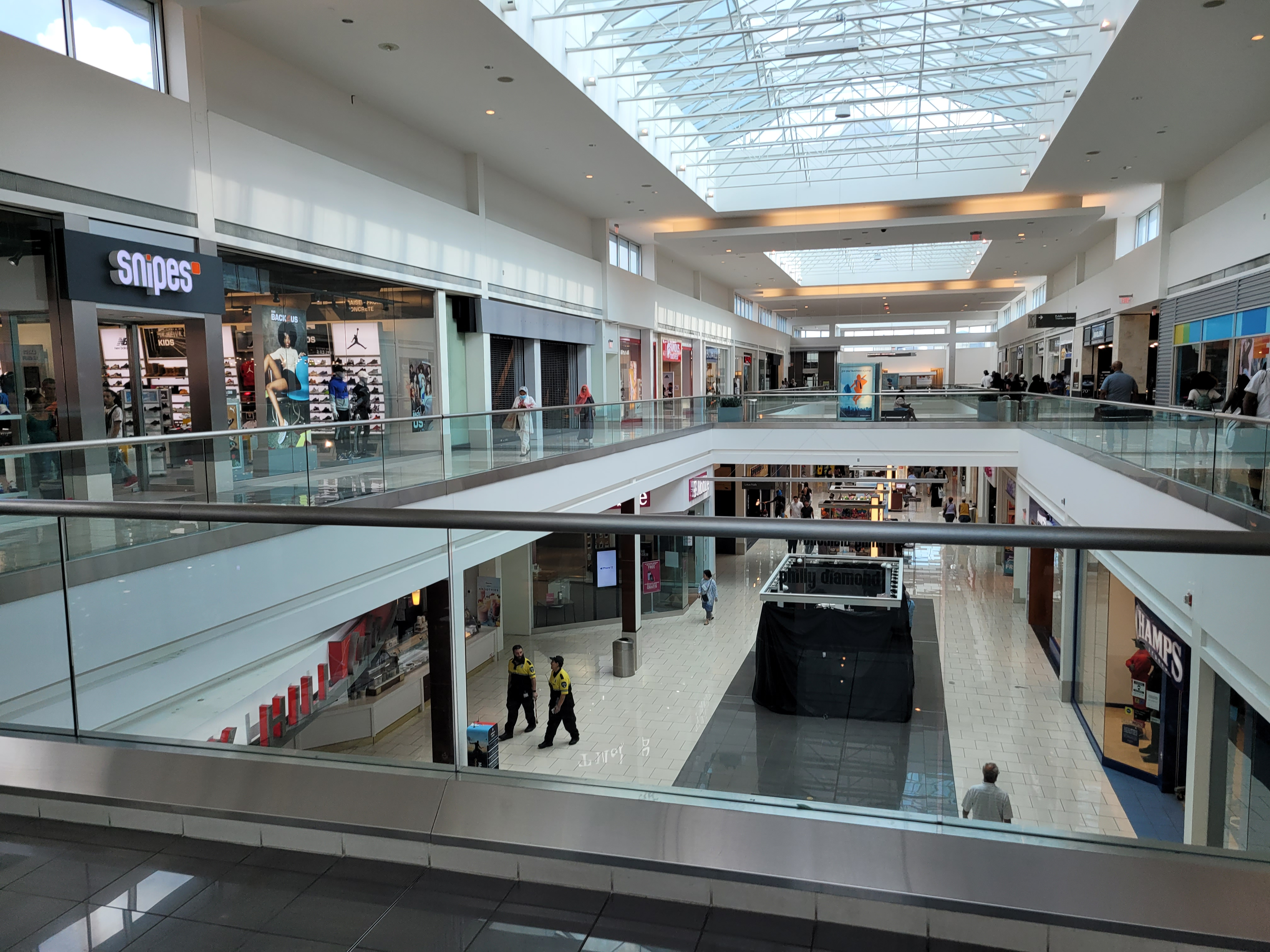
- Interior view (August 2021)
- Location: Cherry Hill, New Jersey, United States
- Coordinates: 39.941°N 75.025°W
- Opened: October 11, 1961; 65 years ago
- Renovated: 1978, 1985 (food court), 1990, 2009
- Developer: Community Research & Development, Inc.
- Manager: PREIT Realty
- Owner: PREIT Realty
- Architect: Victor Gruen Associates
- Num. of stores: 180
- Num. of anchor tenants: 4
- Floor area: 1,306,000 square feet (121,300 m^{2})
- Floors: 2 (1 in original sections, 3 in Macy's)
- Parking: Parking lot, parking garage, valet parking
- Public transit: NJ Transit Bus: 404, 405, 413, 418, 450, 455; FlixBus; Greyhound Lines
- Website: www.cherryhillmall.com

The Cherry Hill Mall is a super-regional shopping mall in Cherry Hill, New Jersey. The mall is within the unincorporated namesake neighborhood and census-designated place of Cherry Hill Mall.

The mall was developed by James Rouse, working in partnership with Strawbridge and Clothier. Designed by architect Victor Gruen, the Cherry Hill Mall opened in 1961 as one of the first enclosed malls in the United States. PREIT acquired the mall in 2003.

== Location ==
The Cherry Hill Mall is located at the interchange of Route 38 and Haddonfield Road. It is located three miles (4.8 km) west of the Moorestown Mall on Route 38.

== Description ==
Anchored by Macy's, Nordstrom, JCPenney, and Dick’s House of Sport, the Cherry Hill Mall is an L-shaped enclosed mall with a gross leasable area of 1,306,000 square feet (121,300 m^{2}). The original portion of the mall is on a single level. Later wings, opened in 1978 and 2009, are two-level. Macy's is the mall's largest anchor, with three floors and 304,600 square feet (28,300 m^{2}) of retail area. The 174,285-square-foot (16,191.6 m^{2}) JCPenney, the 138,000-square-foot (12,800 m^{2}) Nordstrom, and the 120,000-square-foot (11,000 m^{2}) Dick’s House of Sport contain two floors. The mall includes a row of exterior-facing casual dining restaurants, as well as a 10-unit food court. The Container Store and Crate & Barrel occupy freestanding pad sites on the property and serve as junior anchors.

== History ==
=== Initial plans ===
Cherry Hill Mall between JCPenney and Nordstrom

In December 1953, New Jersey developer Eugene Mori announced plans to build a $15 million shopping center, to be called Cherry Hill, on an 80-acre (32 ha) tract of land in Delaware Township. Mori, who had already built the Garden State Racetrack nearby, was also in the process of building a hotel called the Cherry Hill Inn on a different portion of the site. The mall would occupy the former site of the 16-acre (6.5 ha) George Jaus farm. The "Cherry Hill" name came from another farm that once operated in the area, with the name first appearing on a property deed from 1838.

Strawbridge & Clothier, a Philadelphia-based department store chain, signed onto the project in January of 1955 as the center's primary anchor tenant. Strawbridge had been seeking a New Jersey location to expand their presence in the Delaware Valley, and the selection of Cherry Hill was the result of a two-year search. The Cherry Hill site would also include 50 smaller shops, making it one of the largest shopping centers of its era. With the signing of Strawbridge, Mori claimed that construction on the center could begin imminently. In November of 1956, the Cherry Hill project signed its second tenant, a Food Fair supermarket. At that point, the developers said the shopping center would open in September of 1958, with 800,000 square feet (74,000 m^{2}) of retail space.

In January 1957, the project's developers wrote an op-ed for the Courier-Post stating that the center was over two-thirds leased. They said significant progress had been made, writing "Although no shovels have moved any earth as yet, the past year has seen the completion of utility plans, traffic patterns, and working drawings...". By the summer of 1958, however, there were still no signs of construction, and rumors of the project's demise were spreading.

Behind the scenes, Mori was struggling to find sources of financing for the project. Financial institutions were skeptical of the location's market potential. Analysts believed the proposed shopping center was too far from Camden, the nearest city.

In August 1958, Strawbridge and Clothier signed a purchase agreement to take over the project from Mori.

=== James Rouse and Victor Gruen take control ===
On March 12, 1960, new plans for the Cherry Hill Shopping Center were unveiled. Strawbridge and Clothier would partner with James Rouse and his firm, Community Research and Development (a subsidiary of The Rouse Company and Connecticut General), to build the center. Instead of the previous plan's open-air concept, Cherry Hill would instead be constructed as a fully enclosed mall. The Courier-Post explained that the mall would be "extensively landscaped in a tropical plant motif", featuring benches and a sidewalk cafe to create "an atmosphere comparable to the European shopping arcade."

Rouse had already built two enclosed malls: the Harundale Mall in Glen Burnie, Maryland, which opened in 1958, and the Charlottetown Mall in Charlotte, North Carolina, which opened in 1959. Both malls were less than half the size of his proposed New Jersey mall. According to Rouse biographer Joshua Olsen, this new project at Cherry Hill "would secure his reputation as a developer and prove to everyone in America that enclosed malls were here to stay."

Rouse hired architect Victor Gruen for the task of designing the Cherry Hill Mall. Gruen had previously designed America's first fully enclosed, climate-controlled mall, Minnesota's Southdale Center, which had opened in 1956.

=== Construction ===
Strawbridge & Clothier held a groundbreaking ceremony for their Cherry Hill store on September 21, 1960.

Construction on the mall itself began in November 1960. The mall's first phase of construction would cost $30 million, totaling 600,000 square feet (56,000 m^{2}) and 75 stores, with opening targeted for the fall of 1961. The project involved 700 construction workers and tradesmen.

During a press event held on August 8, 1961, Rouse said Cherry Hill would be "the finest enclosed mall in the country, because here we have been able to incorporate all the improvements, and eliminate some mistakes we have made in previous shopping centers."

=== Architecture and design ===
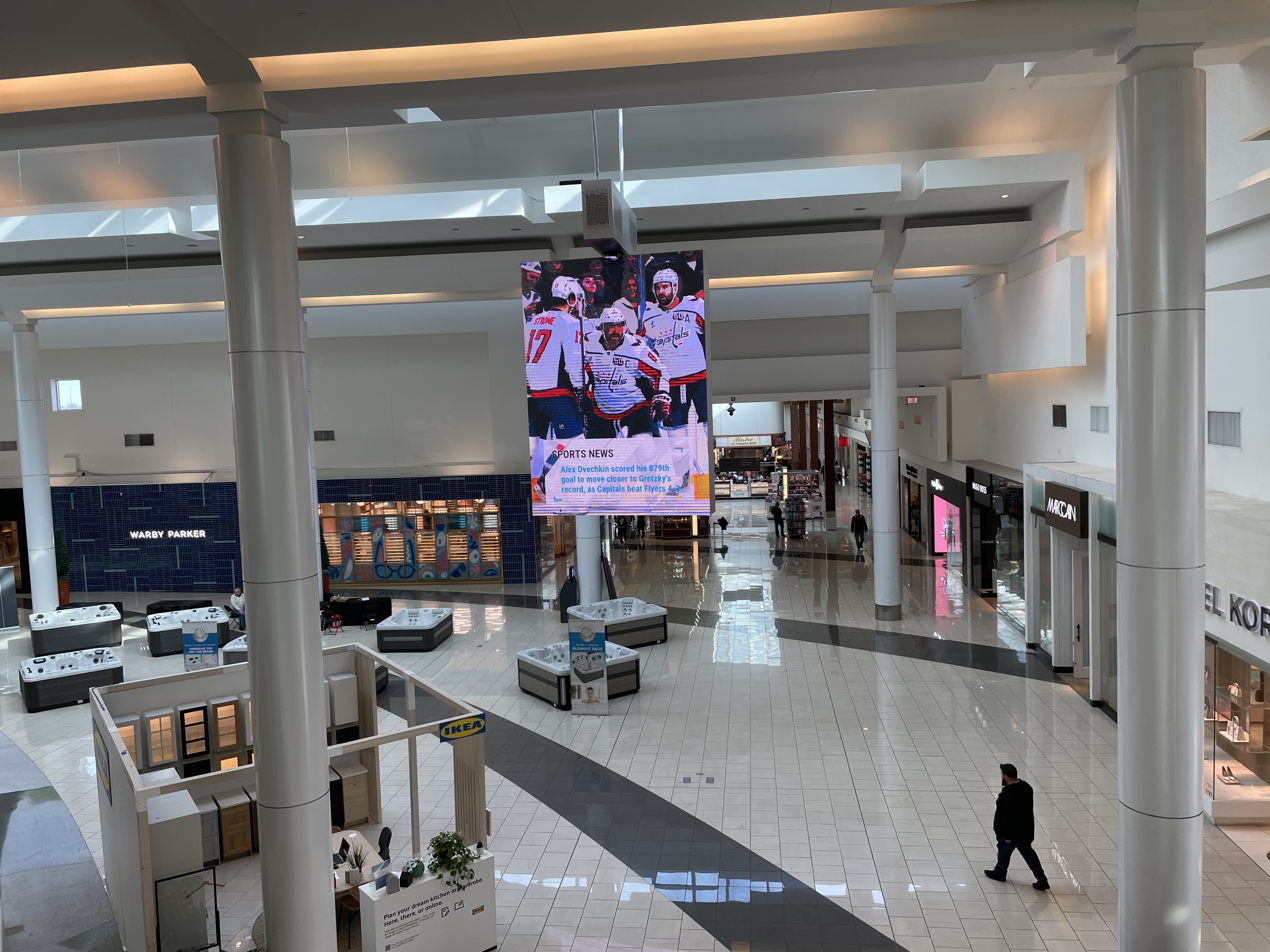
Grand court at Cherry Hill Mall

The mall's exterior was simple, described by the Courier-Post as an "elegant structure of white brick, with accents of fieldstone and decorative metal siding." For shopping centers, Gruen believed in a concept he called "introverted architecture", whereby the building's exterior was kept understated and reserved. Delivery areas were screened with walls and landscaping, while Strawbridge & Clothier had its own underground tunnel for deliveries.

Gruen's work primarily focused on the mall's interior spaces. The centerpiece of the building was the Cherry Court, which featured a 50-foot (15 m) tall arched ceiling, along with trees, flowers, and a "huge fountain" with "many changing spouts." Years later, Rouse would reflect on the success of the mall's design, writing to Gruen, "There is no space we have produced that is as grand and floating as Cherry Court."

Two separate wings, or "malls", branched out from the Cherry Court. The Delaware Mall was home to a movie theater, a community meeting room, and a sidewalk cafe. The Penn Mall was anchored by the Market Court, which was designed to resemble an international bazaar or European market square. Rouse loved small, independent shops, and he believed that filling a court with shops selling unique foreign goods would draw traffic to that end of the mall.

Flooring in the mall was a mix of "quarry tile, terrazzo, scored concrete and colored concrete in a variety of patterns." Artificial lighting was supplemented with skylights and clerestory windows.

Gruen had originally intended the indoor landscaping to be a subtle design, but Rouse went a different direction. Landscape architect Lewis J. Clarke was brought in to design the mall's indoor gardens. One of his additions to the mall was the Birdcage Garden, an aviary of tropical birds. A 21-foot (6.4 m) tall enclosure housed finches, toucans, and myna birds. The area around the aviary featured banana trees and a flowing stream. Other features included a waterfall, wooden bridge, and gazebo. The mall contained a total of 14,000 living trees and plants, and employed two full-time gardeners.

=== Design philosophy ===
Developer James Rouse and architect Victor Gruen both had "theorized extensively about the social effects of urban design" and had strong feelings about the ways shopping centers could transform suburban life. The Cherry Hill Mall would serve as a real-world laboratory to test those theories.

Rouse believed that a mall should "serve the community so that it becomes central to the community, that the community adopts it as its center and develops deep feelings of pride and enthusiasm and concern about it, and inevitably, therefore, shops there. The shortest route to achieving relative invulnerability [...] is to build a center of such quality and such importance to the community that it doesn't become readily assailable".

A key part of this strategy involved adding a community meeting room to the Cherry Hill Mall. This facility, which consisted of a 400-seat main hall, a separate 90-seat meeting room, and a full kitchen, could be rented for a nominal cost by churches and other non-profit organizations.

Gruen believed that suburbs lacked a sense of community. He thought enclosed malls could solve that problem by creating a "town square" for those areas lacking a traditional downtown. For Gruen, enclosing shopping centers was an important step, as it allowed them "to overcome the 'vulgarity' of sprawling highway strips" and made them more useful as community spaces. According to a Courier-Post article, Gruen wanted people to feel like they were shopping on an outdoor street, while offering "welcome relief from the noise, dirt and cars which spoil many shopping streets."

=== Grand opening ===
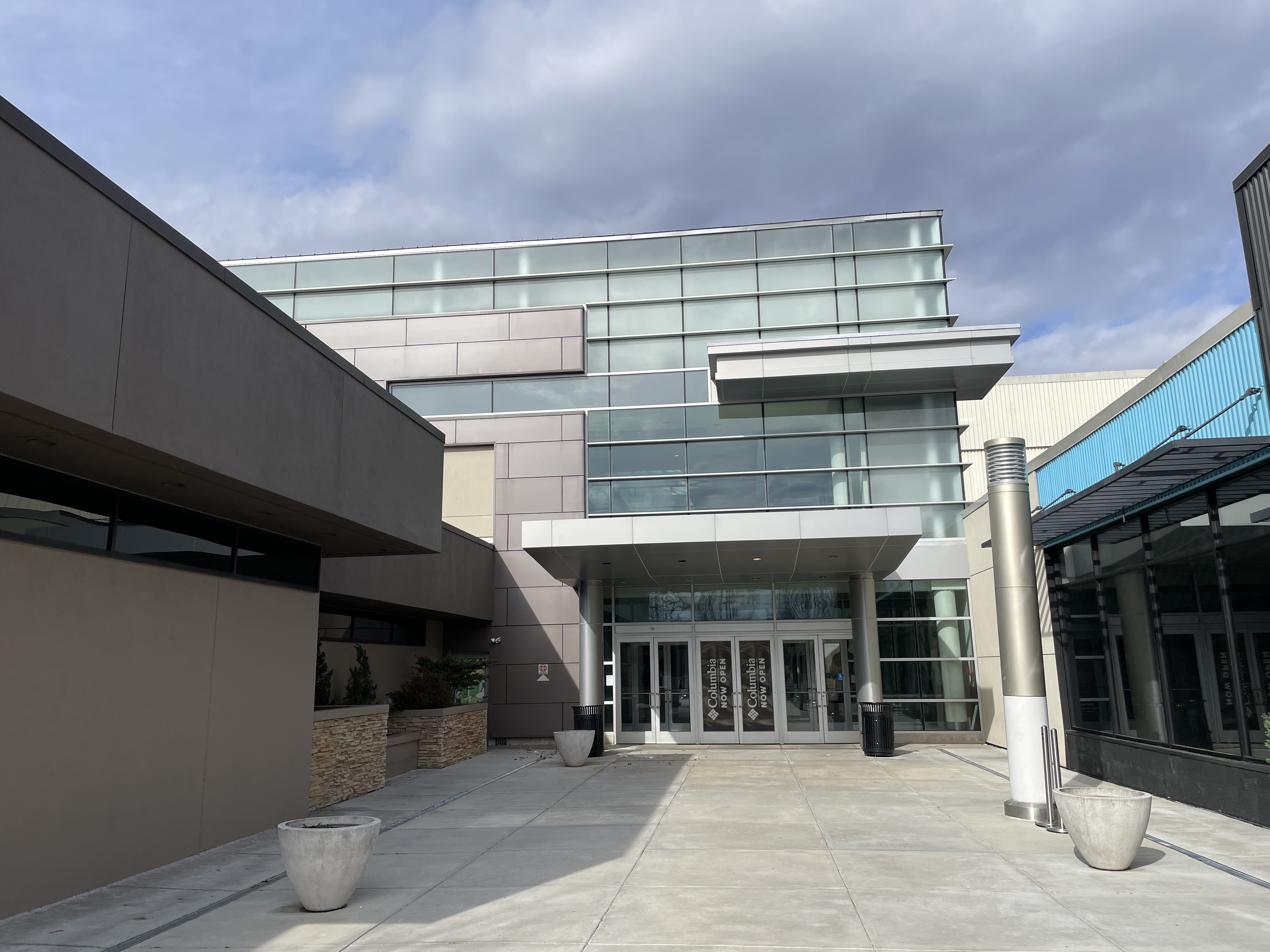
Entrance to Cherry Hill Mall

The Cherry Hill Mall officially opened to the public on October 11, 1961, "with pomp and ceremony and under the most auspicious circumstances", according to a newspaper report in the Courier-Post. The writer reported: "Every expectation was fulfilled. The crowds that swarmed into and through the center during the day and evening were amazed and delighted at what they saw [...] There is no doubt that Cherry Hill Center is and will be a success from its first day of operation."

Approximately 3,500 people attended the mall's opening ceremony, which included a speech from New Jersey's then-governor, Robert Meyner. In total, a crowd of 25,000 people visited the mall on its first day.

At its opening, the Cherry Hill Mall was believed to be the largest enclosed mall in the eastern US, and one of only eight enclosed malls in the United States. The mall's opening drew significant national attention, covered by Reader's Digest, The Wall Street Journal, and the New York Times Magazine.

=== Strawbridge & Clothier ===
The Strawbridge & Clothier location at Cherry Hill would be the chain's fourth and largest branch location, with the three-story building covering four acres (1.6 ha) of land.

The 215,000-square-foot (20,000 m^{2}) store opened onto the Cherry Court, with a second-floor restaurant terrace and a main entrance that was more than 65 feet (20 m) long. A staircase led from Cherry Court directly to the restaurant, which specialized in Italian cuisine.

The Cherry Hill store was an immediate success and became Strawbridge's most profitable branch location.

=== Junior anchors ===
While Strawbridge & Clothier opened as the mall's only full-line department store, Cherry Hill initially contained three other large retailers.

One of the mall's largest tenants was a 60,000-square-foot (5,600 m^{2}) Woolworth's, which had its own exterior entrance. At its opening, it was the largest single-story Woolworth's store in the country. Woolworth's also operated two of the mall's early dining options: In addition to a standard Woolworth's Harvest House Cafeteria, the Cherry Hill location also featured a diner-style restaurant in the middle of the mall corridor, called the Cherry Hill Grill. Waitresses worked on a sunken floor, allowing them to be at eye level with their customers, who were seated at swivel stools.

S.S. Kresge, a variety store chain similar to Woolworth's—and the predecessor of Kmart—was another prominent tenant during the mall's early years.

Also opening with the mall was a 28,000-square-foot (2,600 m^{2}) Food Fair supermarket.

=== Entertainment venues ===
A single-screen movie theater opened at the mall in March 1962. Occupying 20,300 square feet (1,890 m^{2}), the theater held a total capacity of 1,600 guests. Simply called the Cherry Hill Cinema, the theater was located in the Delaware wing. In 1970, the theater was divided into two screens. It remained a twin-screen theater until its eventual closure in 1987.

Two attractions for children operated at the mall during portions of the 1960s and '70s.

Wonderworld debuted in the fall of 1963. Described as "a fantasy in sight, sound and motion", Wonderworld was a 3,000-square-foot (280 m^{2}) walk-through castle, filled with animated scenes and animatronic figures. The scenes and figures changed seasonally, with offerings including "Jolly Jungle Safari", "Three-Ring Circus", and "The North Pole". Although 50,000 people visited Wonderworld in its first two months, the attraction proved to be short-lived.

Kiddieland, a small indoor amusement park, also opened at the mall in 1963. Located in a 14,000-square-foot (1,300 m^{2}) space opposite the Food Fair supermarket, attractions included a boat ride, a merry-go-round, a haunted house, bowling and more. Owner Bill Kehoe operated several other Kiddielands, but the Cherry Hill location was the first to open in an enclosed mall. Kiddieland also specialized in hosting birthday parties. It closed in the early 1970s.

=== Bamberger's addition ===
Strawbridge was initially reluctant to have a competing department store at Cherry Hill. Rouse, however, believed that two competing department stores were essential to a shopping center's long-term success. Eventually Strawbridge agreed, but the mall was already under construction, ensuring that only Strawbridge & Clothier would be ready by opening day.

On March 17, 1961, Bamberger's announced it would open a store at the Cherry Hill Mall, becoming the mall's second full-line department store. Bamberger's, a subsidiary of R.H. Macy & Co., had seven existing stores in northern New Jersey, but this would mark the chain's first location in South Jersey. The 210,000-square-foot (20,000 m^{2}) store would open in the fall of 1962, one year after the rest of the mall. Construction of the three-story structure was expected to cost $12 million. Bamberger's would sit at the end of the L-shaped mall's east-west wing, with Strawbridge's occupying the space at the angle.

An extension of the Delaware wing connected Bamberger's with the existing mall. This extension housed approximately 20 stores in 58,000 square feet (5,400 m^{2}) of new retail space. In front of Bamberger's, a new court was constructed, designed to match the beauty of the existing Cherry Court. Called the "Court of the Islands", this area consisted of several plant islands connected by wooden bridges. Water features included two water curtains, 35 fountain jets, and 12 waterfalls.

The Bamberger's cornerstone was placed on September 18, 1962, marking the completion of construction. The store held its grand opening on September 26, 1962. Bamberger's officially opened after a brief ceremony in the Court of the Islands, where a large button was pressed to start the fountains and waterfalls.

The Bamberger's building was described as a "modern design with white and green glazed brick and large extended windows on the exterior." Designed by the firm of Copeland, Novak and Israel, the store's design featured a 100-foot (30 m) long, all-glass space attached to the main building. The Garden State Restaurant operated on the store's upper level, with a wall of glass windows overlooking the mall. The restaurant was given a country motif, with wood planks and chandeliers made of wood and leaded glass.

At the completion of the Bamberger's addition, the Cherry Hill Mall was believed to be the largest shopping mall in the United States.

=== Office building addition: "One Cherry Hill" ===
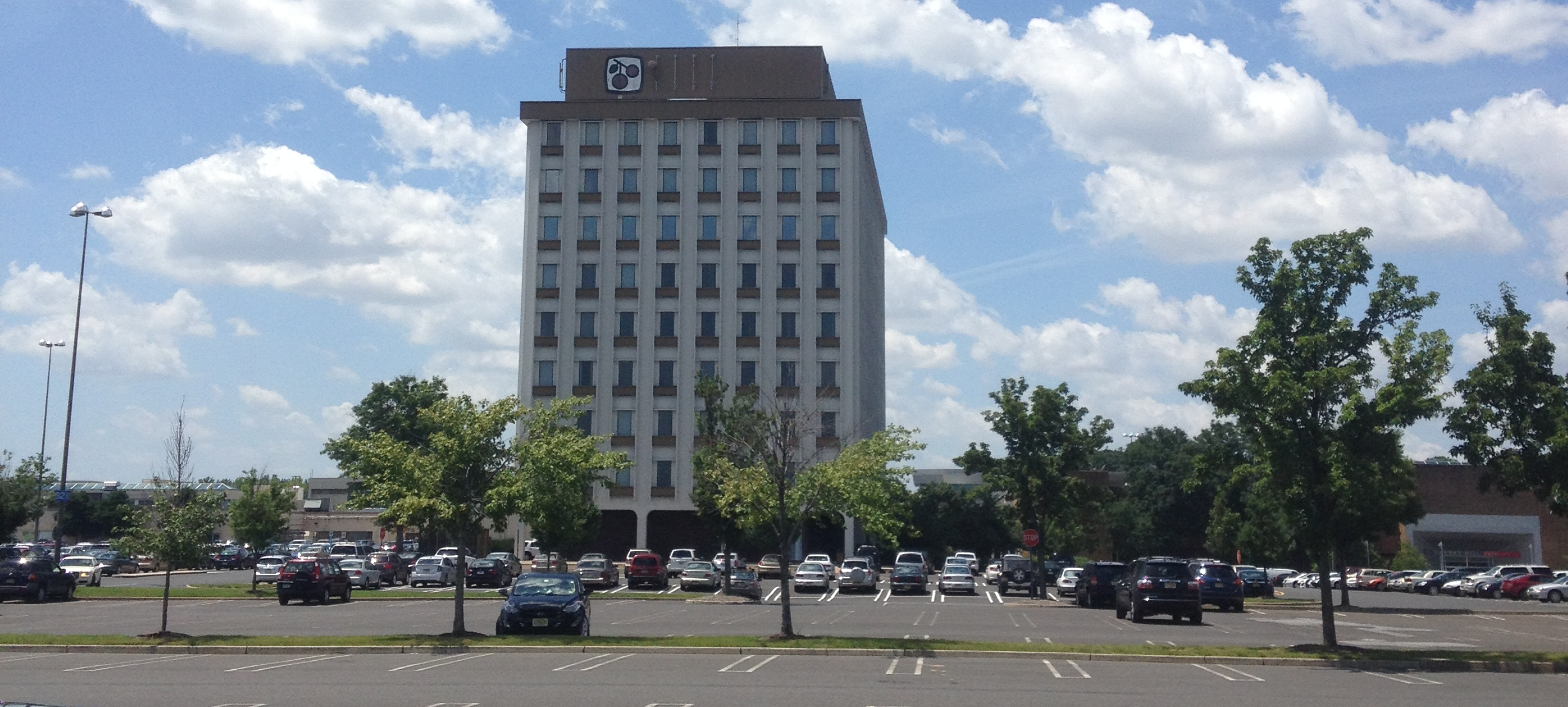
The One Cherry Hill office building adjacent to the mall (demolished in 2025)

In 1966, The Rouse Company announced it would construct a nine-story, 100,000-square-foot (9,300 m^{2}) office building next to the mall. The project took a leap forward in September 1967, when the Connecticut General Life Insurance Co., which already owned the land under the mall, agreed to finance the office tower addition.

The building officially opened on October 29, 1968, with 52 tenants and 65% of its office space leased. The lobby contained 11 retail spaces, primarily catering to the office workers above, but also open to the public. These businesses included a coffee shop, a tobacco shop, a copy center, and a barbershop.

=== JCPenney wing addition and first mall renovation ===
On November 12, 1973, officials from the Rouse Company held a press conference to announce a major expansion project for the Cherry Hill Mall. The company planned to spend $25 million to add a new wing with a JCPenney department store, 65 smaller shops, and a food court called Gourmet Fair. The plan also called for the creation of an outdoor "town center" adjacent to the mall, to include apartment buildings, office buildings, and a hotel. A landscaped park—complete with squash courts and a 500-seat amphitheater—was also included in the proposal.

The project was delayed and scaled back due to the 1973–1975 recession, as well as changes requested by the local planning board.

By 1976, Rouse was ready to move forward with a more modest proposal to add a new mall wing and third department store. Plans were approved in June of 1976 for a two-story, 150,000-square-foot (14,000 m^{2}) mall addition and a 180,000-square-foot (17,000 m^{2}) JCPenney store. The new wing would cost $15 million and house up to 70 smaller shops. A groundbreaking ceremony for the new addition was held on November 16, 1976.

The new mall wing opened on March 2, 1978 with 64 new stores, but with JCPenney still under construction. Designed by the firm of Caudill, Rowlett & Scott, the addition featured an area called "Cherry Fair", with smaller shops selling artisanal goods. It also added several restaurants to the mall, including Chick-fil-A, Sbarro, and McDonald's.

Alongside construction of the new wing, The Rouse Company undertook a multimillion-dollar renovation of the existing mall, bringing the mall's design into the 1970s. Changes included new skylights, wooden slat ceilings, and new floor tile throughout the mall.

JCPenney opened on January 3, 1979 as the chain's 16th New Jersey location, and their 8th store in the Philadelphia market. The store included a beauty salon and a restaurant.

=== Food Court addition ===
When the Cherry Hill Mall was built in 1961, the concept of a food court hadn't yet been invented. James Rouse was inspired to create the first mall food court after a visit to a Los Angeles farmers market. His first attempt, at Pennsylvania's Plymouth Meeting Mall, opened in 1971, but was widely viewed as a failure. He continued to experiment with food courts at other malls, finally perfecting the formula at Toronto's Sherway Gardens in 1971, and New Jersey's Paramus Park Mall in 1974.

By the 1980s, food courts had become standard in new malls. The rival Moorestown Mall opened a food court in 1984, and it soon became clear that the Cherry Hill Mall would need its own food court to stay competitive.

Construction on a 16-eatery, $5 million food court began in February 1985. The food court contained 8,900 square feet (830 m^{2}) of leasable space, as well as seating for 600. Mall management relocated several existing businesses to make room for the project, which was located in the mall's north wing. A new fountain, with a built-in stage, was installed under a domed glass roof at the center of the seating area.

The food court, officially named Picnic at Cherry Hill, opened on September 19, 1985. To foster an upscale ambiance, fresh flowers were placed on each table, and a pianist was hired to play live music on the center stage. A reviewer for the Philadelphia Daily News wrote, "This is the cleanest picnic you'll ever see, thanks to a fleet of energetic young people who sweep crumbs, clear tables, wipe spills and stash litter."

=== The 1980s ===
On October 5, 1986, the Bamberger's store officially became Macy's, as part of a larger project to convert all of the company's stores to the Macy's brand.

The mall's movie theater permanently closed on February 28, 1987. As a twin-screen cinema, it couldn't compete with larger multiplexes and wasn't able to expand.

=== 1990 mall renovation ===
In advance of the mall's 30th anniversary, the Rouse Company undertook a $16 million renovation project in 1990. Designed by the architectural firm of Dagit Saylor, the renovations changed the mall's color scheme and added new light fixtures, neon accents, and additional skylights. Concrete planters were added throughout the mall. Over $2 million was spent on imported marble flooring, and landscaping was simplified using tall palm trees.

The biggest changes were reserved for the Cherry Court. The existing fountains and landscaping were removed. In their place, a new T-shaped fountain and water cascade was added, along with an attached stage. New windows were added along the upper walls. The existing Strawbridge staircase was removed and replaced with a more modern staircase and escalator.

Strawbridge's and Macy's both underwent substantial renovations during 1990 as well. The mall held a grand re-opening and 30th anniversary celebration from October 25-28, 1990.

=== The 1990s ===
Smoking was banned at the mall in indoor public areas on August 1, 1993.

In July of 1997, the Woolworth Corporation announced it was closing all of its namesake variety stores. At Cherry Hill, this meant the closing of both the Woolworth's store and the separate Grill restaurant, which was situated in the middle of the mall corridor. However, the Grill closure was short-lived, as the restaurant soon re-opened under new ownership.

=== The 2000s ===
As the mall reached its 40th anniversary in 2001, it remained the dominant shopping center in South Jersey, commanding the highest rents in the state. According to many residents, Cherry Hill Mall had become the town center for the area, which lacked a traditional downtown.

Swedish fast fashion retailer H&M opened a 22,500-square-foot (2,090 m^{2}) store in 2002 as a "mini-anchor", occupying a large portion of the former Woolworth's space. It was the chain's first store in the Philadelphia market.

On March 6, 2003, the Pennsylvania Real Estate Investment Trust (PREIT) announced that it was acquiring six malls, including Cherry Hill, from The Rouse Company for $548 million. At the time of sale, the Cherry Hill Mall was generating sales of $404 per square foot and held an occupancy rate of 94.5%.

The Strawbridge's store at the Cherry Hill Mall closed in early 2006, a victim of the merger between Federated Department Stores, the parent company of Macy's, and May Department Stores, the parent company of Strawbridge's. Since Cherry Hill already had a Macy's store, the Strawbridge's location became redundant.

=== PREIT renovation and Nordstrom addition ===
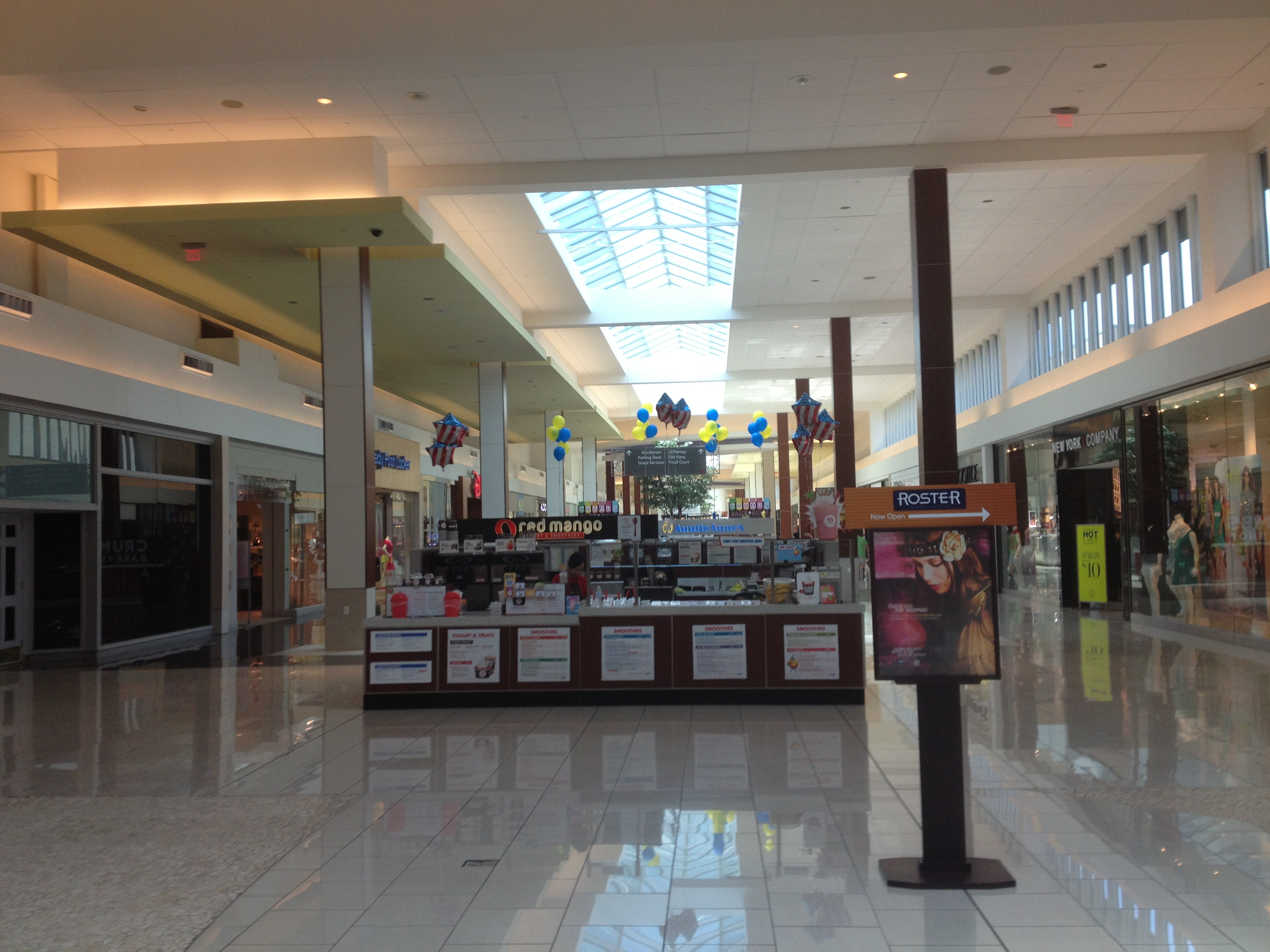
Cherry Hill Mall from Macy's

On March 23, 2006, the Courier-Post reported that PREIT planned to demolish the vacant Strawbridge's anchor store. In its place, the company would build a new two-story mall wing, an unnamed "fashion" anchor store, and a "bistro row" of restaurants and upscale shops, most with exterior entrances.

The plan was the mall's attempt to compete with the outdoor lifestyle centers that were beginning to replace aging malls during this era. The Courier-Post agreed with that strategy, writing in an editorial: "Outdoor 'lifestyle centers' such as the successful Promenade at Sagemore in Marlton seem to be the wave of the future. PREIT is wise to follow that model [...] It is sad to see a mall original go. However, Cherry Hill residents should be happy the mall will remain a vibrant and important part of their community."

On August 7, 2006, the local planning board approved an initial set of changes at the mall, allowing the construction of two free-standing stores in the mall's parking lot—a 34,000-square-foot (3,200 m^{2}) building for Crate & Barrel and a 25,000-square-foot (2,300 m^{2}) building for The Container Store. At the same time, PREIT announced that the mall's interior would receive a comprehensive renovation, and the food court would be relocated to a larger space inside the mall.

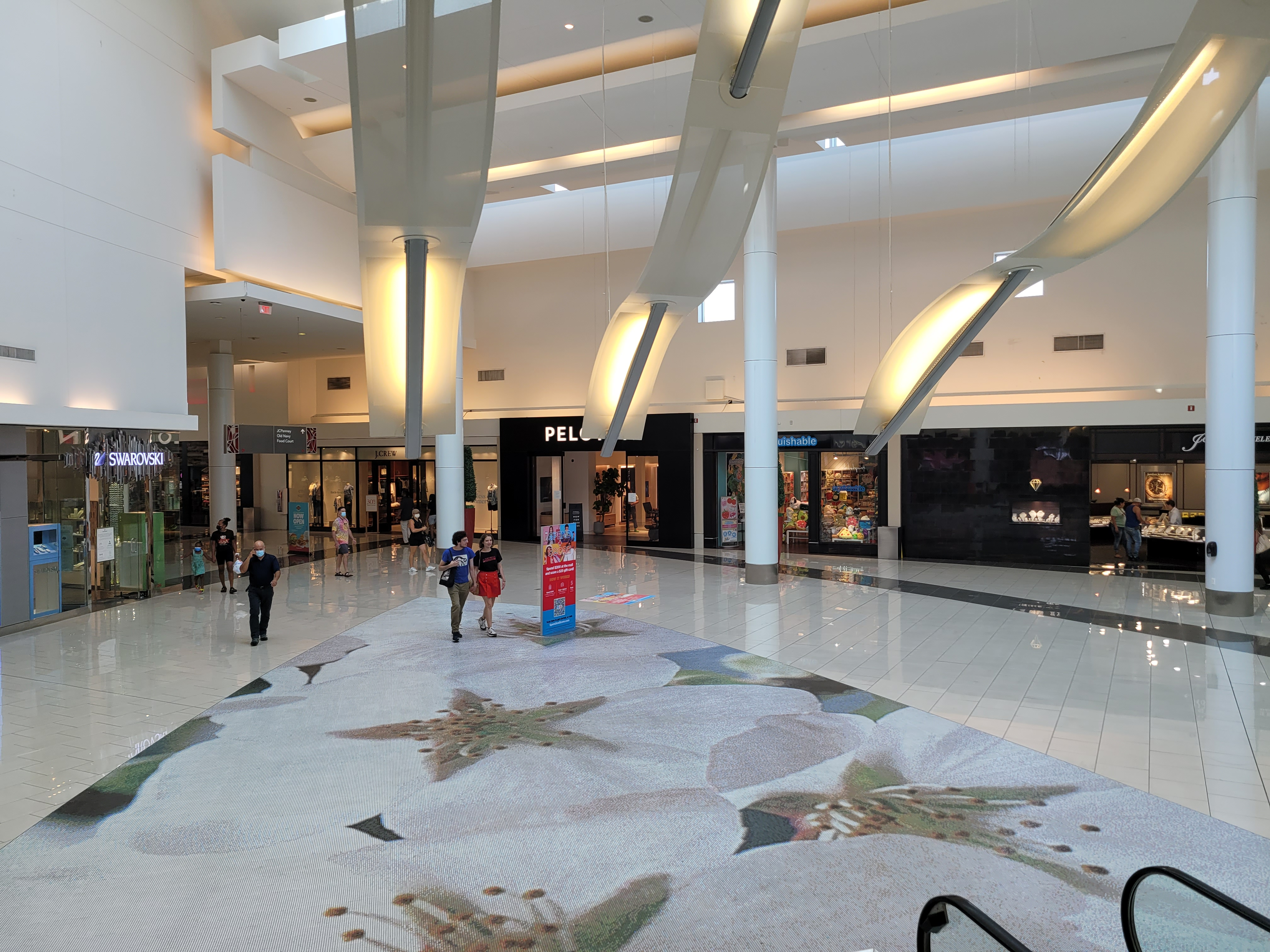
Cherry Hill Mall Grand Court

In September 2006, PREIT announced that Nordstrom would open a two-story, 138,000-square-foot (12,800 m^{2}) anchor store on a portion of the former Strawbridge's site. During this period, the mall began to seek more upscale retail tenants for the soon-to-be revamped mall.

Following more than two years of construction, the mall was ready to unveil its new look in the spring of 2009. The entire project cost $218 million. Replacing the former Cherry Court, the centerpiece was the new Grand Court, which featured skylights, a smaller fountain, and a tile mosaic floor in a cherry blossom design. The mall's revitalization also included a relocated food court, wood-wrapped columns, and new marble flooring throughout.

Nordstrom, a luxury fashion department store, held its grand opening on March 27, 2009.

=== One Cherry Hill demolition and Dick's House of Sport addition ===
In the fall of 2024, it was reported that the nine-story office building next to the mall, known as One Cherry Hill, would soon be demolished. The nearly 60-year-old building had long struggled with high vacancy rates, likely made worse by the 2020 pandemic.

On December 5, 2024, the township zoning board unanimously approved PREIT's plan to demolish the building. The demolition would allow for the construction of a fourth mall anchor—a two-story, 120,000-square-foot (11,000 m^{2}) Dick's House of Sport.

The office building was demolished during the summer of 2025.

Dick's House of Sport held its official grand opening on November 13, 2026, following a soft opening earlier in the month. The store opens onto both levels of the mall's JCPenney wing, with upper-level access via a connecting hallway. House of Sport is a large-format concept from Dick's Sporting Goods, focusing on "experience-driven retail". The Cherry Hill location includes a rock-climbing wall, golf simulators, and a multisport cage for athletes to test new equipment. Outdoors, a 10,300-square-foot (960 m^{2}) outdoor turf field and running track can convert to an ice-skating rink during winter.

== In popular culture ==
The Call of Duty: Black Ops Cold War DLC map "The Pines" is based on the Cherry Hill Mall.
