= Arthaus (Philadelphia) =

Residential skyscraper in Philadelphia

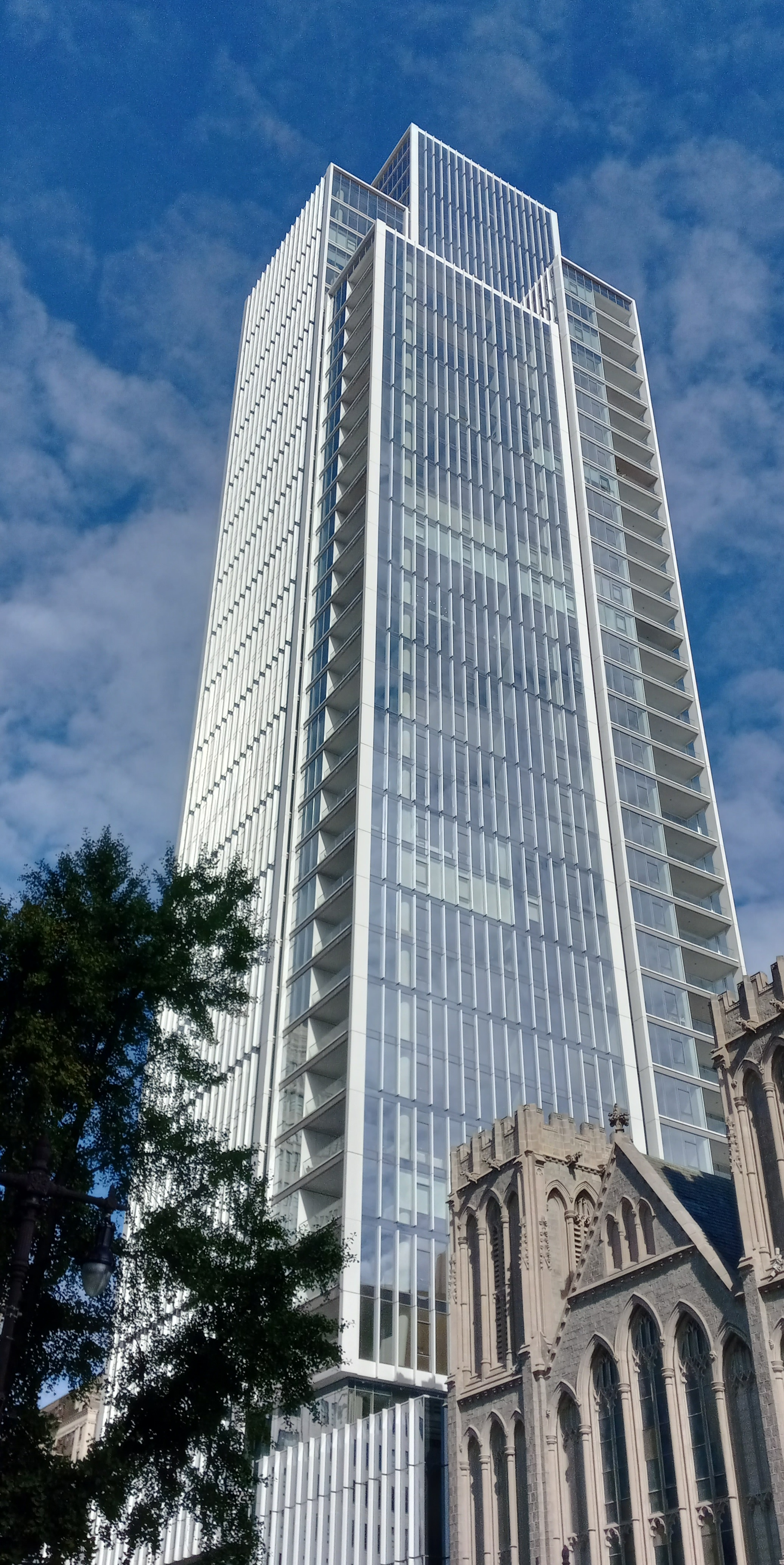
- Arthaus in October 2025

- Location within Philadelphia Arthaus (Philadelphia) (the United States)

General information
- Status: Completed
- Type: Mixed Use
- Architectural style: Modern
- Location: 301 S Broad Street, Philadelphia, Pennsylvania, United States
- Coordinates: 39°56′47″N 75°09′52″W
- Completed: 2022
- Cost: $253 million (USD)

Height
- Roof: 525 ft (160 m)

Technical details
- Floor count: 41

Design and construction
- Architect: Kohn Pederson Fox

Website
- arthausphila.com

Arthaus is a 525 ft (160 m) tall modern luxury residential skyscraper located on 301 South Broad Street in Philadelphia. It was built in 2022 for an estimated cost of $253 million and has 41 floors. As of January 2026 it is the 14th-tallest building in Philadelphia and the 22nd-tallest building in Pennsylvania. The building has 108 residential units and 36,000 sq ft of amenities including a fitness center, a rooftop greenhouse which is one of the first of its kind, a library, and an outdoor pool. There is also 4,200 sq ft of retail space at the ground floor.

The building is located in the Avenue of the Arts District, and sits opposite from the Kimmel Center for the Performing Arts. The building was designed by Kohn Pederson Fox who designed other skyscrapers in Philadelphia like the BNY Mellon Center, Two Logan Square, and One Logan Square. This building was Kohn Pedersen Fox's first residential skyscraper in Philadelphia.

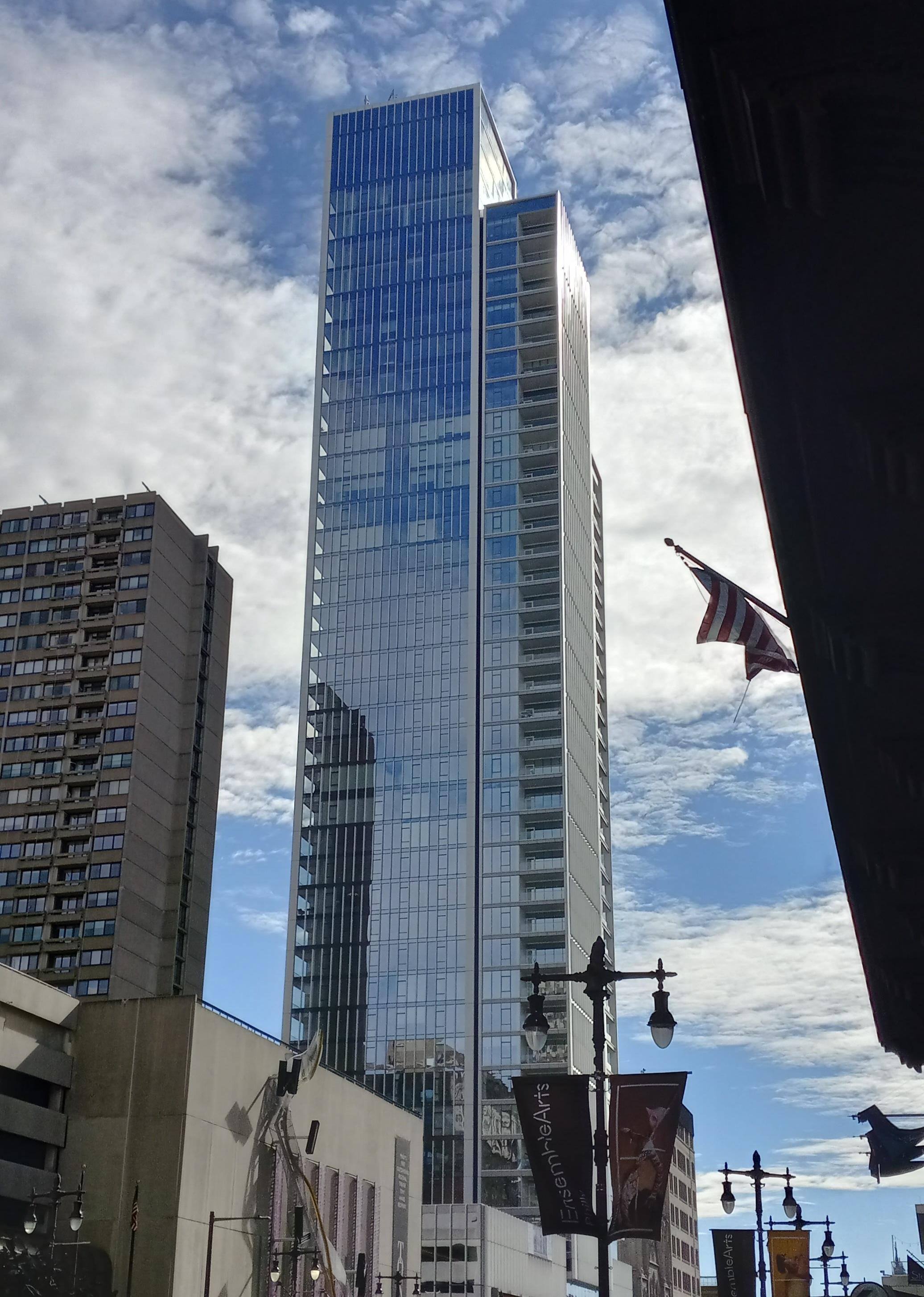
Arthaus seen from South Broad Street

== See also ==
- List of tallest buildings in Philadelphia
- List of tallest buildings in Pennsylvania
- The Laurel
