= Three Logan Square =

55-story high-rise office building located in Philadelphia

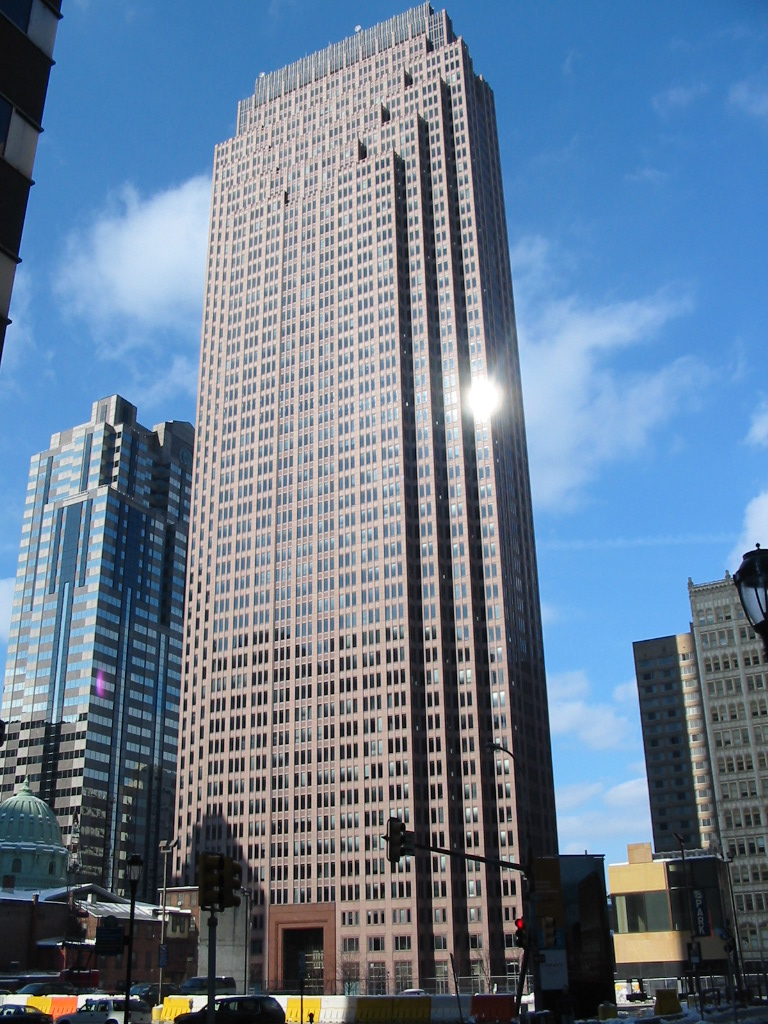

- Location within Philadelphia Location within Pennsylvania Location within the United States
- Former names: Bell Atlantic Tower

General information
- Type: Office
- Location: 1717 Arch Street; Philadelphia, Pennsylvania 19103; United States
- Coordinates: 39.9553707°N 75.1690149°W
- Completed: 1991
- Owner: Brandywine Realty Trust

Height
- Roof: 739 feet (225 m)

Technical details
- Floor count: 55

Design and construction
- Architect: Kling Lindquist Partnership
- Structural engineer: CBM Engineers
- Main contractor: Turner Construction

Three Logan Square, formerly known as the Bell Atlantic Tower, is a 55-story skyscraper located in Philadelphia, Pennsylvania. Standing 739 ft (225 m) tall to its structural top, the building encloses 1,300,000 square feet (120,000 m^{2}) of office space. The building, designed by the Philadelphia-based architecture firm Kling Lindquist, was completed in 1991.

A city ordinance dictates that no building within 250 feet (76 m) of the nearby Benjamin Franklin Parkway may rise taller than 250 feet (76 m); the tower stands just outside this zone. A landscaped plaza, constructed of the same red granite as the building, occupies the rest of the plot, fulfilling a city requirement that 1% of the total budget for new building construction must go toward a work of public art.

A banquet hall, known as Top of the Tower, occupies the top floor of the building and is available for public rentals.

It was the headquarters for Philadelphia-based Baby Bell Bell Atlantic until 1996, when Bell Atlantic acquired New York City-based NYNEX and moved its headquarters to New York. In 2000, Bell Atlantic and GTE merged to become Verizon and the "Bell Atlantic" name became obsolete. However, the building's managers kept the original name, mainly because of the difficulties in getting all necessary parties to agree to change it.

The building had been offered for sale in the past, and on August 5, 2010, it was sold to Brandywine Realty Trust. The company has since renamed the tower Three Logan Square, to better identify its location near two other Brandywine-owned buildings, One and Two Logan Square.

== Tenants ==
- CDI Corporation
- Comcast Cable
- Reed Smith
- Excelacom Inc
- Janney Montgomery Scott, LLC
- Warner Bros. Digital Labs
- Kleinbard
- Verizon
- Marsh & McLennan Companies
- Stantec
- Fowler Hirtzel McNulty & Spaulding LLC
- Fanatics, Inc.
- Mitchell & Ness

== See also ==
- List of tallest buildings in Philadelphia
- List of tallest buildings in Pennsylvania
- List of tallest buildings in the United States
- List of skyscrapers
- List of towers
