= 1835 Market Street =

High-rise building located in the Market West region of Philadelphia

Coordinates: 39°57′13″N 75°10′16″W

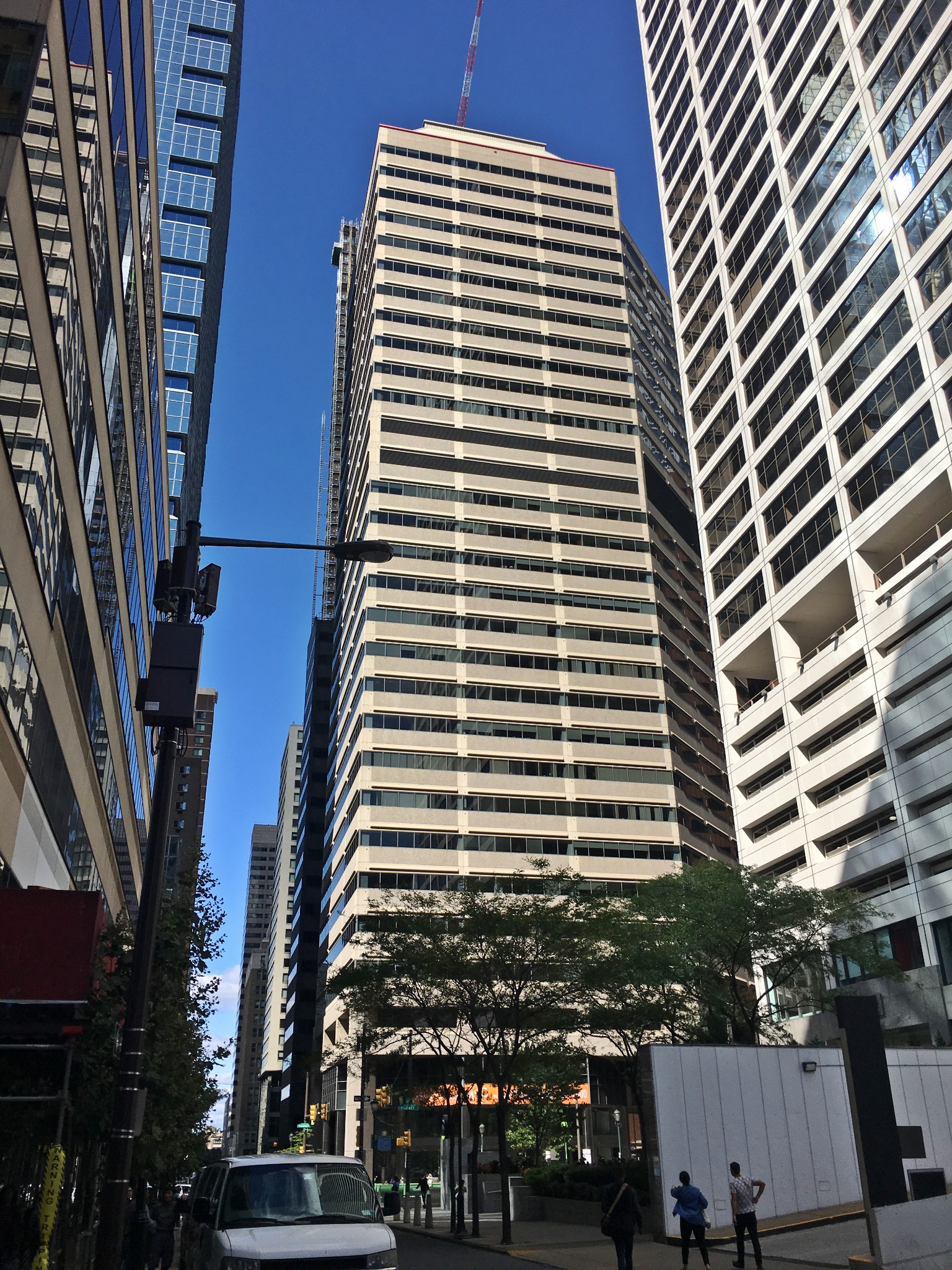

- Location within Philadelphia Location within Pennsylvania Location within the United States

General information
- Status: Completed
- Type: Office
- Location: 1835 Market Street, Philadelphia, Pennsylvania, United States
- Opening: 1986
- Owner: Nightingale Properties

Height
- Roof: 425 ft (130 m)

Technical details
- Floor count: 29
- Floor area: 686,503 square feet (63,778.2 m^{2})

Design and construction
- Architect: Kling Lindquist Partnership
- Developer: Radnor Corporation
- Main contractor: Turner Construction Company

Other information
- Parking: 176 spaces (underground)

1835 Market Street, formerly known as Eleven Penn Center (or 11 Penn Center), is a high-rise building located in the Market West region of Philadelphia. The building stands at 425 feet (130 meters) with 29 floors. Radnor Corp. the real estate arm of Sun Co. began development of the property in 1984. It opened in 1986 and Colonial Penn was one of the anchor tenants. The architectural firm who designed the building was the Kling Lindquist Partnership. 1835 Market Street is a part of Penn Center complex, which includes several notable skyscrapers such as the Mellon Bank Center and Five Penn Center.

It is currently the 24th-tallest building in Philadelphia.

== Ownership ==
In 2002, a joint venture including the California State Teachers' Retirement System (CalSTRS) purchased the tower for US$80,000,000. CalSTRS sold it to Nightingale Group for US$100,000,000 in 2014.

== See also ==
- List of tallest buildings in Philadelphia
- Buildings and architecture of Philadelphia
