= 2000 Market Street =

High-rise office building located in the Market West region of Philadelphia

Coordinates: 39.9533°N 75.1736°W

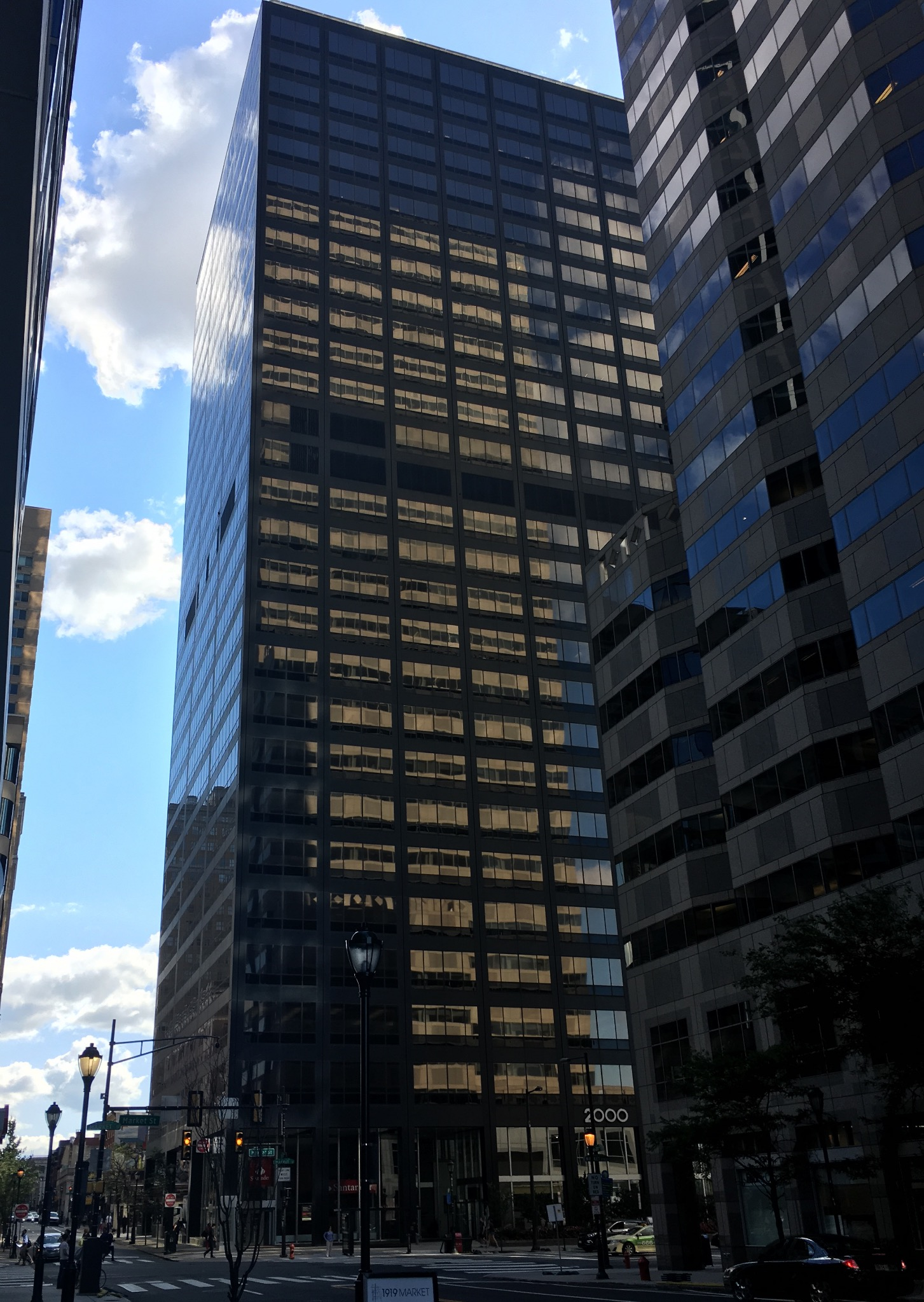

- Location within Philadelphia Location within Pennsylvania Location within the United States

General information
- Status: Completed
- Type: Office
- Location: 2000 Market Street, Philadelphia, Pennsylvania, United States
- Opening: 1973

Height
- Roof: 435 ft (133 m)

Technical details
- Floor count: 29

Design and construction
- Architects: Pitcairn Properties, Inc.
- Main contractor: Turner Construction Company

2000 Market Street is a high-rise office building located in the Market West region of Philadelphia. The building stands at a height of 435 feet (133 meters) with 29 floors, and was completed in 1973. It is currently tied with Two Logan Square as the 17th-tallest building in Philadelphia. The architect of the building was Pitcairn Properties, Inc.

== Tenants ==
- Santander Bank
- Fox Rothschild LLP
- The Board of Pensions of the Presbyterian Church (USA)
- The Coventry Deli
- John Dolan Enterprises, LLC
- Marshall Dennehey Warner Coleman & Goggin, P.C.
- Philadelphia office of US Senator Bob Casey Jr.
- Weber Gallagher LLP
- FCA Inc. Architecture, Planning, and Design

== See also ==
- List of tallest buildings in Philadelphia
- Buildings and architecture of Philadelphia
