= Jefferson Tower =

High-rise office building located in the Center City section of Philadelphia

Jefferson Center
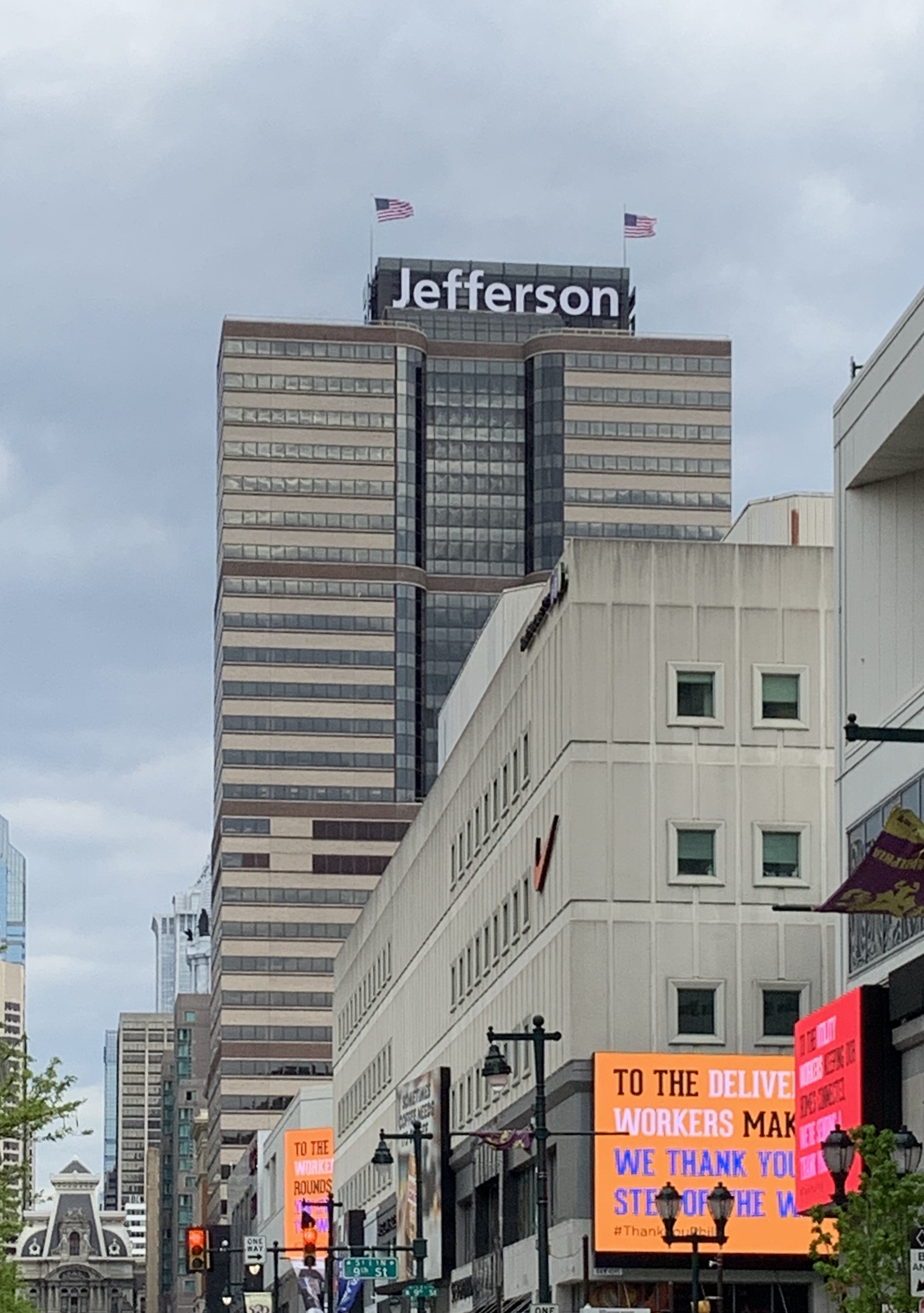
- Jefferson Center as viewed from the intersection Market and 8th streets.

- Location within Philadelphia Location within Pennsylvania Location within the United States

General information
- Status: Completed
- Type: Office
- Location: 1101 Market Street, Philadelphia, Pennsylvania, United States
- Coordinates: 39.9521°N 75.1585°W
- Opening: 1984

Height
- Roof: 412 ft (126 m)

Technical details
- Floor count: 32

Design and construction
- Architect: BLT Architects
- Developer: The Girard Estate

Jefferson Center, formerly known as the Aramark Tower and One Reading Center, is a high-rise office building located at 1101 Market Street in the Center City section of Philadelphia. The building stands 412 feet (126 meters) tall with 32 floors and is currently the 26th-tallest building in the city.

The building was originally conceived by the Reading Company while in a state of bankruptcy as a way to capitalize on its real estate holdings in Center City. Reading was granted development rights for the building along with a large parking complex in exchange for granting the city easements for developing the Jefferson Station (then Market East Station) entrance in the ground floor of the adjacent Reading Terminal. Construction soon began and the building was completed in 1984. The building was designed by Bower Lewis Thrower (BLT) Architects of Philadelphia.

In 2018, Aramark vacated the building when the company relocated its headquarters to 2400 Market Street. In its place, Thomas Jefferson University and Jefferson Health became the primary tenant. Thomas Jefferson University occupies 14 floors of the 32 story building, which was renamed Jefferson Center.

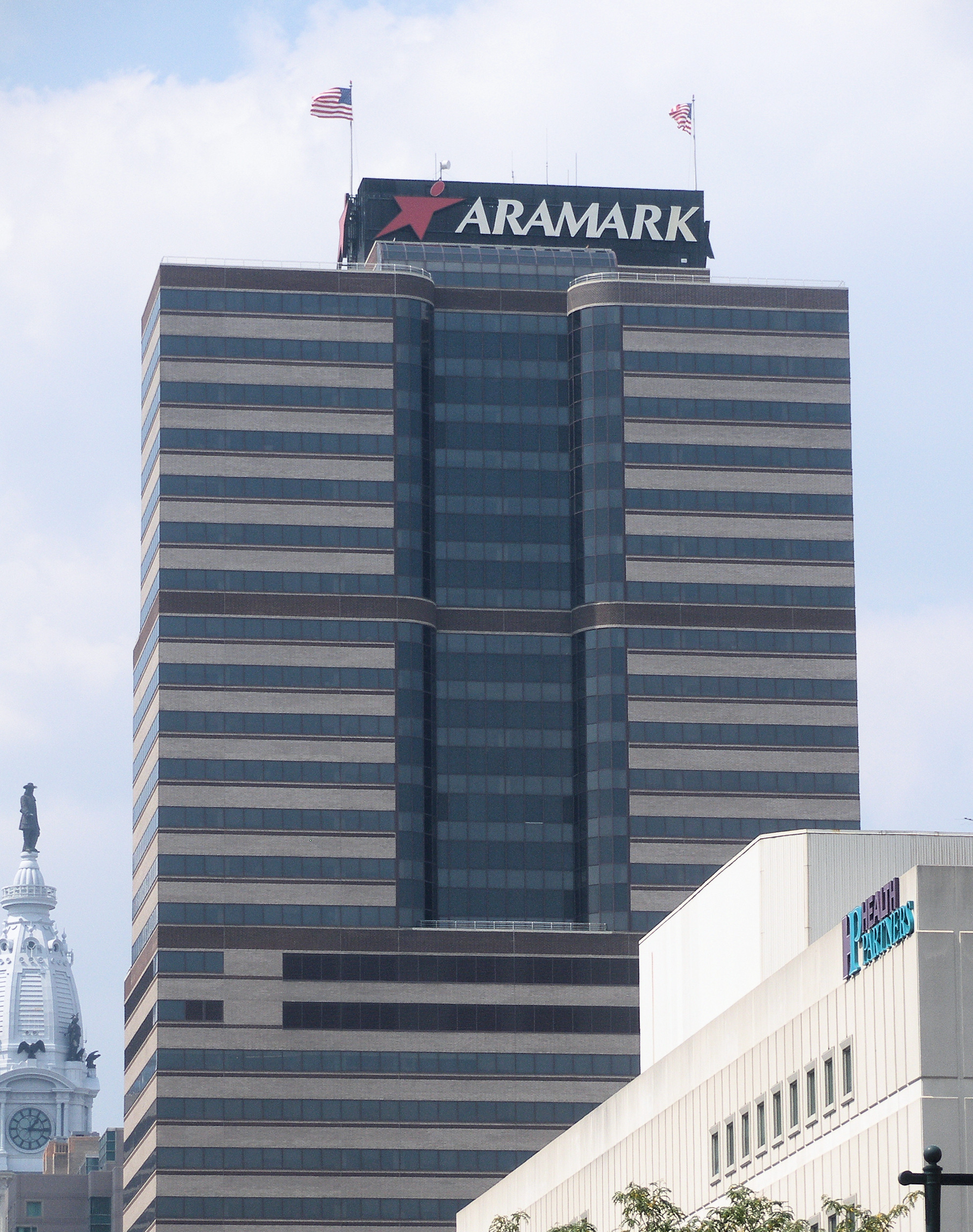
Previous Aramark signage.

== See also ==
- List of tallest buildings in Philadelphia
- Buildings and architecture of Philadelphia
