= List of tallest buildings in Philadelphia =

Skyline of Philadelphia
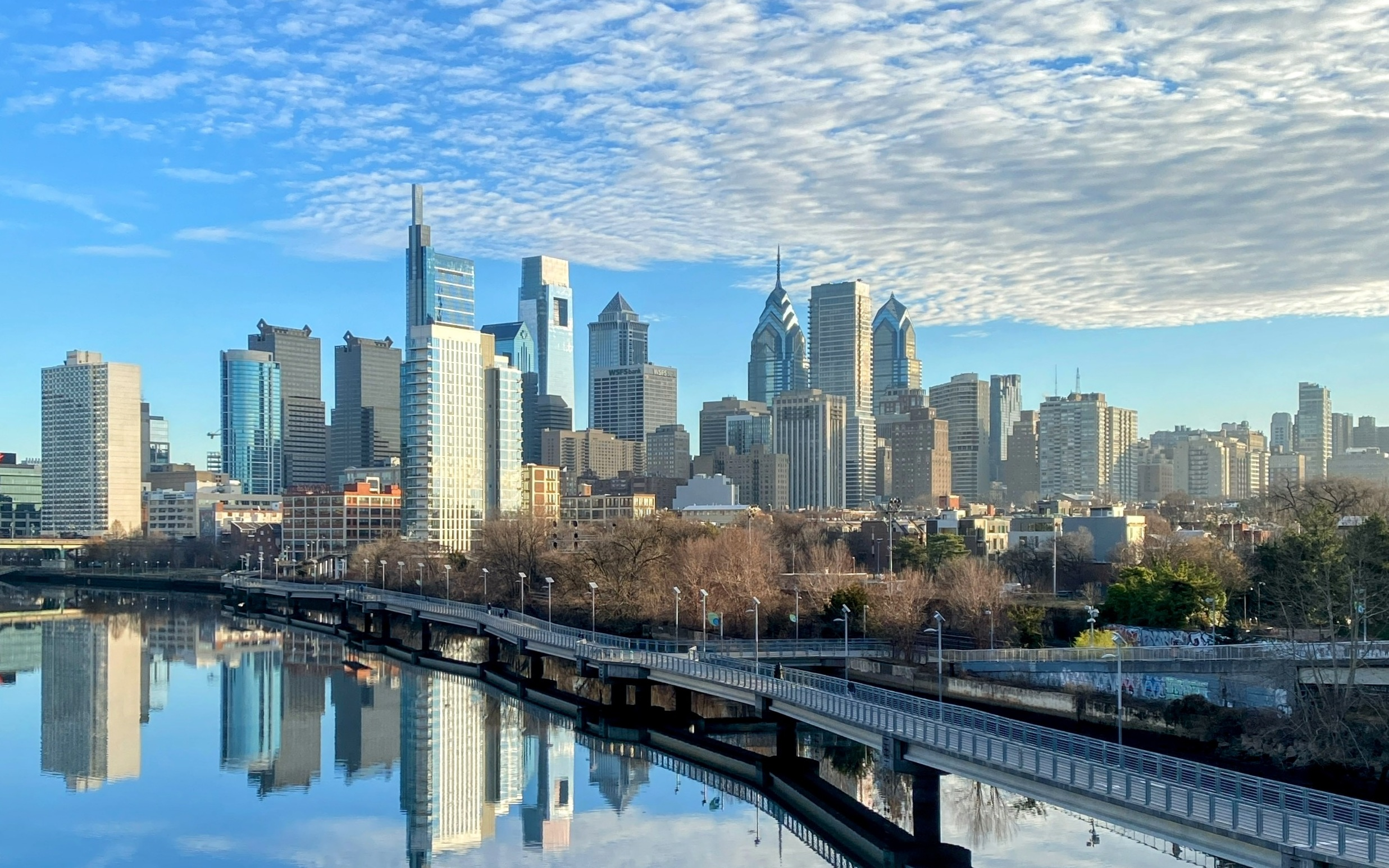
- Center City in 2024
- Tallest building: Comcast Technology Center (2018)
- Tallest building height: 1,113 ft (339.1 m)
- First 150 m+ building: Philadelphia City Hall (1901)

Number of tall buildings (2026)
- Taller than 100 m (328 ft): 65
- Taller than 150 m (492 ft): 18
- Taller than 200 m (656 ft): 7
- Taller than 300 m (984 ft): 1

Number of tall buildings — feet
- Taller than 300 ft (91.4 m): 86

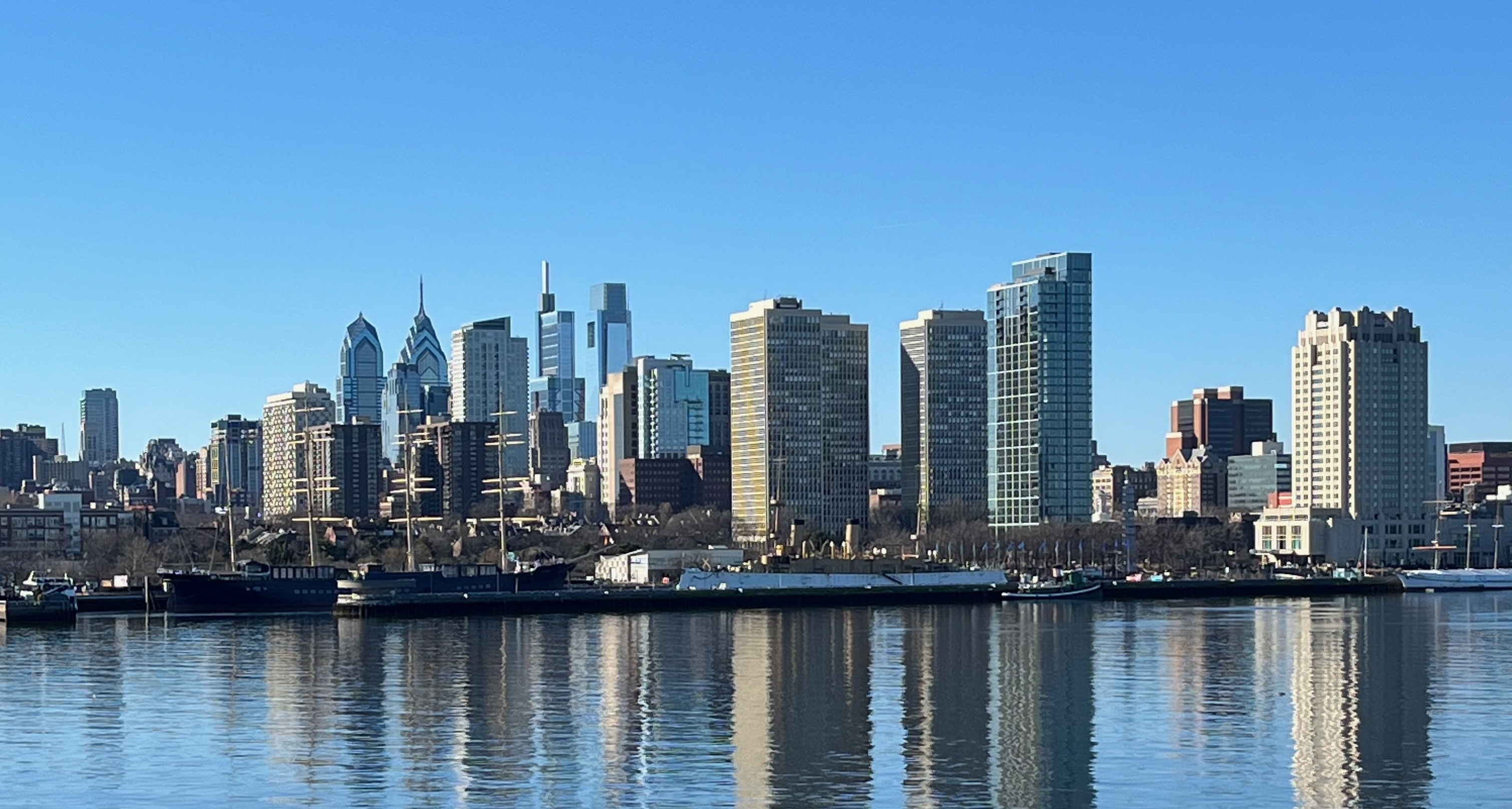
Philadelphia's skyline viewed from Camden in 2024

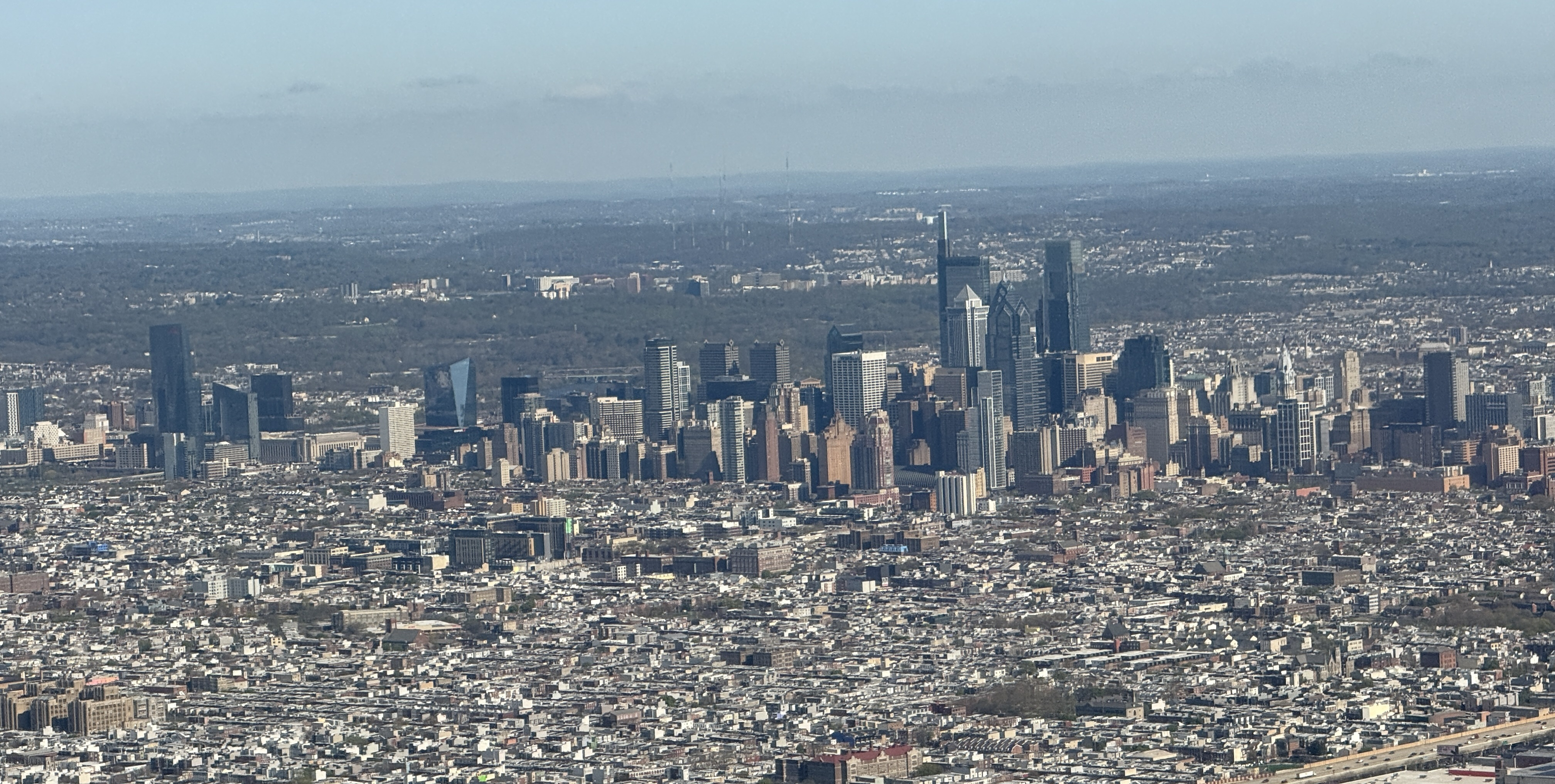
Aerial view of Center City and South Philadelphia in 2025

Philadelphia is the largest city in the U.S. state of Pennsylvania, with a metropolitan area population of 6.3 million as of 2024. Philadelphia is home to more than 350 completed high-rise buildings, 86 of which are 300 feet (91 m) or taller, as of 2026. Philadelphia has the largest skyline in Pennsylvania, and has the fourth most skyscrapers taller than 492 ft (150 m) in the Northeastern United States after New York City, Boston, and Jersey City. Seven of the ten tallest buildings in Pennsylvania are in Philadelphia; the remainder are in Pittsburgh. The tallest building in Philadelphia is the Comcast Technology Center, the city's sole supertall skyscraper, and the tallest building in the United States outside of New York City and Chicago. The 1,113 ft (339 m), 59-story building was opened in 2018.

Philadelphia has an extensive history of tall structures, generally thought to have begun with the 1754 addition of the steeple to Christ Church. The Philadelphia City Hall was the first building in the world to surpass a height of 500 ft (152 m) when it topped out in 1894, and remained the world's tallest building until 1908. Philadelphia had one of the largest pre-war construction booms in the United States, having built 18 buildings taller than 300 ft (91 m) by the early 1930s, the most of any city in the world besides New York City and Chicago. The Great Depression and World War II halted skyscraper development until the late 1950s. From the 1960s to 1980s, Philadelphia added a large number of office buildings to its skyline in a second boom. For most of the 20th century, a "gentlemen's agreement" imposed an unofficial height limit, restricting the height of any new skyscraper below that of the 548-foot (167 m) Philadelphia City Hall.

This agreement was broken with the topping out of One Liberty Place in 1987; at 945 feet (288 m), it exceeded the height of the city hall by almost 400 feet (122 m). Its twin, Two Liberty Place, was completed in 1990, near the end of the boom. Little development occurred during the 1990s, while a fire at One Meridian Plaza led to the rare demolition of a notable skyscraper in 1998. Construction resumed in the 2000s, with an increasing share of residential development. Comcast, which is based in Philadelphia, is responsible for the city's two tallest buildings. The 973 ft (297 m) Comcast Center was completed as the company's headquarters in 2008. It was the city's tallest building until the adjacent Comcast Technology Center was built in 2018, whose central floors house additional office space for Comcast.

Despite being one of the oldest cities in the United States, the twelve tallest buildings in Philadelphia were all built after 1986, due to the former gentlemen's agreement. Philadelphia's tallest buildings are largely concentrated in Center City, the city's central business district, mainly on its western half. Delaware River marks the end of the skyline to the east. Since the 2000s, Philadelphia's skyline has also expanded westwards past the Schuylkill River, towards University City. At 730 ft (223 m), FMC Tower at Cira Centre South is the Philadelphia's tallest building outside of Center City. The Schuykill Yards development plans to add several new skyscrapers to a plot of land northeast of Drexel University. A few high-rises can be found in and around Temple University, north of Center City.

== History ==
Number of buildings by height in Philadelphia by the end of each year. Click on the legend to toggle a specific height on or off. View chart definition.

== Cityscape ==
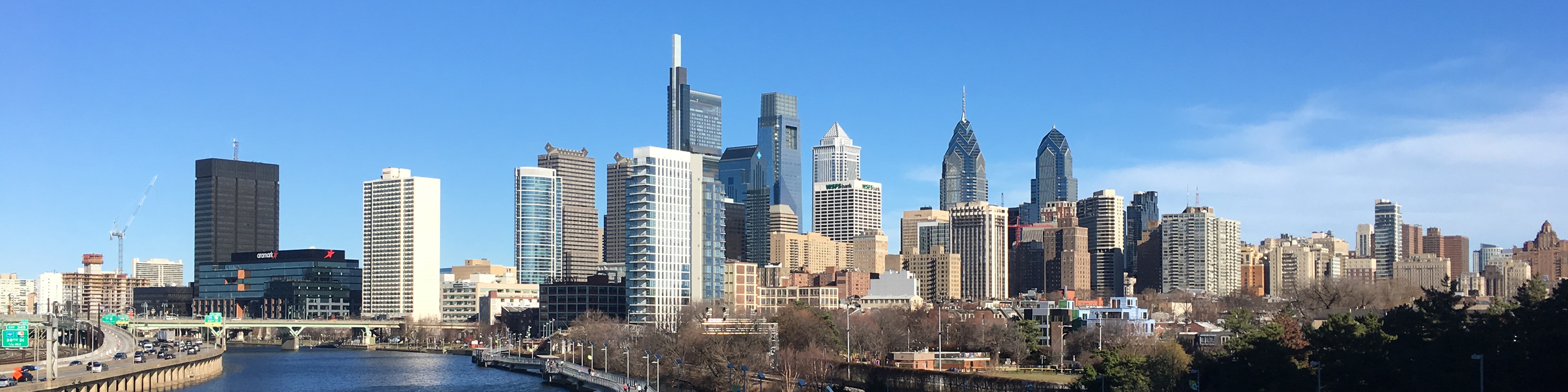
The Philadelphia skyline as seen from South Street Bridge in 2021 (Hover over image to identify buildings or click to visit the corresponding article)

== Map of tallest buildings ==
The map below shows the location of buildings taller than 300 feet (91.4 m) in Philadelphia. Each marker is numbered by height and colored by the decade of the building's completion. Two buildings, The Regatta and Temple University - Morgan Hall North, are not visible.

Buildings taller than 300 feet (91 m) in Philadelphia. An asterisk (*) next to the building's name indicates it is located outside the map.
- 1950s and before
- 1960s
- 1970s
- 1980s
- 1990s
- 2000s
- 2010s
- 2020s
1 Comcast Technology Center
2 Comcast Center
3 One Liberty Place
4 Two Liberty Place
5 BNY Mellon Center
6 Three Logan Square
7 FMC Tower at Cira Centre South
8 G. Fred DiBona Jr. Building
9 The W Philadelphia and Element Philadelphia
10 The Laurel
11 One Commerce Square
12 Two Commerce Square
13 Philadelphia City Hall
14 Arthaus
15 The Residences at The Ritz-Carlton
16 1818 Market Street
17 The St. James
18 Loews Philadelphia Hotel
19 PNC Bank Building
20 Five Penn Center
21 Centre Square II
22 Murano
23 One South Broad
24 Cira Centre
25 Two Logan Square
26 1700 Market
27 Evo at Cira Centre South
28 1835 Market Street
29 Jefferson Tower
30 Centre Square I
31 Wells Fargo Building
32 Ritz-Carlton Philadelphia
33 1706 Rittenhouse
34 One Logan Square
35 2000 Market Street
36 10 Rittenhouse Square
37 1500 Locust Street
38 Lewis Tower
39 PECO Building
40 1650 Arch Street
41 500 Walnut
42 Academy House
43 Drake Hotel
44 Penn Mutual Towers
45 Symphony House
46 CHOP Roberts Center for Pediatric Research
47 3025 JFK
48 The Alexander
49 Medical Tower Building
50 One Dock Street
51 Jefferson Health Honickman Center
52 Riverwalk I
53 2116 Chestnut
54 1400 Spring Garden Street
55 Land Title Building
56 210 West Rittenhouse Square
57 Inquirer Building
58 The Dorchester
59 2400 Chestnut Street Apartments
60 The Packard Grande
61 1919 Market
62 Franklin Tower Residences
63 One Penn Center
64 Sheraton Philadelphia Downtown Hotel
65 The Regatta*
66 One Penn Square West
67 Penn Medicine New Patient Pavilion
68 Josephine
69 Marriott Residence Inn Hotel Center City Philadelphia
70 1845 Walnut Street
71 1525 Locust Street
72 Riverwalk II
73 1500 Walnut Street
74 Hotel Palomar Philadelphia
75 3601 Market Street
76 1616 Walnut Street Building
77 Society Hill Towers I
78 Society Hill Towers II
79 Society Hill Towers III
80 Ten Penn Center
81 James A. Byrne United States Courthouse
82 30 South 17th Street
83 Temple University - Morgan Hall North*
84 Penn Center for Advanced Cellular Therapeutics
85 Hopkinson House
86 1528 Walnut Street

== Tallest buildings ==
This list ranks completed and topped out skyscrapers in Philadelphia that stand at least 300 feet (91 m) tall as of 2026, based on standard height measurement. This includes spires and architectural details but excludes antenna masts. The "Year" column indicates the year in which a building was completed. Buildings tied in height are sorted by year of completion with earlier buildings ranked first, and then alphabetically.

Was the tallest building in Pennsylvania upon completion

Rank	Name	Image	Location	Height ft (m)	Floors	Year	Purpose	Notes
1	Comcast Technology Center		1800 Arch Street 39°57′18″N 75°10′14″W	1,113 (339.1)	61	2018	Mixed-use	Construction broke ground July 2014; topped out on November 27, 2017; The tallest building in Pennsylvania, and the tallest building in the United States outside New York City and Chicago, the 14th-tallest building in the United States; opened to staff in July 2018 and the public in October 2018; tallest building completed in Philadelphia in the 2010s. A mixed-use office and hotel building.
2	Comcast Center		1701 John F. Kennedy Blvd 39°57′17″N 75°10′07″W	973 (296.7)	57	2008	Office	2nd-tallest building in Pennsylvania, 31st-tallest building in the country; tallest building completed in Philadelphia in the 2000s
3	One Liberty Place		1650 Market Street 39°57′09″N 75°10′05″W	945 (288)	61	1987	Office	Philadelphia's first skyscraper taller than City Hall. Third-tallest building in the state; 28th-tallest building in the country; tallest building completed in Philadelphia in the 1980s
4	Two Liberty Place		1601 Chestnut Street 39°57′06″N 75°10′03″W	848 (258.5)	58	1990	Mixed-use	Mixed-use office and residential building. Tallest building completed in Philadelphia in the 1990s
5	BNY Mellon Center		1735 Market Street 39°57′13″N 75°10′10″W	792 (241.4)	54	1990	Office	63rd-tallest building in the country, also known as Nine Penn Center
6	Three Logan Square		1717 Arch Street 39°57′19″N 75°10′09″W	739 (225.3)	55	1991	Office	112th-tallest building in the country, formerly known as Bell Atlantic Tower and Verizon Tower
7	FMC Tower at Cira Centre South		2929 Walnut Street 39°57′08″N 75°11′01″W	730 (222.5)	49	2017	Mixed-use	Mixed-use office, hotel, and residential building. 121st-tallest building in the country, the tallest building in Philadelphia outside Center City
8	G. Fred DiBona Jr. Building		1901 Market Street 39°57′14″N 75°10′19″W	625 (190.5)	45	1990	Office	Formerly known as the Blue Cross-Blue Shield Tower and the IBX Tower
9	The W Philadelphia and Element Philadelphia		1441 Chestnut Street 39°57′04″N 75°09′54″W	617 (188)	51	2020	Hotel	Tallest building completed in Philadelphia in the 2020s
10	The Laurel		1909-11 Walnut Street 39°57′03″N 75°10′23″W	599 (182.6)	50	2022	Residential	Tallest fully residential building in Philadelphia and in Pennsylvania
11	One Commerce Square		2005 W. Market Street 39°57′15″N 75°10′29″W	572 (174.4)	41	1987	Office	One and Two Commerce Square are the tallest twin buildings in Philadelphia, and the sixth-tallest twin buildings in the United States.
12	Two Commerce Square		2001 W. Market Street 39°57′15″N 75°10′25″W	572 (174.4)	41	1992	Office	One and Two Commerce Square are the tallest twin buildings in Philadelphia, and the sixth-tallest twin buildings in the United States.
13	Philadelphia City Hall		1 Penn Square 39°57′10″N 75°09′49″W	548 (167)	7	1901	Government	1901 is the official year of completion and the transfer of ownership to the city government; however, the tower had been topped out in 1894 and the building had been partially occupied by then, making it the tallest habitable building in the United States and the world from 1894 until the completion of the Singer Building in 1908; tallest building completed in Philadelphia in the 1900s.
14	Arthaus	Arthaus_b	301 S. Broad Street 39°56′47″N 75°09′52″W	525 (159.9)	41	2022	Residential	
15	The Residences at The Ritz-Carlton		1414 South Penn Square 39°57′05″N 75°09′54″W	518 (157.9)	46	2009	Residential	
16	1818 Market Street		1818 Market Street 39°57′11″N 75°10′16″W	500 (152.4)	40	1974	Office	Tallest building completed in Philadelphia in the 1970s
17	The St. James		200 West Washington Square 39°56′52″N 75°09′15″W	498 (151.8)	45	2004	Residential	Tallest building located east of Broad Street. When constructed in 2003, the St. James was the tallest apartment building in Philadelphia.
18	Loews Philadelphia Hotel		1200 Market Street 39°57′06″N 75°09′37″W	492 (150)	36	1932	Hotel	Formerly known as the PSFS Building; tallest hotel in the city until the Four Seasons opened in the Comcast Technology Center, tallest building in Philadelphia completed in the 1930s, 2nd-tallest in Philadelphia at the time of completion, the building reaches a height of 750 feet (229 m) with its antenna, total building area is 631,006 square feet (58,622.4 m^{2});
19	PNC Bank Building		1600 Market Street 39°57′09″N 75°10′02″W	491 (149.7)	40	1983	Office	
20	Five Penn Center		1601 Market Street 39°57′11″N 75°10′02″W	490 (149.4)	36	1970	Office	
21	Centre Square II		Market and 15th streets 39°57′08″N 75°10′00″W	490 (149.4)	40	1973	Office	
22	Murano		2101 Market Street 39°57′15″N 75°10′32″W	475 (144.8)	42	2008	Residential	
23	One South Broad		1 S. Broad Street 39°57′04″N 75°09′49″W	474 (144.4)	28	1932	Office	Formerly known as the Lincoln-Liberty Building and the PNB (Philadelphia National Bank) Building.
24	Cira Centre		30th and Arch streets 39°57′26″N 75°10′57″W	437 (133.1)	28	2005	Office	
25	Two Logan Square		100 N. 18th Street 39°57′21″N 75°10′11″W	435 (132.6)	35	1987	Office	
26	1700 Market		1700 Market Street 39°57′10″N 75°10′09″W	430 (131)	32	1968	Office	Tallest building completed in Philadelphia in the 1960s.
27	Evo at Cira Centre South		2930 Chestnut Street 39°57′11″N 75°11′00″W	427 (130)	36	2014	Residential	
28	1835 Market Street		1835 Market Street 39°57′13″N 75°10′16″W	425 (129.5)	29	1986	Office	Formerly known as Eleven Penn Center until 2003.
29	Jefferson Tower		1101 Market Street 39°57′08″N 75°09′30″W	417 (127.1)	31	1984	Office	Formerly known as One Reading Center and the Aramark Tower.
30	Centre Square I		1500 Market Street 39°57′07″N 75°09′57″W	417 (127)	32	1973	Office	
31	Wells Fargo Building		123 S. Broad Street 39°56′59″N 75°09′49″W	405 (123.5)	29	1927	Office	Tallest building completed in Philadelphia in the 1920s.
32	Ritz-Carlton Philadelphia		28-32 South Broad Street 39°57′05″N 75°09′51″W	404 (123.1)	30	1930	Hotel	
33	1706 Rittenhouse		1706 Rittenhouse Square 39°56′53″N 75°10′11″W	401 (122)	31	2010	Residential	
34	One Logan Square		130 N. 18th Street 39°57′23″N 75°10′13″W	400 (121.9)	31	1983	Mixed-use	Mixed-use office and hotel building
35	2000 Market Street		2000 Market Street 39°57′12″N 75°10′25″W	399 (121.6)	29	1973	Office	
36	10 Rittenhouse Square	–	1801 Walnut Street 39°57′03″N 75°10′15″W	396 (120.7)	33	2009	Residential	
37	1500 Locust Street	–	1500 Locust Street 39°56′54″N 75°10′00″W	390 (118.9)	44	1973	Residential	
38	Lewis Tower		1419 Locust Street 39°56′55″N 75°09′57″W	389 (118.6)	33	1929	Residential	Also known as Aria. Completed as an office building.
39	PECO Building		2301 Market Street 39°57′16″N 75°10′44″W	384 (117.1)	25	1970	Office	
40	1650 Arch Street	–	1650 Arch Street 39°57′17″N 75°10′04″W	384 (117)	27	1975	Office	
41	500 Walnut	–	500 Walnut Street 39°56′50″N 75°08′59″W	380 (115.8)	26	2017	Residential	
42	Academy House	–	1420 Locust Street 39°56′53″N 75°09′57″W	377 (114.9)	37	1975	Residential	
43	Drake Hotel		1512 Spruce Street 39°56′49″N 75°10′02″W	375 (114.3)	32	1929	Hotel	Underwent a renovation in 1998. Now also known as The Drake.
44	Penn Mutual Towers		510 Walnut Street 39°56′50″N 75°09′00″W	375 (114.3)	20	1972	Office	
45	Symphony House	–	440 Avenue of the Arts 39°56′43″N 75°09′56″W	375 (114.3)	31	2007	Residential	
46	CHOP Roberts Center for Pediatric Research	–	734 Schuylkill Avenue 39°56′44″N 75°11′12″W	375 (114.3)	23	2017	Mixed-use	Mixed-use office and hospital building
47	3025 JFK	–	3025 John F Kennedy Boulevard 39°57′23″N 75°11′08″W	371 (113)	28	2023	Mixed-use	Mixed-use residential and office building
48	The Alexander		1601 Vine Street 39°57′32″N 75°09′58″W	370 (112.8)	32	2018	Residential	
49	Medical Tower Building	–	255 South 17th Street 39°56′53″N 75°10′10″W	364 (111)	30	1930	Office	
50	One Dock Street	–	1 Dock Street 39°56′44″N 75°08′36″W	364 (111)	31	2023	Residential	Also known as The Ryland Modern Apartments
51	Jefferson Health Honickman Center	–	1101 Chestnut Street 39°57′02″N 75°09′33″W	364 (111)	19	2024	Health	
52	Riverwalk I		30 North 23rd Street 39°57′22″N 75°10′41″W	363 (110.6)	32	2022	Residential	
53	2116 Chestnut	–	2116 Chestnut Street 39°57′08″N 75°10′36″W	356 (108.5)	34	2013	Residential	
54	1400 Spring Garden Street	–	1400 Spring Garden Street 39°57′43″N 75°09′44″W	351 (107)	19	1958	Office	Also known as the Pennsylvania State Office Building.
55	Land Title Building		100 South Broad Street 39°57′02″N 75°09′52″W	344 (104.9)	22	1902	Office	
56	210 West Rittenhouse Square	–	210 West Rittenhouse Square 39°57′00″N 75°10′24″W	342 (104.2)	33	1989	Hotel	Also known as The Rittenhouse.
57	Inquirer Building	–	400 North Broad Street 39°57′36″N 75°09′44″W	340 (103.6)	18	1924	Residential	Also known by its address, 400 North Broad Street, or the Elverson Building.
58	The Dorchester	–	226 West Rittenhouse Square 39°56′56″N 75°10′25″W	339 (103.3)	32	1963	Residential	Also known as Rittenhouse Dorchester Apartments.
59	2400 Chestnut Street Apartments	–	2400 Chestnut Street 39°57′09″N 75°10′46″W	337 (102.7)	34	1979	Residential	
60	The Packard Grande	–	111 South 15th Street 39°57′02″N 75°09′56″W	336 (102.4)	25	1924	Residential	Also known simply as The Grande.
61	1919 Market	–	1919 Market Street 39°57′14″N 75°10′22″W	335 (102)	29	2016	Residential	
62	Franklin Tower Residences	–	200 North 16th Street 39°57′25″N 75°09′59″W	331 (100.9)	26	1980	Residential	Formerly known as One Franklin Plaza.
63	One Penn Center		1617 JFK Boulevard 39°57′15″N 75°10′03″W	330 (100.6)	20	1930	Office	Also known as the Suburban Station Building.
64	Sheraton Philadelphia Downtown Hotel	–	201 North 17th Street 39°57′26″N 75°10′02″W	330 (100.6)	29	1980	Hotel	
65	The Regatta	–	901 North Penn Street 39°57′43″N 75°08′02″W	329 (100.3)	29	2006	Residential	Part of the Waterfront Square complex
66	One Penn Square West	–	1 Penn Square West 39°57′05″N 75°09′57″W	325 (99)	25	1985	Office	
67	Penn Medicine New Patient Pavilion	–	South 33rd Street & Convention Avenue 39°56′55″N 75°11′30″W	325 (99)	17	2021	Health	
68	Josephine	–	1620 Sansom Street 39°57′02″N 75°10′05″W	320 (97.5)	27	2024	Residential	
69	Marriott Residence Inn Hotel Center City Philadelphia		1 East Penn Square 39°57′09″N 75°09′44″W	319 (97.2)	25	1930	Hotel	
70	1845 Walnut Street	1845_Walnut_Street	1845 Walnut Street 39°57′02″N 75°10′18″W	319 (97.2)	25	1972	Office	
71	1525 Locust Street	–	1525 Locust Street 39°56′56″N 75°10′03″W	315 (96)	19	1991	Office	
72	Riverwalk II	–	60 North 23rd Street 39°57′24″N 75°10′41″W	315 (96)	28	2021	Residential	
73	1500 Walnut Street	–	1500 Walnut Street 39°56′57″N 75°09′58″W	313 (95.4)	23	1927	Office	
74	Hotel Palomar Philadelphia		117 South 17th Street 39°57′03″N 75°10′07″W	313 (95.4)	24	1930	Hotel	
75	3601 Market Street	–	3601 Market Street 39°57′24″N 75°11′40″W	309 (94.3)	28	2015	Residential	
76	1616 Walnut Street Building		1616 Walnut Street 39°56′58″N 75°10′06″W	309 (94.2)	24	1929	Residential	Also known as ICON.
77	Society Hill Towers I		200 Locust Street 39°56′45″N 75°08′41″W	309 (94.2)	31	1964	Residential	
78	Society Hill Towers II		210 Locust Street 39°56′44″N 75°08′42″W	309 (94.2)	31	1964	Residential	
79	Society Hill Towers III		220 Locust Street 39°56′42″N 75°08′40″W	309 (94.2)	31	1964	Residential	
80	Ten Penn Center	–	1801 Market Street 39°57′13″N 75°10′14″W	306 (93.3)	27	1981	Office	
81	James A. Byrne United States Courthouse		601 Market Street 39°57′05″N 75°09′04″W	303 (92.4)	26	1970	Government	
82	30 South 17th Street	–	30 South 17th Street 39°57′08″N 75°10′10″W	302 (92.1)	20	1975	Office	Also known as United Plaza and the United Engineers Building.
83	Temple University - Morgan Hall North		1601 North Broad Street 39°58′42″N 75°09′26″W	302 (92)	27	2013	Residential	
84	Penn Center for Advanced Cellular Therapeutics	–	3400 Civic Center Boulevard 39°56′50″N 75°11′32″W	302 (92)	19	2016	Office	
85	Hopkinson House	–	604 South Washington Square 39°56′46″N 75°09′09″W	301 (91.8)	35	1962	Residential	
86	1528 Walnut Street	–	1528 Walnut Street 39°56′58″N 75°10′02″W	300 (91.4)	21	1929	Office	

=== Philadelphia metropolitan area ===
Philadelphia metropolitan area
- Population: 6,330,422 (2024 estimate)
- Cities included: Philadelphia, Camden, Wilmington

Number of tall buildings
- Taller than 100 m (328 ft): 67 (2025)
- Taller than 150 m (492 ft): 18 (2025)
- Taller than 200 m (656 ft): 7
- Taller than 300 m (984 ft): 1

Number of tall buildings — feet
- Taller than 300 ft (91.4 m): 88 (2025)

In addition to those in the city of Philadelphia, there are two buildings located in the Philadelphia metropolitan area that are taller than 300 feet (91 m).

Rank	Name	Image	City	Height ft (m)	Floors	Year	Purpose	Notes
1	Camden City Hall		Camden 39°56′41″N 75°07′12″W	371 (113.1)	18	1931	Government	Tallest building in Camden.
2	1201 North Market Street		Wilmington 39°44′52″N 75°32′48″W	360 (109.8)	23	1988	Office	Tallest building in Wilmington.

== Tallest under construction or proposed ==
=== Under construction ===
The following table ranks buildings under construction in Philadelphia that are expected to be at least 300 ft (91 m) tall as of 2026, based on standard height measurement. The “Year” column indicates the expected year of completion. Buildings that are on hold are not included.

Name	Height ft (m)	Floors	Year	Notes
Harper Square	540 (165)	45	2027	Would become the tallest residential building in Philadelphia. Demolition completed in September 2024.
CHOP New Patient Tower	433 (132)	23	–	
The Mark	414 (126)	34	2026	Marketed as student housing in University City.
CHOP SARB	320 (98)	17	2025	SARB stands for the Schuylkill Avenue Research Building.
2301 JFK Boulevard	307 (94)	22	2025	

=== Approved ===
The following table ranks approved buildings in Philadelphia that are expected to be at least 300 ft (91 m) tall, based on standard height measurement. The “Year” column indicates the expected year of completion. A dash “–“ indicates information about the building is unknown or not released.

Name	Height ft (m)	Floors	Status
1826 Chestnut Street	550 (168)	42	–

=== Proposed ===
The following table ranks proposed buildings in Philadelphia that are expected to be at least 300 ft (91 m) tall, based on standard height measurement. A dash “–“ indicates information about the building is unknown or not released.

Name	Height ft (m)	Floors	Year	Notes
Transit Terminal Tower	1,200 (366)	85	–	Would be the tallest in Pennsylvania if built.
3101 Market	1,095 (334)	70	–	Would be the second tallest in the city if built. Part of the Schuylkill Yards development.
Penn's Landing Redevelopment Tower 1	703 (214)	53	–	Will be tallest building east of Broad Street if built.
Broad and Lombard	542 (165)	43	–	
3001 JFK Boulevard	512 (156)	34	–	Part of the Schuylkill Yards development.
Two Cathedral Square	470 (143)	34	–	Part of the Cathedral Square development.
1301 Market Street	460 (140)	32	–	
Mellon Independence Center Tower	429 (131)	30	–	Also called the MIC Tower.
The Arbour House	414 (126)	35	–	
76 Place at Market East Tower	412 (126)	30	–	Part of the new 76ers arena complex
1341 South Christopher Columbus Boulevard	382 (116)	36	–	

== Tallest demolished ==
There have been three buildings taller than 300 ft (91 m) in Philadelphia that no longer stand today.

Name	Image	Height ft (m)	Floors	Year completed	Year demolished	Notes
One Meridian Plaza	–	492 (150)	38	1972	1999	One Meridian Plaza, formerly known as the Fidelity Mutual Life Building, Three Girard Plaza and Three Mellon Bank Center, was severely damaged by a fire in 1991. The fire destroyed eight floors and damaged nearby buildings. It sat vacant for eight years until 1999 when it was demolished.
Sheraton Penn Center Hotel	–	338 (103) (Note: Height is an estimate.)	27	1957	1988	
Arcade Building		300 (91.4)	21	1901	1969	Also known as Commercial Trust Building.

== Timeline of tallest buildings ==
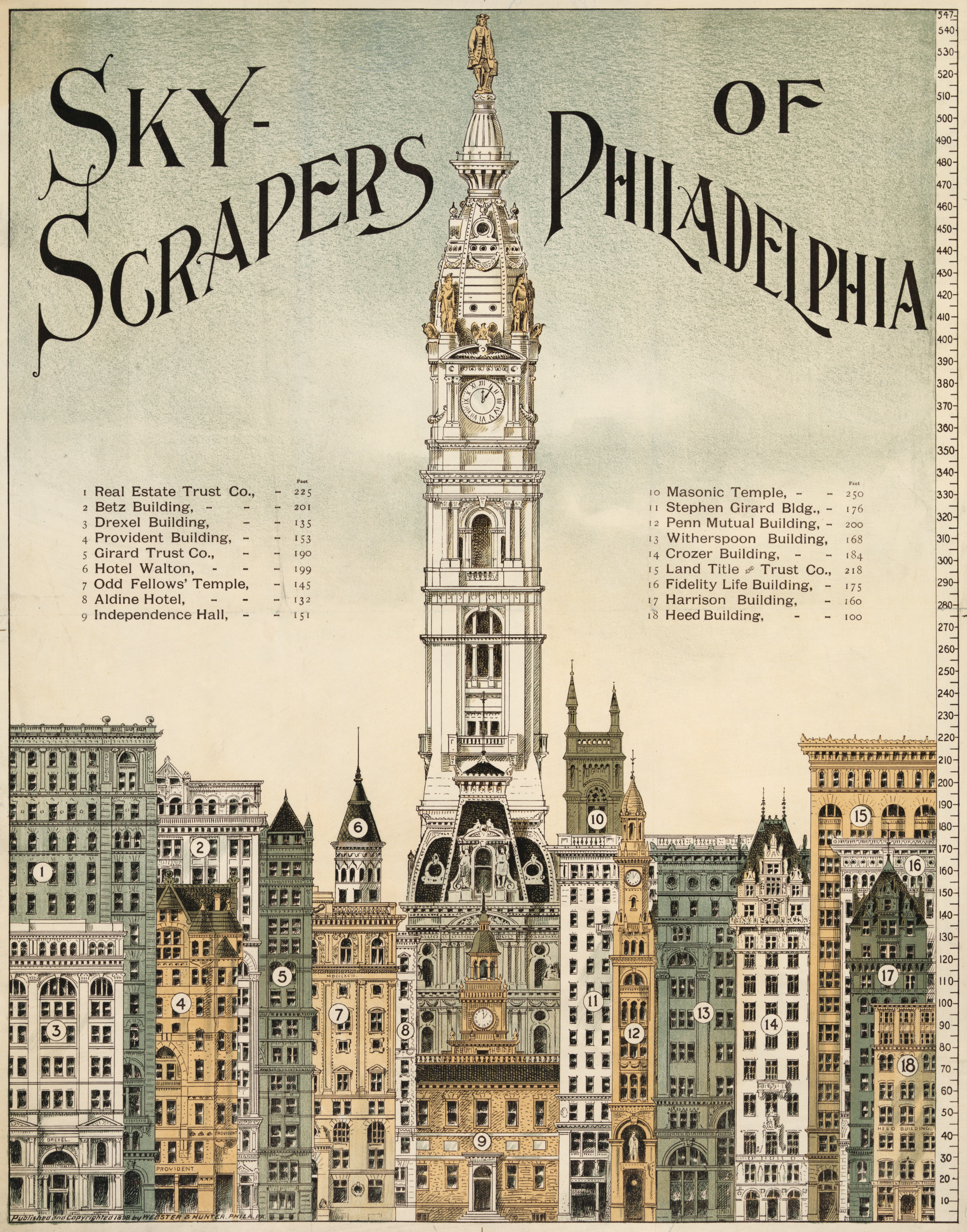
An 1898 poster of skyscrapers in Philadelphia

Philadelphia has seen few city record-holders compared to other cities with comparable skylines. Although churches, cathedrals, and the like are not technically considered to be skyscrapers, Christ Church, after being surmounted with its lofty spire in 1754, stood as its tallest building for 102 years before being surpassed by the (no longer extant) spire of Tenth Presbyterian Church, which was surpassed by City Hall in 1894. Then, due to the "gentlemen's agreement" not to build higher than the top of the statue of William Penn atop City Hall, that building stood as the city's tallest structure for 93 years; it also held the world record for tallest habitable building from 1894 until the 1908 completion of the Singer Building in New York City.

Name	Image	Street address	Years as tallest	Height ft (m)	Floors	Architect	Reference
Independence Hall		520 Chestnut Street	1748–1754	134 (41)	2	Edmund Woolley and Andrew Hamilton	
Christ Church		20 North American Street	1754–1856	196 (60)	—	Robert Smith	
Tenth Presbyterian Church		17th & Spruce Streets	1856–1894	250 (76)	—	John McArthur Jr.	
Philadelphia City Hall		Broad & Market Streets	1894–1987	548 (167)	9	John McArthur Jr.	
One Liberty Place		1650 Market Street	1987–2008	945 (288)	61	Helmut Jahn	
Comcast Center		1701 John F. Kennedy Boulevard	2008–2017	974 (297)	57	Robert A. M. Stern Architects	
Comcast Technology Center		1800 Arch Street	2017–present	1,121 (342)	60	Norman Foster	

== See also ==
- Buildings and architecture of Philadelphia
- List of tallest buildings in Harrisburg
- List of tallest buildings in Pittsburgh
- List of tallest buildings in Reading, Pennsylvania
- List of tallest buildings in Pennsylvania
- List of tallest buildings in Camden
- List of tallest buildings in the United States
