= 1700 Market =

High-rise building located in Philadelphia

Coordinates: 39.9527°N 75.1691°W

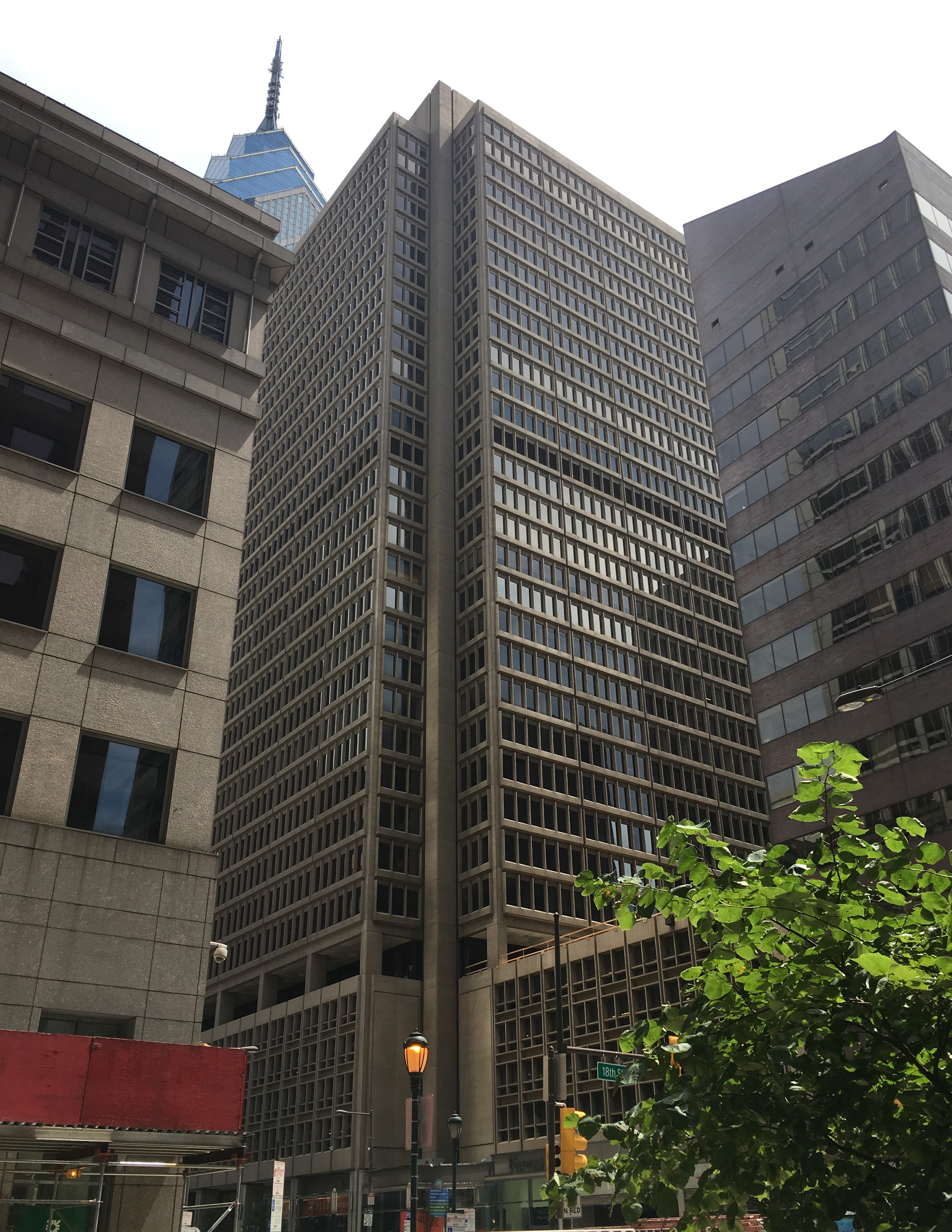

- Location within Philadelphia Location within Pennsylvania Location within the United States

General information
- Status: Completed
- Type: Office
- Location: 1700 Market Street, Philadelphia, Pennsylvania, United States
- Opening: 1968

Height
- Roof: 430 ft (130 m)

Technical details
- Floor count: 32
- Floor area: 841,167 sq ft (78,147.0 m^{2})
- Lifts/elevators: 18

Design and construction
- Architect: Murphy Levy Wurman
- Developer: Transwestern Investment Company
- Main contractor: Tishman Construction

1700 Market is a high-rise building located in the Market West region of Philadelphia, Pennsylvania. The building stands at 430 feet (130 meters) with 32 floors, and was completed in 1968. It is currently tied with Two Logan Square as the 20th-tallest building in Philadelphia. The architect of the building was Murphy Levy Wurman. 1700 Market has the distinction of being the tallest building in Philadelphia built during the 1960s.

1700 Market is a 32-story, Class A trophy office building totaling 841,172 square feet located in the heart of Center City, Philadelphia. Sitting on 1.39 acres, the property also includes a five-story; seven hundred and thirty-five (735) space parking garage. The lower level contains retail services, building storage, and office areas. Positioned approximately two blocks from City Hall and two blocks from Rittenhouse Square, 1700 Market Street boasts the quintessential “main and main” location in the City of Philadelphia. Built in 1969 by Charles Luckman & Associates, the superstructure is cast-in-place, waffle-slab construction with precast concrete panels. Precast curtain wall concrete panels contain punch-outs with anodized single-glazed tinted glazing

== See also ==
- List of tallest buildings in Philadelphia
- Buildings and architecture of Philadelphia
