= G. Fred DiBona Jr. Building =

Federal building in Philadelphia

G. Fred DiBona, Jr. Building
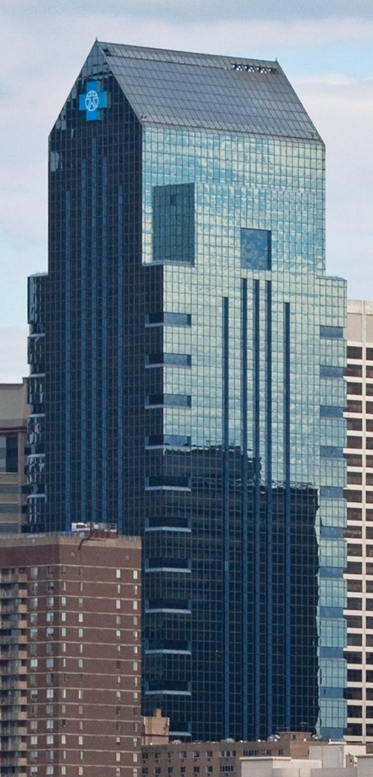

- Location within Philadelphia G. Fred DiBona Jr. Building (Pennsylvania) G. Fred DiBona Jr. Building (the United States)

General information
- Status: Completed
- Type: Office
- Location: 1901 Market Street, Philadelphia, Pennsylvania, United States
- Coordinates: 39.9538°N 75.1719°W
- Construction started: 1988
- Opening: 1990
- Owner: Independence Blue Cross

Height
- Roof: 625 ft (191 m)

Technical details
- Floor count: 45
- Floor area: 761,000 sq ft (70,700 m^{2})

Design and construction
- Architect: WZMH Architects

The G. Fred DiBona Jr. Building, formerly known as the Blue Cross-Blue Shield Tower or IBX Tower, is a skyscraper in Philadelphia, Pennsylvania housing the headquarters of Independence Blue Cross (the Blue Cross-Blue Shield-affiliated organization in the five-county Philadelphia area). The tower, built between 1988 and 1990, was designed by WZMH Architects, who also designed the CN Tower in Toronto, Ontario, Canada. It was renamed in 2005 after the company's president and CEO, who died of a brain tumor at age 53.

Construction of the building consists of a steel skeleton surrounding a reinforced concrete core, similar to the construction of the new Comcast Center. The exterior is all blue glass except for granite accents at the base on the eastern and western facades and granite columns at the main entrance. It is currently the eighth-tallest building in Philadelphia.

The building was originally intended to have a twin tower just to its west but the office-space requirements of the company ultimately ended plans for it. That lot remained vacant until an apartment building was built on it around 2015–2016.

Alain Robert, the famous "French Spider-Man", scaled the building to the 44th floor in 1997, two years after the back-lit Blue Cross logo was added to the building's pediment.

== See also ==
- List of tallest buildings in Philadelphia
