= 1616 Walnut Street Building =

- U.S. National Register of Historic Places
- Philadelphia Register of Historic Places
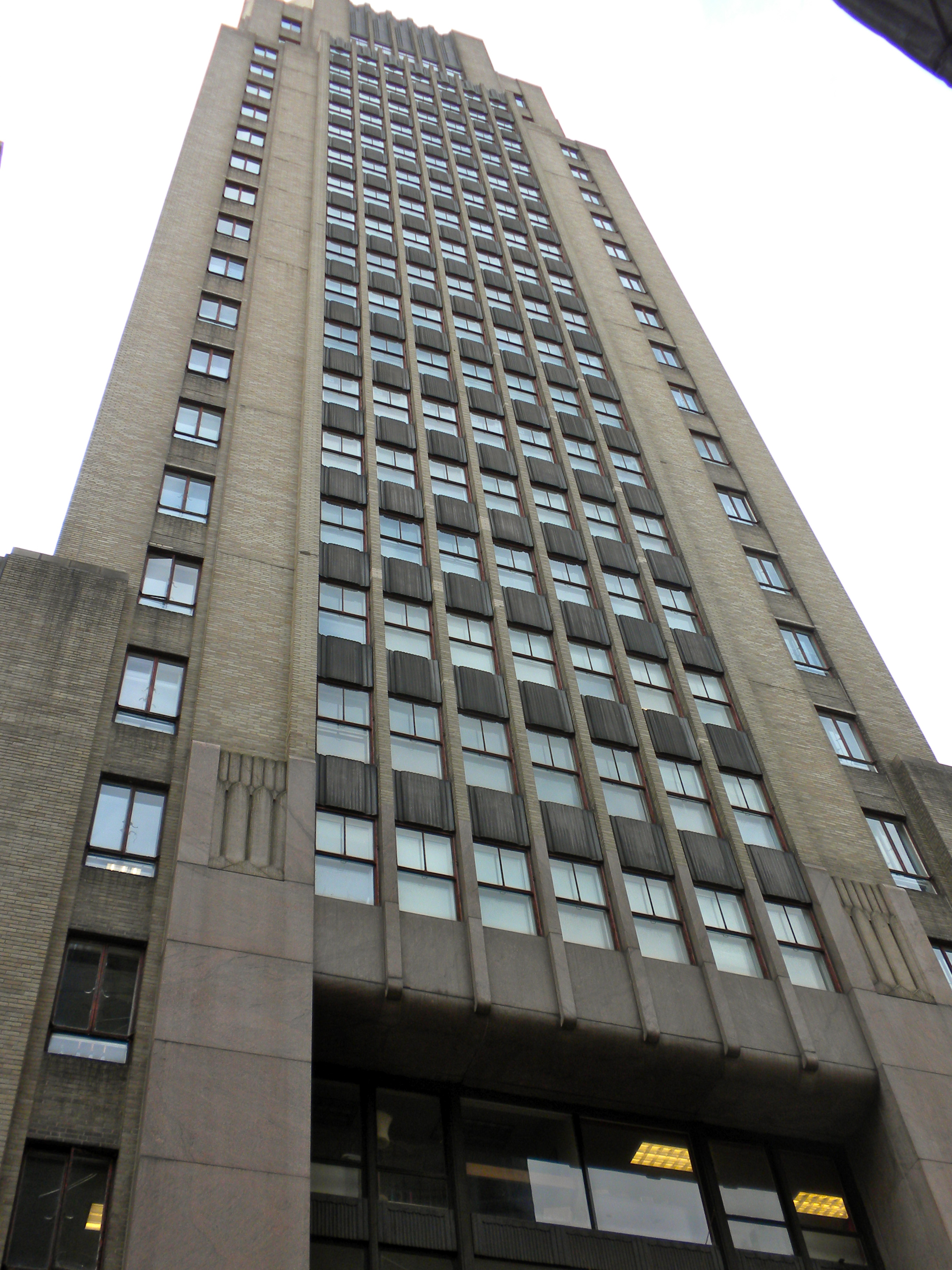
- The 1616 Walnut Street Building in Center City Philadelphia

- Location within Philadelphia Location within Pennsylvania Location within the United States
- Location: 1616 Walnut Street, Philadelphia, Pennsylvania
- Coordinates: 39°56′59″N 75°10′7″W
- Area: 1 acre (0.40 ha)
- Built: 1929
- Architect: Tilden, Register & Pepper; Wark & Co.
- NRHP reference No.: 83004247
- Added to NRHP: October 17, 1983

The 1616 Walnut Street Building or 1616 Building is a historic apartment community building in the Center City area of Philadelphia, Pennsylvania. A twenty-four-story building, it stands ninety-four meters tall.

Listed on the Philadelphia Register of Historic Places on January 7, 1982, it was then also listed on the National Register of Historic Places in 1983.

== History and features ==
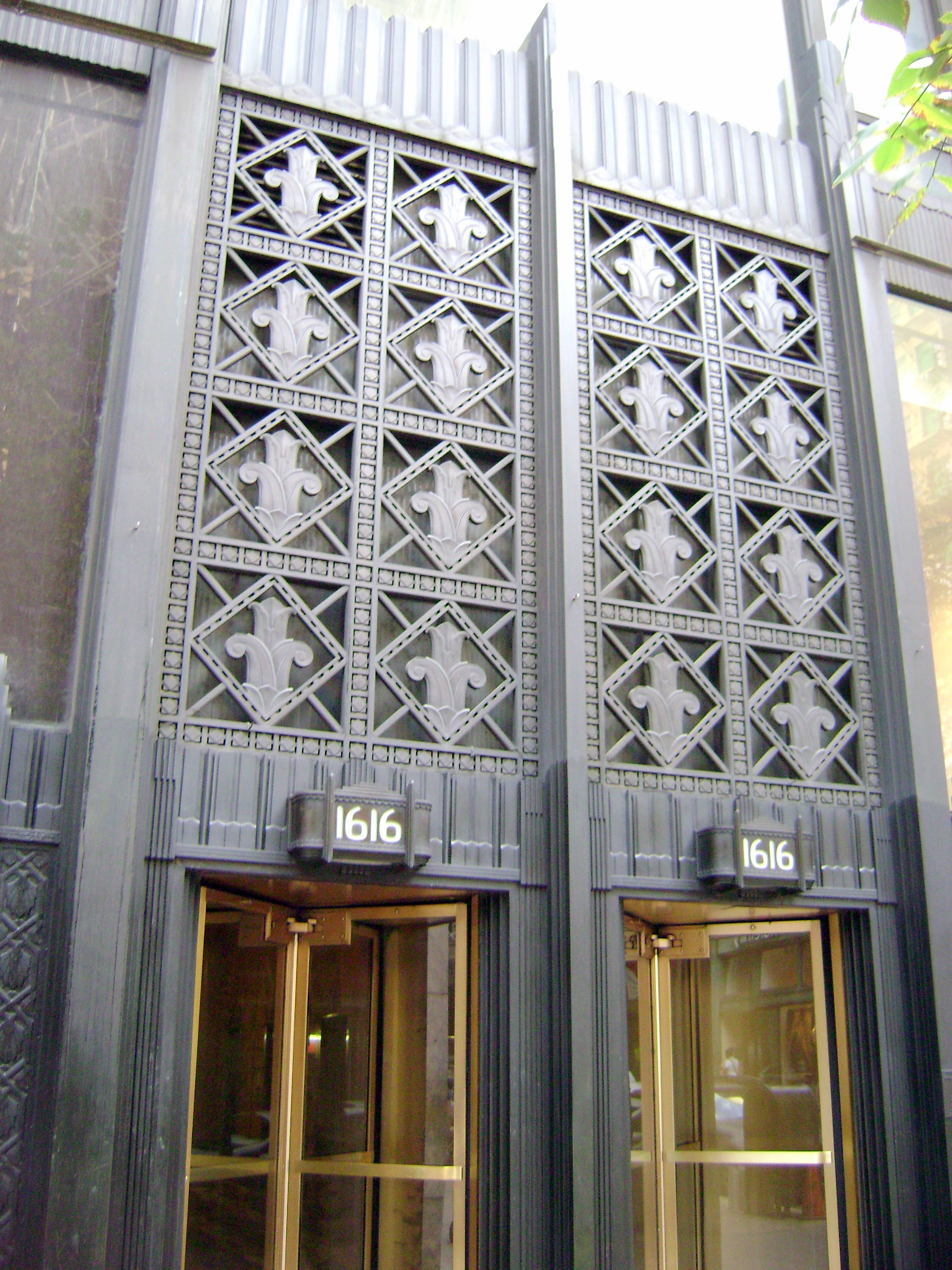
Entrance, 1616 Building

In 1930, the architects received an award for the building's design at the 12th International Buildings Congress in Budapest.

Its five-story parking garage on the Chancellor Street side, part of the original construction, was considered a novelty in 1929.

=== Residential conversion ===
In 2013, 1616 Walnut Street was renamed "Icon" as it underwent an extensive renovation, transforming it from commercial space to an apartment building.

== See also ==
- List of tallest buildings in Philadelphia
