= The St. James =

Luxury residential skyscraper

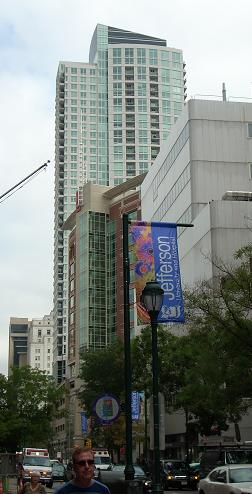
- The St. James seen from Walnut Street in Philadelphia

- Location within Philadelphia The St. James (Pennsylvania) The St. James (the United States)

General information
- Status: Completed
- Type: Residential
- Location: 200 West Washington Square, Philadelphia, Pennsylvania, U.S.
- Coordinates: 39.9477°N 75.154°W
- Construction started: 2001
- Opening: 2004
- Cost: US$80 million
- Owner: 200 West Washington Square LLC

Height
- Roof: 498 ft (152 m)

Technical details
- Floor count: 45

Design and construction
- Architects: Solomon Cordwell Buenz and Associates; Bower Lewis Thrower
- Developer: St. James Associates Joint Venture

The St. James is a luxury residential skyscraper in Washington Square West, Philadelphia, Pennsylvania, United States. The 498 feet (152 m), 45-story high-rise stands along Walnut Street and Washington Square and is the 17th tallest building in Philadelphia as of 2025.

The Chicago-style, glass-and-concrete skyscraper incorporated into its design several historic 19th-century buildings that lined Walnut Street. These buildings included three Federal-style rowhouses built in 1807 called York Row and the Italianate-style former headquarters of the Philadelphia Savings Fund Society, built in 1868–1869. After lying vacant and neglected for years, the only part of York Row preserved were the rowhouses' facades. Only a back portion of the Philadelphia Savings Fund Society building was demolished, the rest being incorporated as retail and office space.

Developer P&A Associates first attempted to develop the site in 1995, but was delayed because of a lack of investor confidence. When the Philadelphia residential market improved in the late 1990s, St. James Associates Joint Venture, a joint venture of P&A Associates and others, began construction in November 2001. The high-rise building, completed in 2004, features 306 units, with each but the studio apartments having a private balcony. Its amenities include a 60 feet (18 m) swimming pool, a private courtyard, and a nine-story parking garage that makes up the base of the building.

== History ==
=== PSFS headquarters and York Row ===
The site of The St. James was formerly occupied by a group of historic 19th-century buildings that lined Walnut Street in the Washington Square West neighborhood in Center City, Philadelphia, Pennsylvania. The most notable of these was the former headquarters of the Philadelphia Savings Fund Society (PSFS). Designed in 1868 by Addison Hutton, the granite-faced Italianate-style building was the second headquarters building that PSFS had built. Construction began on the building on June 13, 1868, and it was opened for business on October 11, 1869. An addition designed by Hutton was added in 1885, and another designed by Frank Furness in 1895. The building served as the PSFS headquarters until 1932 when the company moved to the PSFS Building on Market Street.

The other buildings are a group of three brick three-story rowhouses called York Row. Built in 1807 in the Federal style, they are an early example of speculative housing development. York Row was built at a time when Philadelphia's population was shifting westward, away from the Delaware River.

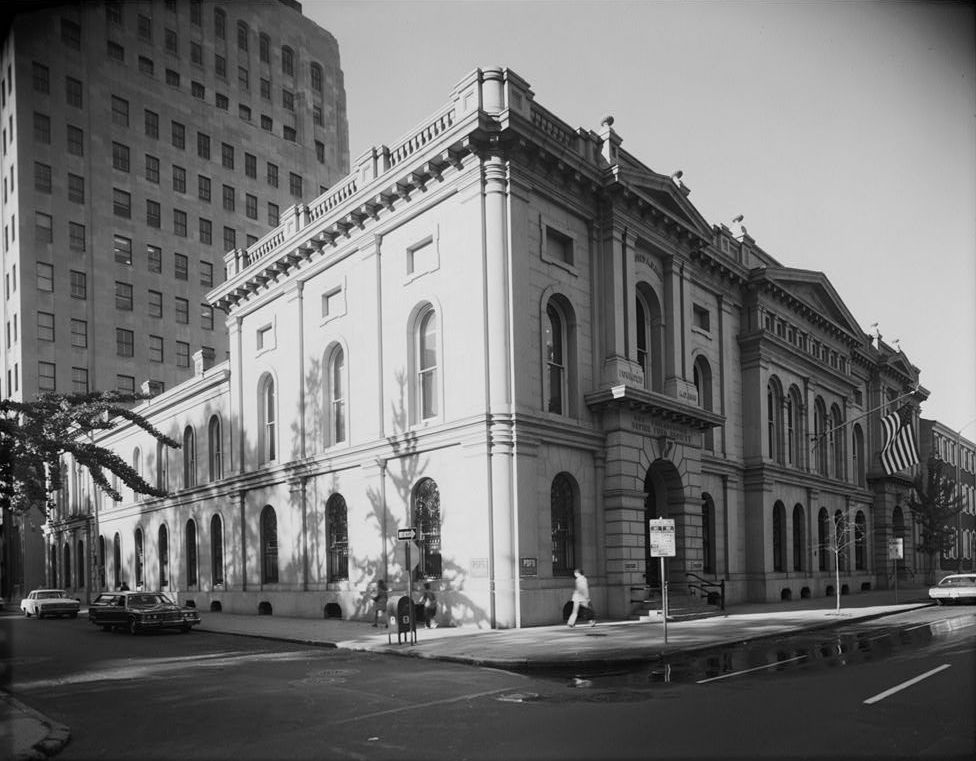
The PSFS headquarters building in the 1970s with York Row on the far right

The buildings were bought for US$4.7 million(equivalent to $12,795,000 in 2025) in 1988 by real estate investor Samuel A. Rappaport. Rappaport, who made a fortune by buying, improving, and then selling run-down properties, announced in 1989 that he planned to turn the building into his own personal headquarters and add a glass-enclosed ballroom on its top. Rappaport also planned to have an apartment in one of the York Row houses. However, like many other Rappaport-owned buildings, they ended up being left vacant and neglected, becoming a target for vandals and the homeless.

Rappaport died in 1994, and in January 1995 developer P&A Associates announced its agreement to buy the properties from his estate. The developer also disclosed plans to build a luxury residential tower at the site. The plan called for dismantling part of Furness's additions to the PSFS headquarters, which would serve as the tower's lobby. The York Row houses would have been completely demolished. The plan was controversial as preservationists wanted the buildings to remain unchanged. P&A Associates met with representatives of the Preservation Alliance for Greater Philadelphia and in February 1995 advanced a new plan that would preserve most of the PSFS headquarters and the York Row facade. The new plan, which was approved by the Philadelphia Historical Commission, included renovating the PSFS headquarters and converting it into restaurant and office space. The York Row building interiors had been stripped of everything except for one fireplace mantle and could not be restored. P&A Associates would instead preserve the front facade of the houses, back to the roof ridge line.

=== Construction and post-construction ===
After its announcement in 1995, the project stalled because P&A Associates was unable to obtain financing. Investors were skeptical about the success potential for luxury residential apartments outside the Rittenhouse Square neighborhood in Center City. In 1998, developer Carl Dranoff, from Narbeth Pa, announced his firm was considering developing the block on Washington Square (described as “long-neglected”) into a 35-story rental property, including rehabbing the “derelict” PSFS Bank and York row houses. As part of his financial package, Dranoff would use “tax increment financing” (TIF) approved by the Philadelphia City Council. The complex, to be named St. James Court, would be the first new Philadelphia high rise since 1987. In March 1999, Chicago-based developer the Barton Group announced its plan to build a 37-story, 322-unit luxury residential tower. The Barton Group's plan would also incorporate the PSFS headquarters building and York Row into the tower.

At the end of the 1990s, Philadelphia was experiencing a condominium boom, with more than 70 Center City office and manufacturing buildings being converted into rental and condominium apartments between 1998 and 2004. With the residential market in Center City growing, P&A Associates found financing by going into a partnership with real estate firm Boston Financial to fund its planned residential tower. Around the same time, the Barton Group ended its intentions with the site and sold its interest in the property to P&A Associates and Boston Financial. The tower announced by P&A Associates and Boston Financial would be a 300-unit luxury rental tower called St. James Court, named after an adjacent street. The high-rise would still incorporate the preservation efforts for the 19th-century buildings it agreed to in 1995.

P&A Associates received final approval from the city zoning board and the historical commission in August 1999, but continued to seek more financing, which it was able to secure from Corus Bank of Chicago in September 2001. To develop the tower, now called The St. James, P&A Associates formed the St. James Associates Joint Venture with Clark Realty Capital LLC and Lend Lease Real Estate Investments, which represented an undisclosed client. With financial backing from its partners and tax breaks for new residential construction passed in 2000, construction began on November 28, 2001. BACE Construction (Philadelphia based) was awarded the construction of the project. . Ground was broken for the now 45-story residential tower and the building would open in fall 2003.

Philadelphia had not seen any residential high-rise development since the 1980s, and The St. James was one of the first to begin construction in the city, preceded only by the 16-story Residences at the Dockside, which broke ground in 2000. It became Philadelphia's largest residential project.

In 2004, P&A reported that over 100 units of the 306 available were leased out and they were pleased with the leasing activity and monthly rents from $1,500 to $6,000 (except penthouses). Construction was completed later that month, with finishing touches added later in the year.

By 2005, in a move that surprised many real estate experts, the building was put up for sale where it was expected it would obtain a selling price between $122(equivalent to $201,116,000 in 2025) to $137 million(equivalent to $225,843,000 in 2025). P&A and Clark Realty, operating as 700 Walnut LP offered the property in a complex but reasonably common method of major real estate purchases, subject to a buy-sell agreement with 700 Walnut’s anonymous equity partner. In this scenario, 700 Walnut would buy the property from the unknown partner and immediately sell it to the new buyer. The building was purchased by Clarion Partners for approximately $137 million.

In 2022, the building, now 95% leased even with the precarious effects of the Covid lockdown, was put up for sale and expected to retrieve in excess of $200 million. In December, Clarion announced it had sold the St. James to an undisclosed buyer for $220 million (over $700,000/unit), one of the largest apartment building sales in Philadelphia history. The new owner of the St. James is 220 West Washington Sq, LLC, according to Philadelphia County records.

== Building ==
The St. James is a 45-story, high-rise luxury residential skyscraper in Center City. At 498 feet (152 m) tall, it is the 15th tallest building in Philadelphia. The US$80 million, Chicago-style high-rise was designed by Solomon Cordwell Buenz & Associates Inc. with assistance by architectural firm Bower Lewis Thrower. Located between 8th Street, Walnut Street, St. James Street, and Washington Square, The St. James stands two blocks from Independence Hall. The glass and concrete skyscraper's east and west facade is split between a curved wall, a squared-off wing, and a strip of blue glass that separates them.

The St. James contains 415,790 square feet (39,000 m^{2}) of residential and commercial space. This includes 8,290 square feet (770 m^{2}) of office space, 14,500 square feet (1,300 m^{2}) of retail space, and 393,000 square feet (37,000 m^{2}) of residential space. The 306 residential units feature 9 feet (2.7 m) ceilings and floor-to-ceiling windows. The building features a four-pipe heating and air-conditioning system, and every unit, except for the studio apartments, has a private balcony. Building amenities include an 11th-floor health club and a 60 feet (18 m) swimming pool.

The first nine floors of The St. James house private parking for building residents. The street-level retail floor is occupied by a Starbucks and an Oceanaire seafood restaurant. Along Walnut Street, The St. James incorporated the front facades of the York Row houses, while the rest of the buildings were demolished. The main tower is set 15 feet (4.6 m) from the York Row facades to preserve the Row's original look. All but the rear wing of the PSFS headquarters building was incorporated into the tower. The demolished portion of the PSFS building was converted into a hidden courtyard for residents.

Preservationists were critical of how the York Row houses were preserved. Calling them "facadectomies", vice president of the Preservation Alliance for Greater Philadelphia J. Randall Cotton felt that saving the facades did not preserve the essence of the buildings, but that it was better than nothing. Cotton said, "At the eyeball level, it will give something of the coherence of the Philadelphia cityscape, which is a human scale. The beauty of Philadelphia is that its lots were 20 to 25 feet, which allowed for a door and two windows. It's a falsehood to put a big building behind them. But it's preferable to demolition." The Philadelphia Inquirer architecture critic Inga Saffron was critical of the parking garage on the lower floors, saying it "detracts from [The St. James's] crisp, vertical lines and bumps clumsily against the historic buildings. The garage also makes the tower feel distant from the life of the city." The St. James has won several awards, including the 2006 National Association of Home Builders awards for Best Luxury Rental Apartment Primary Market and Best High-Rise Rental Apartment.

== See also ==
- List of tallest buildings in Philadelphia
