= PNC Bank Building (Philadelphia) =

High-rise office building in Philadelphia, Pennsylvania

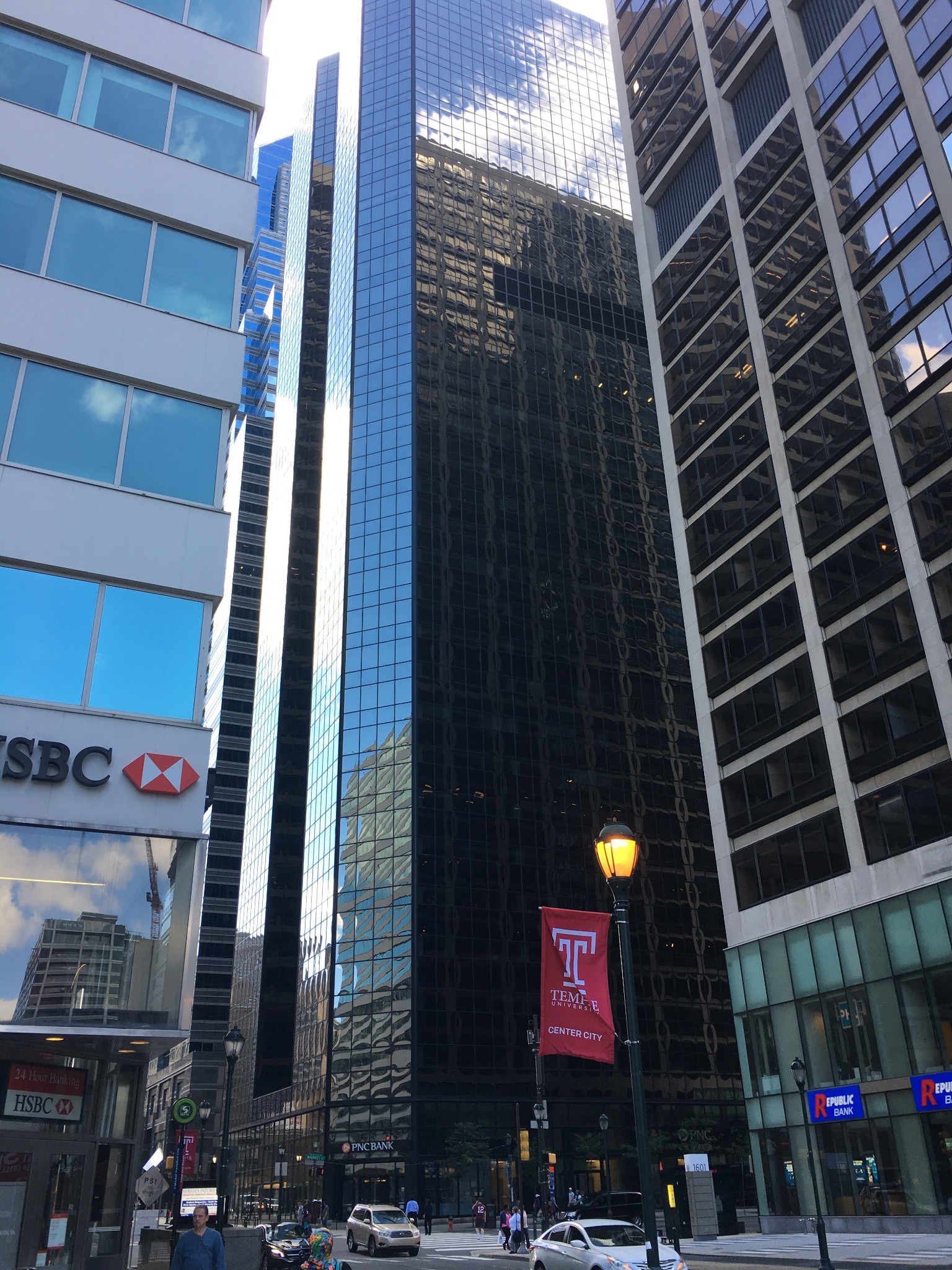
- the PNC Bank Building in 2009

- Location within Philadelphia PNC Bank Building (Philadelphia) (Pennsylvania) PNC Bank Building (Philadelphia) (the United States)

General information
- Status: Completed
- Type: modernistic
- Location: 1600 Market Street; Philadelphia, Pennsylvania
- Coordinates: 39.9525°N 75.1673°W
- Completed: 1983
- Owner: American Real Estate Partners

Height
- Roof: 491 ft (150 m)

Technical details
- Floor count: 39
- Floor area: 825,868 sq ft (76,725.6 m^{2})

Design and construction
- Architects: Skidmore, Owings & Merrill LLP
- Developer: Don Pulver

The PNC Bank Building is a high-rise office building located in the Market West neighborhood of Center City, Philadelphia. Constructed in 1983, it is 491 feet (150 m) in height and has 39 stories. It houses offices for PNC Financial Services. It was constructed on the site of the Fox Theatre and the Stanley/Stanton/Milgram Theatre.

It is home to a number of businesses, including Cohen Seglias Pallas Greenhall & Furman, PC, Huntington & Franklin, P.C., Philadelphia office of Schnader Harrison Segal & Lewis, Zarella Law Office LLC, Stifel Nicolaus Weisel's Investment Banking group, BCD m&i., and the Tax Warriors of Drucker & Scaccetti, P.C.

== Site ==
The PNC Bank Building is located at 1600 Market Street in the Market West neighborhood of Center City, Philadelphia. It occupies the northeast corner of a city block bounded by Market Street to the north, 16th Street to the east, Chestnut Street to the south, and 17th Street to the west. The land lot occupies 35,095.5 square feet (3,260.48 m^{2}) with a frontage of 177 feet (54 m) on Market and 16th Streets.

The building shares the city block with the Liberty Place skyscraper complex, with One Liberty Place to the west, Two Liberty Place to the south, and the Shops at Liberty Place to the southwest. Other nearby buildings include Centre Square to the east, One Penn Center to the north, and the BNY Mellon Center to the northwest.

== History ==
Provident Mutual Life Insurance Co. was a former tenant of the building. In 1996, the New York-based real estate investment management firm Yarmouth Group oversaw a renovation for the new owners of the building purchased two years before.

PNC Bank formally moved its regional headquarters and PNC Asset Management Group national headquarters to the 1600 Market Street building in 1997, occupying 15 floors.

== See also ==
- List of tallest buildings in Philadelphia
