= 1706 Rittenhouse =

Historical building in Philadelphia

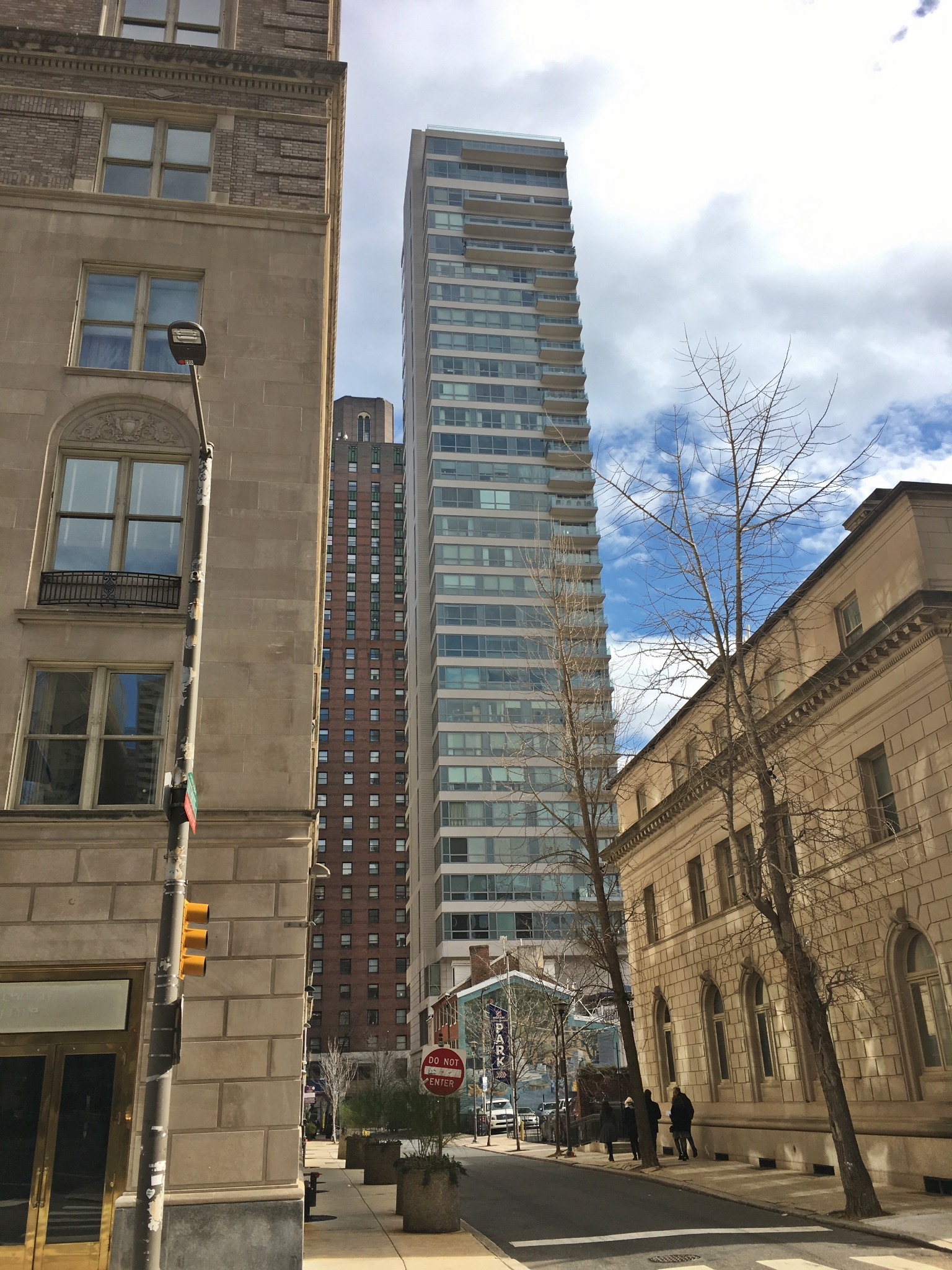

General information
- Status: Completed
- Type: Condo
- Location: Philadelphia, Pennsylvania, United States
- Construction started: 2006
- Completed: 2010
- Opening: 2010
- Cost: $140 million
- Management: Theodore R Aronson (money manager)

Height
- Roof: 401 feet (122 m)

Technical details
- Floor count: 33 above ground, 4 below ground

1706 Rittenhouse is a private residence in Rittenhouse Square, Philadelphia, Pennsylvania. It is known for being an expensive residential building, with many units costing over $3.9 million.

== Residents ==
The majority of the residents have a net worth of at least $10 million. The condo is home to surgeons, pediatricians, real estate magnates, CEOs, and professional athletes.

=== Notable residents ===
- Cliff Lee - professional baseball player for the Philadelphia Phillies

== See also ==
- List of tallest buildings in Philadelphia
