= The W Philadelphia and Element Philadelphia =

Skyscraper in Center City, Philadelphia, Pennsylvania

Coordinates: 39.9511°N 75.1653°W

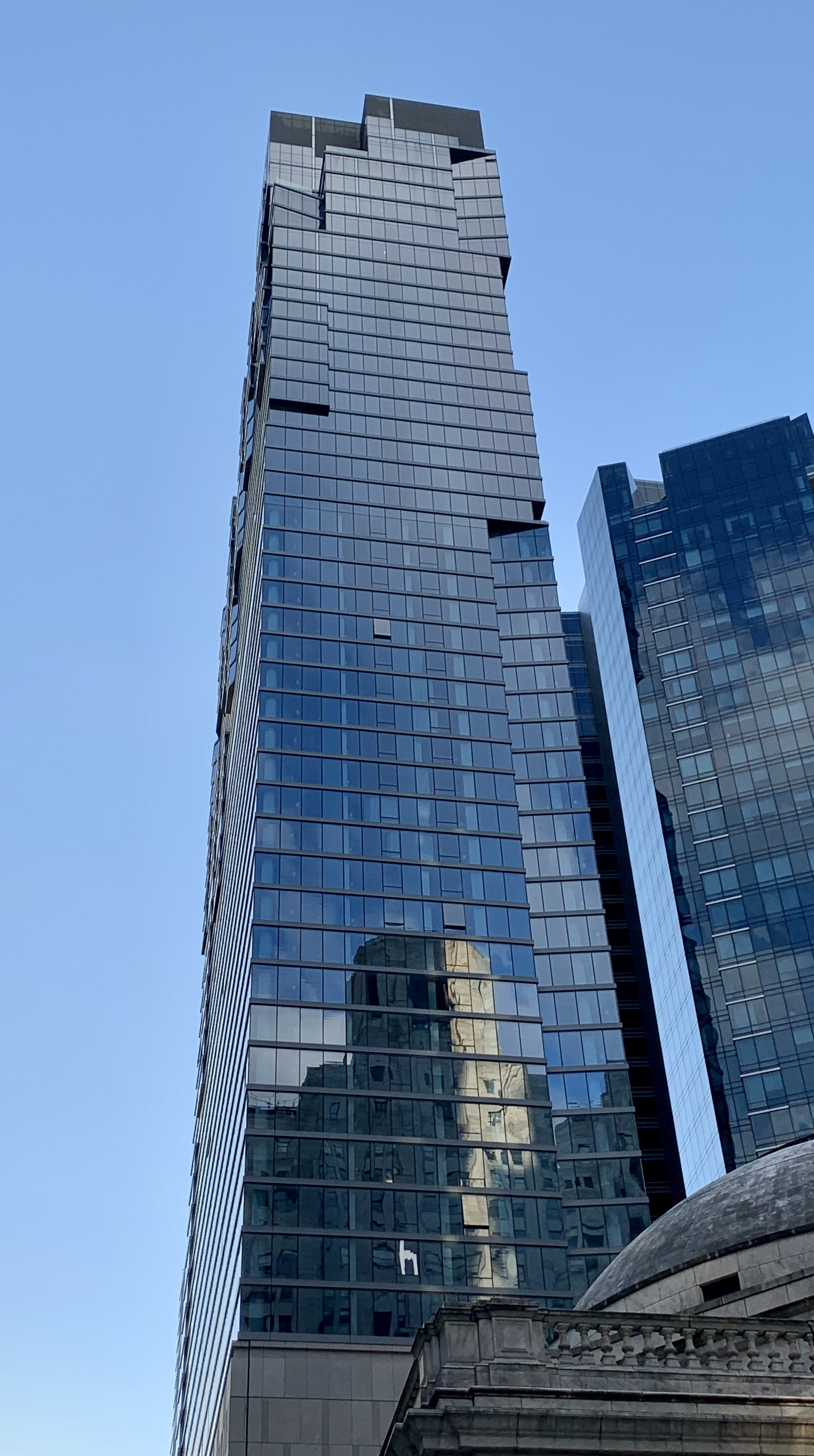
- Interactive map of the The W Philadelphia and Element Philadelphia area

General information
- Location: 1441 Chestnut Street, Philadelphia, United States
- Construction started: 2015
- Completed: 2020
- Owner: Chestlen Development

Height
- Height: 617 ft (188 m)

Technical details
- Material: Concrete
- Floor count: 51

Design and construction
- Architect: NELSON Worldwide
- Engineer: O'Donnell & Naccarato

Other information
- Number of rooms: 755 (295 W; 460 Element)
- Parking: Yes

The W Philadelphia and Element Philadelphia is a 51-story skyscraper in the Center City neighborhood of Philadelphia, Pennsylvania. The building contains two hotels, the Element Philadelphia, a brand by Westin Hotels, and the W Philadelphia, a brand of W Hotels, both of which are subsidiaries of Marriot International. At 617 ft (188 m), it is the 9th-tallest building in Philadelphia, and 12th-tallest building in Pennsylvania, as well as the tallest hotel in Philadelphia.

The building is built on the site of demolished One Meridian Plaza, which was heavily damaged after a fire in 1991, and later demolished in 1999. The building is located right next to Philadelphia City Hall, which puts it at the heart of Center City, with very convenient access to the various SEPTA lines and various Philadelphia landmarks.

== Architecture ==
The building's two hotels have two separate entrances, both located on Chestnut Street, while the parking garage is located on S 15th Street. The Element contains 460 rooms, while The W contains 295 rooms, totaling 755 rooms. Near the top of the tower, there is a large LED W sign that lights up at night, as well as various vertical lights and stepped terraces. The building has a 7-story limestone base, with each hotel entrance having a different design, made up of various materials. The design of the façade by the entrances is supposed to pay homage to William Penn's planned city, with a grid-like design. The design of much of the building is supposed to represent many elements of Philadelphia. There is also a restaurant and a retail store enterable from the street.

The W Philadelphia is a part of the more luxurious W Hotels brand, and offers numerous amenities, including a full bar, spa, fitness center, outdoor pool, rooftop terrace, and a 45,000 sq ft (4,200 m^{2}) conference center. On the seventh floor, there is an area known as the WET Deck, which contains the outdoor heated pool, in addition to several cabanas, a firepit, and an outdoor fireplace, all of which are located next to the indoor bar. The floor also contains the Secret Garden, which is decorated with plants, hedges, and various illuminated statues, as well as the AWAY spa, the fitness center, and an outdoor yoga deck. The W also contains The Living Room, an upscale restaurant and social space. There are 12 different kinds of rooms, of which 6 are suites.

The Element Philadelphia is an extended-stay hotel, a part of the upscale Westin Hotels brand, and offers a sky lobby, breakfast area, and fitness center. The second floor includes the fitness center, breakfast area, business center, and lobby. Rooms in the Element all contain kitchens. There are 8 different kinds of rooms, of which 2 are suites. Both hotels are pet-friendly.

== See also ==
- List of tallest buildings in Philadelphia
- List of tallest buildings in Pennsylvania
