= The Laurel =

Building in Philadelphia

The Laurel Rittenhouse Square
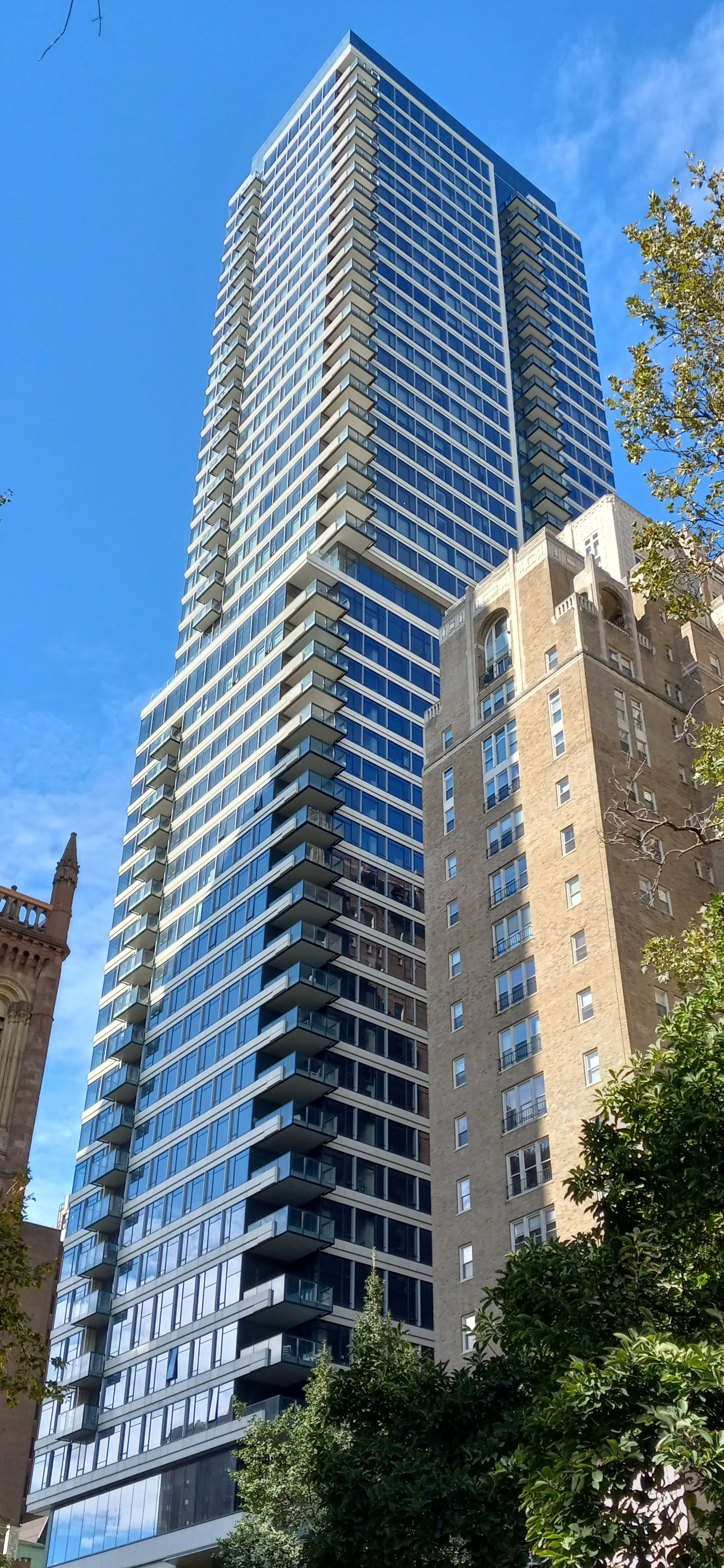

General information
- Status: Completed
- Type: Mixed-use
- Location: 1911 Walnut Street, Philadelphia, Pennsylvania, U.S.
- Estimated completion: Mid-2022
- Management: Southern Land Company

Technical details
- Floor count: 48

Design and construction
- Architect: Solomon Cordwell Buenz

The Laurel is a luxury residential skyscraper in the Rittenhouse Square neighborhood of Philadelphia, Pennsylvania that cost $350 million to build and is 604 feet (184 meters) tall. The building contains condominiums, luxury apartments, and retail space. The residential tower was developed by Southern Land Company, a national real estate development company based in Nashville, Tennessee.

The Laurel includes 66 condominiums and 187 luxury apartments spanning 48 floors. The building also features 43,000 square feet of retail space that wraps around Walnut, Sansom and 20th streets. The retail space is on the building's first two floors. The building includes onsite and offsite parking with partnerships with nearby parking garages. Condominiums start in the low $2 million and go as high as $25 million for the penthouses. The Laurel includes multiple amenity areas for all residents, with condominium owners having access to the 26th-floor featuring a spa, meeting areas, and fitness amenities.

The Laurel is Philadelphia's tallest residential skyscraper and the city's 10th-tallest overall skyscraper.
