= Five Penn Center =

36-story highrise in downtown Philadelphia, Pennsylvania

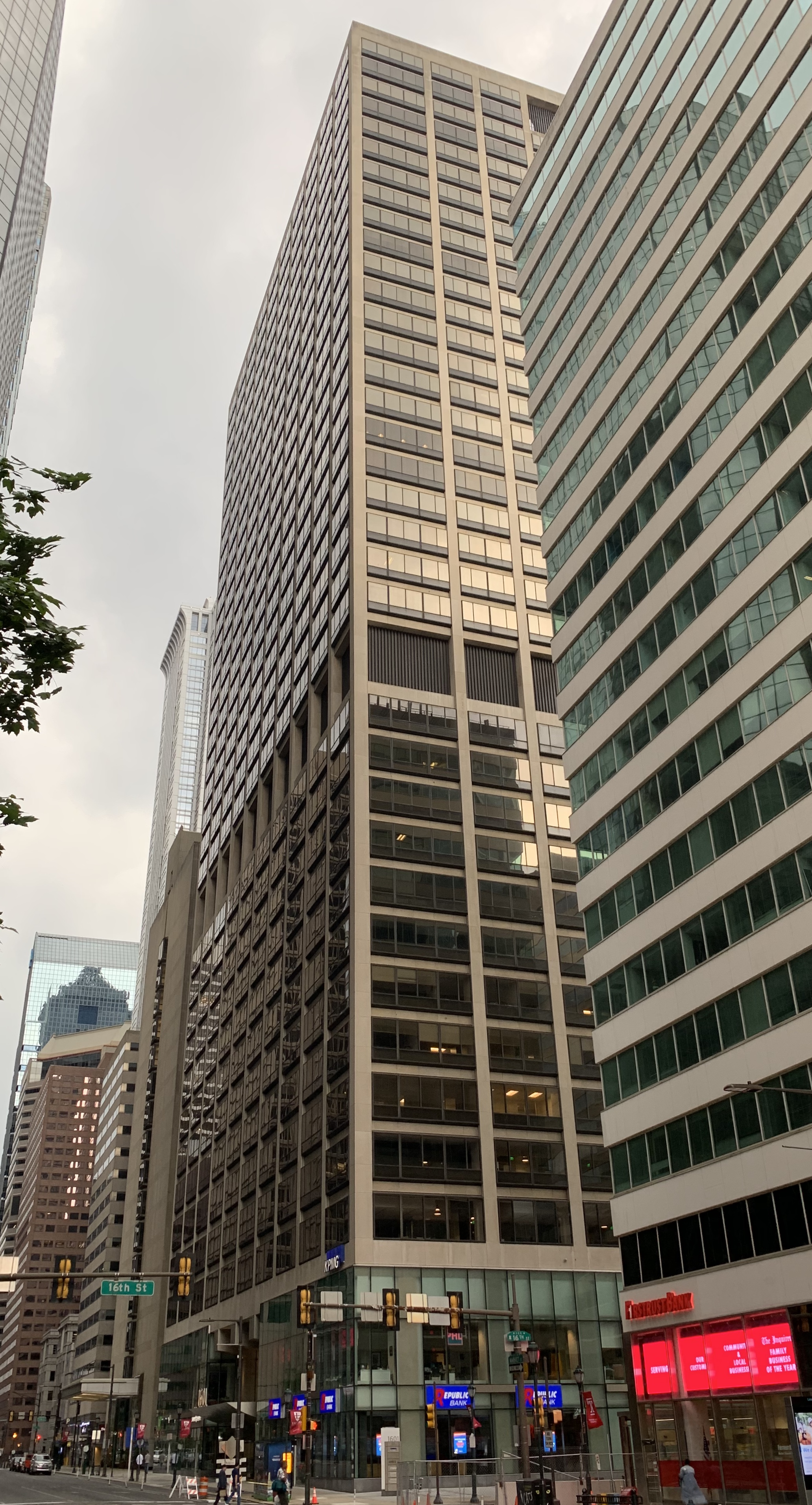
- Five Penn Center in Center City Philadelphia

- Location within Philadelphia Location within Pennsylvania Location within the United States

General information
- Status: Completed
- Type: Office
- Location: 1601 Market Street, Philadelphia, Pennsylvania, U.S.
- Coordinates: 39.9531°N 75.1674°W
- Opening: 1970
- Owner: APF Properties

Height
- Roof: 490 ft (150 m)

Technical details
- Floor count: 36
- Floor area: 681,289 sq ft (63,293.8 m^{2})

Design and construction
- Architects: Emery Roth & Sons

Five Penn Center is a 36-story highrise in Center City Philadelphia. It is part of the Penn Center complex designed by Edmund Bacon. The building was one of the tallest in the city until the high rise building boom of the late 1980s and early 1990s and is connected via underground concourse to Suburban Station, as are all buildings in the complex.

It was designed by Emery Roth & Sons and Vincent G. Kling (who also designed the Philadelphia Mint).

In 1986, several buildings of the Penn Center complex were renamed to their street addresses and Five Penn was no exception. Looking to get an edge up, being the largest of the Penn Center buildings and directly across Market Street from One Liberty Place, which was rising at the time, building landlords offered rental space at $16.01 a year per square foot, a marketing ploy for the building based on its address, 1601.

Today, major tenants include The Neat Company, KPMG and WeWork. The building's lobby underwent remodeling in the summer of 2006.

== See also ==
- List of tallest buildings in Philadelphia
- Tallest buildings in the United States
- List of skyscrapers
- World's tallest structures
