= Drake Hotel (Philadelphia) =

- U.S. National Register of Historic Places
- Philadelphia Register of Historic Places
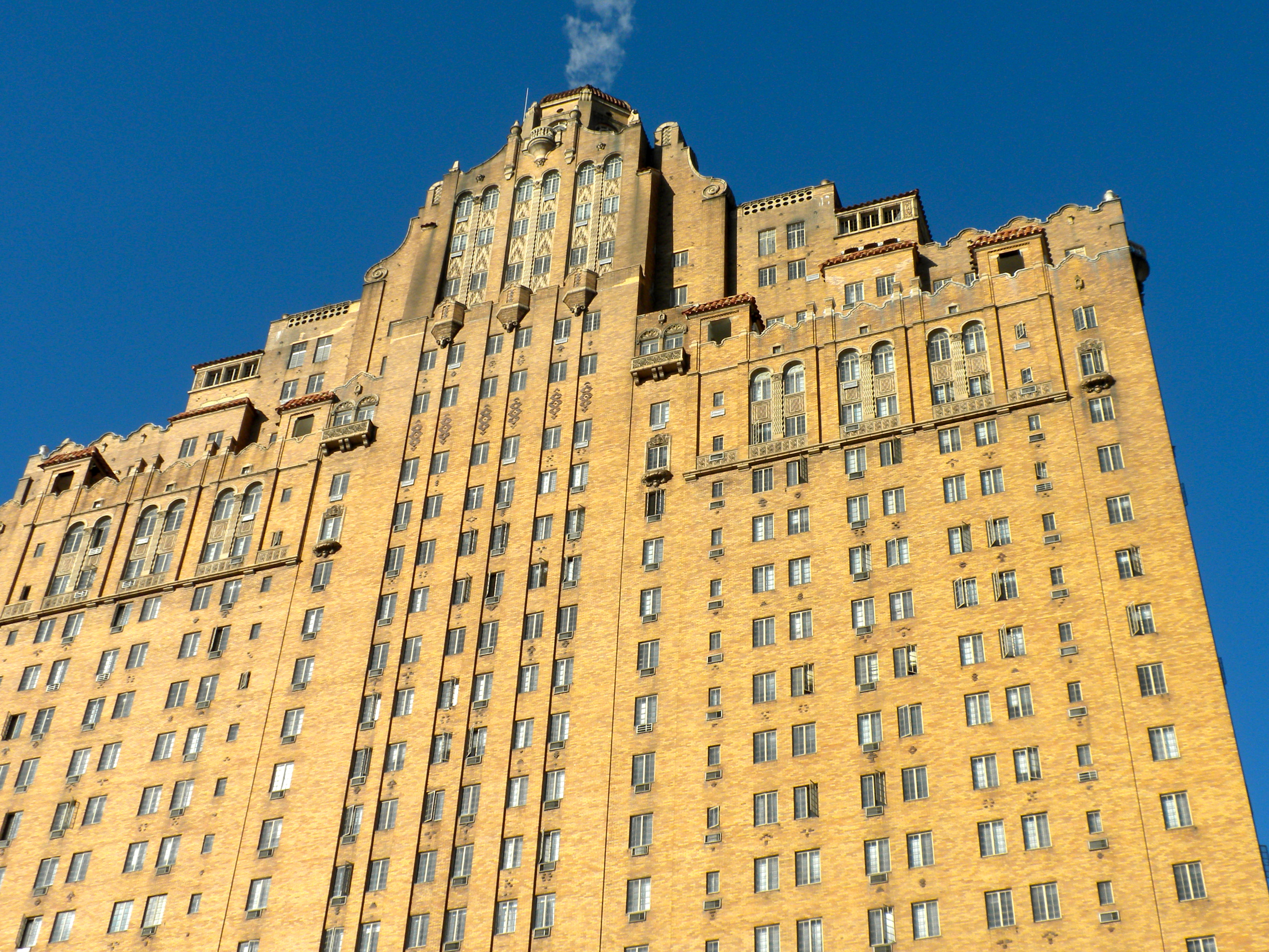
- Drake Hotel in February 2010

- Location within Philadelphia Location within Pennsylvania Location within the United States
- Location: 1512-1514 Spruce St., Philadelphia, Pennsylvania
- Coordinates: 39°56′49″N 75°10′3″W
- Built: 1928
- Built by: Murphy, Quigley
- Architects: Ritter & Shay, Eric Fisher Wood
- Architectural style: Art Deco, Spanish Baroque
- NRHP reference No.: 78002446

Significant dates
- Added to NRHP: September 18, 1978
- Designated PRHP: October 6, 1977

The Drake Hotel, a historic 375-foot-tall, 33-story luxury hotel located at 1512–1514 Spruce Street at the corner of S. Hicks Street between S. 15th and S. 16th Streets in the Rittenhouse Square neighborhood of Philadelphia, Pennsylvania was built in 1928–29 by the Murphy, Quigley Company and was designed by the architectural firm of Ritter and Shay in the Art Deco style with Spanish Baroque terra cotta ornamentation on themes surrounding Sir Francis Drake, including "dolphins, shells, sailing vessels and globes." The building is topped by a terra cotta dome.

The building was originally proposed to be 28-stories, and the demolition work took place in April 1928. The first steel column was placed on site on September 1, 1928 and just four months later stunt reporter Vivian Shirley went to the top of the unfinished building on January 29, 1929. It was originally scheduled to open in June 1929, but the developers stated it was ready for occupancy on September 11, 1929.

The building was listed on the National Register of Historic Places on September 18, 1978. It was added to the Philadelphia Register of Historic Places on October 6, 1977. In 1998, the building was extensively renovated and converted to condominiums as "The Drake".

In 2016, the building's ballroom was renovated into a two-theater complex by InterAct Theatre Company, who operate the space and share it with PlayPenn, Inis Nua Theatre, Simpatico, and Azuka Theatre. The Proscenium has 121 seats, while the Louis Bluver Theatre is a black box space with a capacity of 65-80 people.

== See also ==
- National Register of Historic Places listings in Center City, Philadelphia
