= BLT Architects =

American architectural firm

Bower Lewis Thrower Architects, Ltd. (BLTa) was an American architectural firm, founded and headquartered in Philadelphia, Pennsylvania, with offices in Atlantic City and Las Vegas. The firm designed, oversaw the renovation, or was the architect of record for numerous projects throughout the Mid-Atlantic states. It merged with Perkins Eastman in 2022.

== Company background ==
BLTa was founded as "Bower & Fradley Architects" in 1961 by John Bower and Fred Fradley. In 1978, the firm was renamed to "Bower Fradley Lewis Thrower Architects." The firm kept this name until 1980 when the title changed to "Bower Lewis Thrower Architects." This was shortened in the late 2000s to BLTa for marketing purposes.

== People ==
- Michael L. Prifti, FAIA, Principal
- Eric M. Rahe, AIA, LEED AP, Principal

== Notable projects ==
=== Residential ===
  - International House Philadelphia(1970) under Bower & Fradley Architects
  - 101 Walnut Street (2007)
  - Symphony House (2007)
  - The Phoenix (2002)
  - Venice Lofts (2007)
  - Alexander (2018)
  - Lincoln Square (2019)
  - Nipper Building
  - The St. James luxury apartments, Philadelphia. Assisted Solomon Cordwell Buenz & Associates

=== Hospitality ===
  - The Borgata Hotel Casino and Spa (2003)
  - Loews Philadelphia Hotel (2000)
  - Reading Terminal Headhouse Marriott (1997)
  - Revel Resort and Casino (2012) (with Arquitectonica)
  - The Bourse
  - Caesars Atlantic City Hotel
  - The St. James (assistant architects)

=== Mixed use and retail ===
  - Amtrak 30th Street Station Rail Yard (2004)
  - DC USA (2008)
  - The Borgata Hotel and Spa Retail Piazza
  - One Theater Square, Newark
  - Forrestal Village, Princeton University

=== Parking and intermodal ===
  - Amtrak 30th Street Station Parking Garage (2004)
  - Philadelphia International Airport Garage (2003)
  - Suburban Station (2006)
  - UPENN Module 6 Utility Plant and Garage (1995)

=== Office ===
  - FMC Tower at Cira Centre South (with Pelli Clarke Pelli)
  - Duane Morris Headquarters (2005)
  - Tower Bridge Corporate Campus (2000)

== Awards and recognition ==
- 2011
  - Top 50 Hotel Design Firms - Building Design+Construction
  - Top 100 Architecture Firms - Building Design+Construction
  - No. 142, Top 200 Architecture Firms - Architectural Record
  - No. 27, Top Design Firms, HA+D Magazine
  - IDP Firm Award - The Intern Development Program Advisory Committee (IDPAC)
- 1970
  - Gold Medal (American Institute of Architects Philadelphia) for International House
