= One Logan Square =

High-rise building in Philadelphia, Pennsylvania

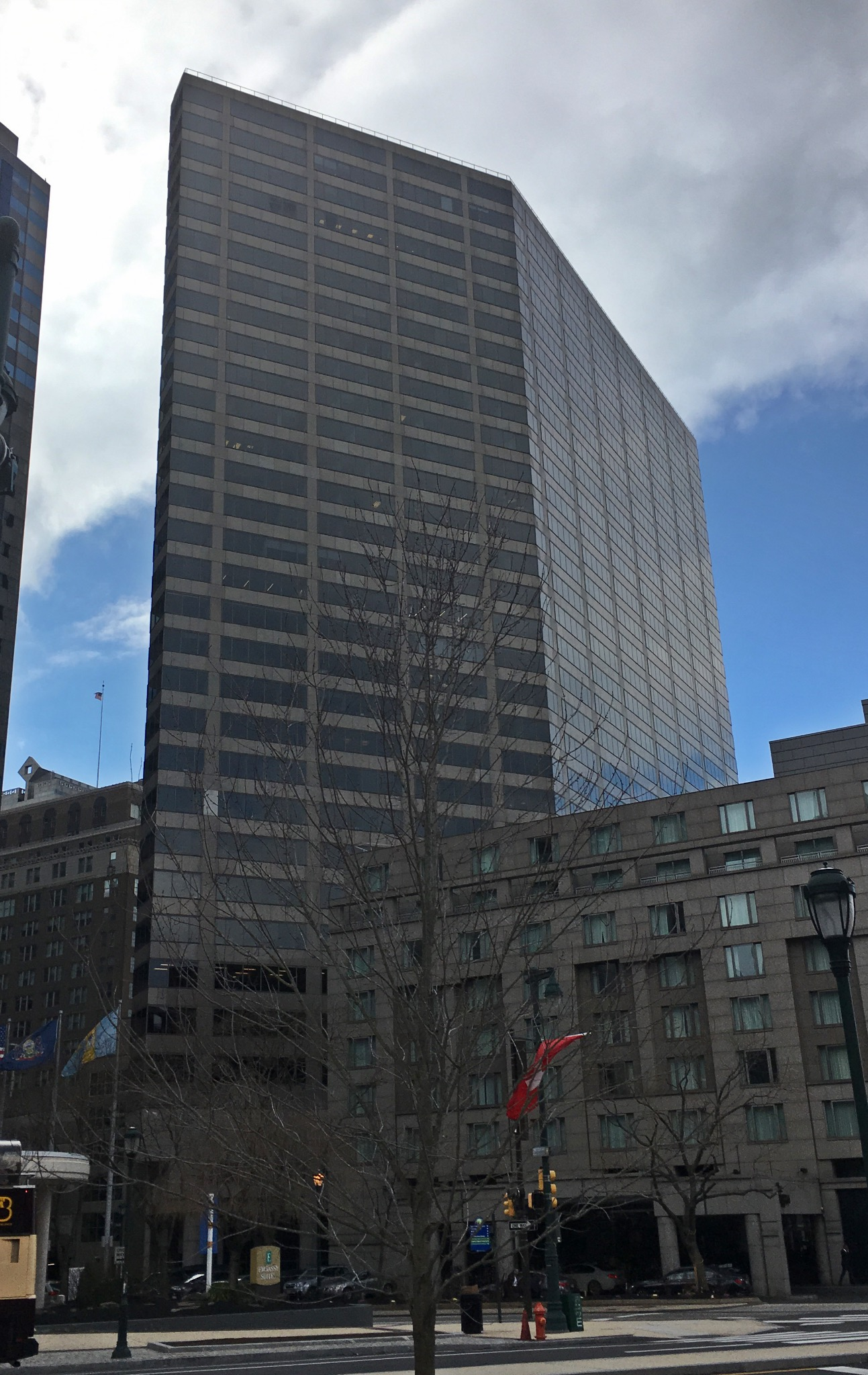

- Location within Philadelphia One Logan Square (Pennsylvania) One Logan Square (the United States)

General information
- Status: Completed
- Type: Office
- Location: 130 North 18th Street, Philadelphia, Pennsylvania, United States
- Coordinates: 39.9564°N 75.17°W
- Construction started: 1979
- Completed: 1983
- Opening: 1983
- Owner: Brandywine Realty Trust

Height
- Roof: 400 ft (120 m)

Technical details
- Floor count: 31

Design and construction
- Architect: Kohn Pedersen Fox Associates PC
- Developer: INA; Urban Investment and Development Co.

One Logan Square is an American high-rise building that is located in the Logan Square neighborhood of Philadelphia, Pennsylvania. The building stands at 400 ft (122 m) with thirty-one floors, and was completed in 1983. The architectural firm responsible for the building's design is Kohn Pedersen Fox Associates PC.

It is currently the 31st-tallest building in Philadelphia.

== History and architectural features ==
This building and accompanying Four Seasons Hotel (now The Logan Hotel) were developed by a joint venture of INA and Urban Investment and Development Co. for $120 million. As the zoning laws at the time prohibited buildings taller than 80 feet facing Logan Square, building the low-rise hotel on the square allowed construction of the office building.

The law firm Morgan, Lewis & Bockius was one of the anchor tenants at the property at construction and received an equity stake as part of its lease agreement.

The Rubenstein Company acquired the building along with Two Logan Square in 1997 from Aetna for $55 million. Brandywine Realty Trust acquired the property as part of its acquisition of Rubenstein's portfolio in 2014.

It is currently the 31st-tallest building in Philadelphia.

== See also ==
- List of tallest buildings in Philadelphia
- Buildings and architecture of Philadelphia
