= Two Logan Square =

Highrise office building in downtown Philadelphia

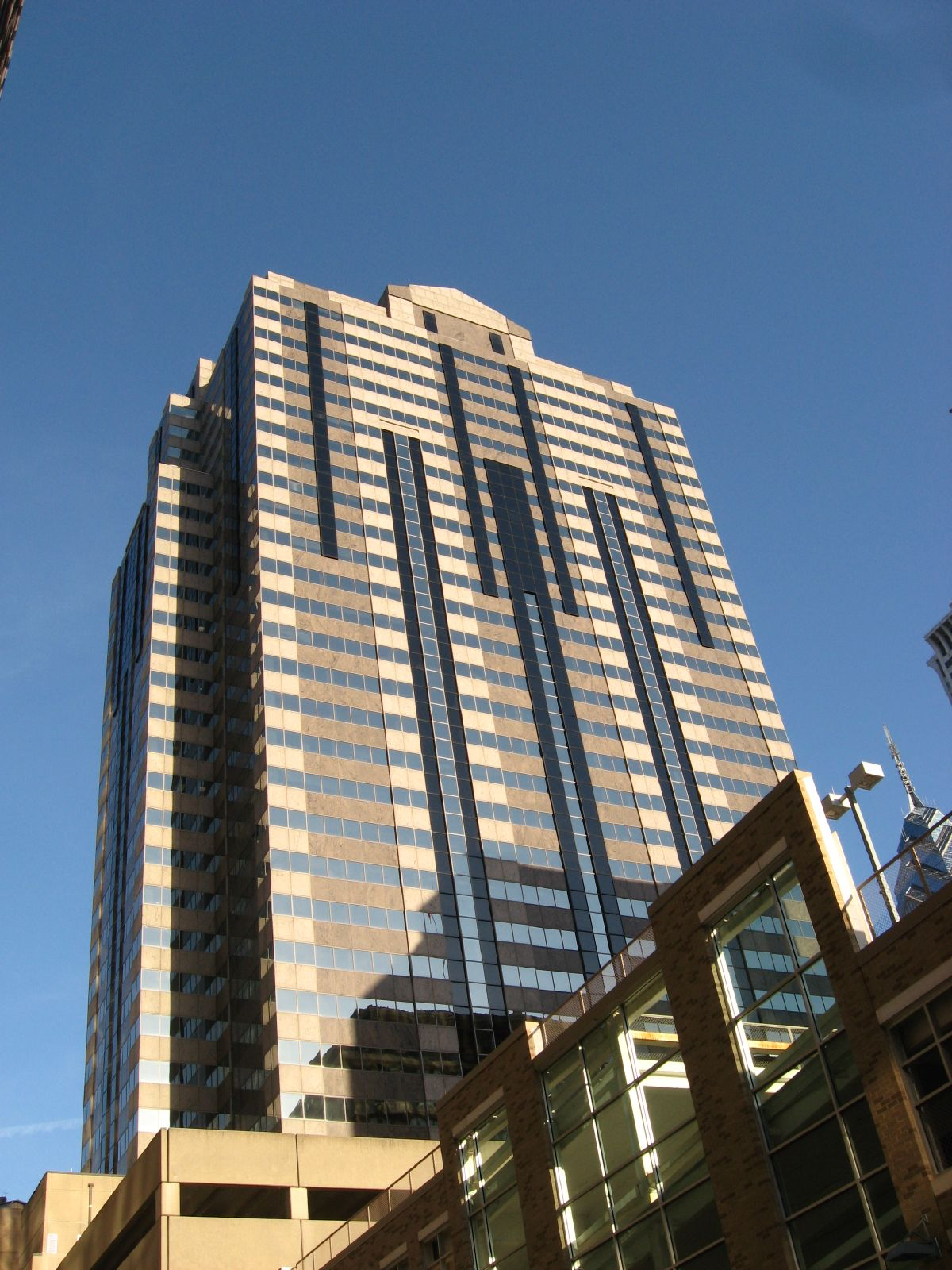
- Two Logan Square in Center City Philadelphia

- Location within Philadelphia Location within Pennsylvania Location within the United States

General information
- Status: Completed
- Type: Office
- Location: 100 North 18th Street, Philadelphia, Pennsylvania, U.S.
- Coordinates: 39.9556°N 75.1699°W
- Construction started: 1984
- Opening: 1987
- Owner: The Rubenstien Company

Height
- Roof: 435 ft (133 m)

Technical details
- Floor count: 35
- Floor area: 692,333 sq ft (64,319.8 m^{2})

Design and construction
- Architect: Kohn Pedersen Fox

Two Logan Square is a highrise office building in Center City Philadelphia just off the Benjamin Franklin Parkway. The building is known for its signature roofline with a backlit clock. It is a companion building to One Logan Square which stands across Cherry Street, and to Three Logan Square, across 18th Street.

The building, designed by the firm Kohn Pedersen Fox, was completed in 1987, the same year as One Liberty Place, which stood as Philadelphia's tallest building for 20 years.

The building's name is a nod to its neighborhood, Logan Square, so named for the nearby Logan Circle, one of William Penn's original five squares of Philadelphia.

Major tenants include the law firm Troutman Pepper LLP and Binswanger.

Previously the private school Delaware Valley High School had its administrative offices in Suite 1900.

== See also ==
- List of tallest buildings in Philadelphia
- List of tallest buildings by U.S. state
- List of tallest buildings in the United States
- List of tallest buildings in the world
