= Architecture of Philadelphia =

Five Centuries of Philadelphia Architecture

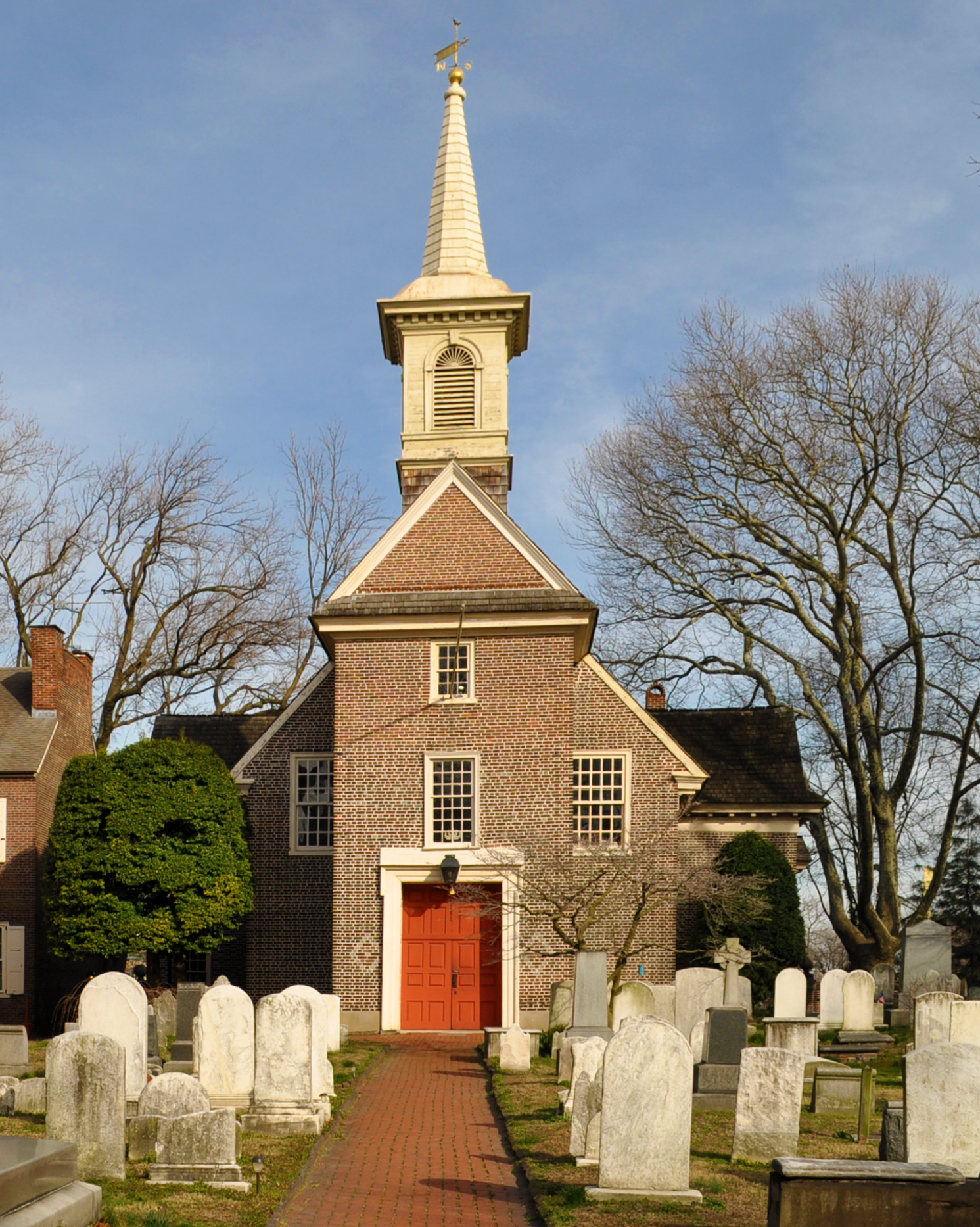
Old Swedes' Church (1698– 1700)

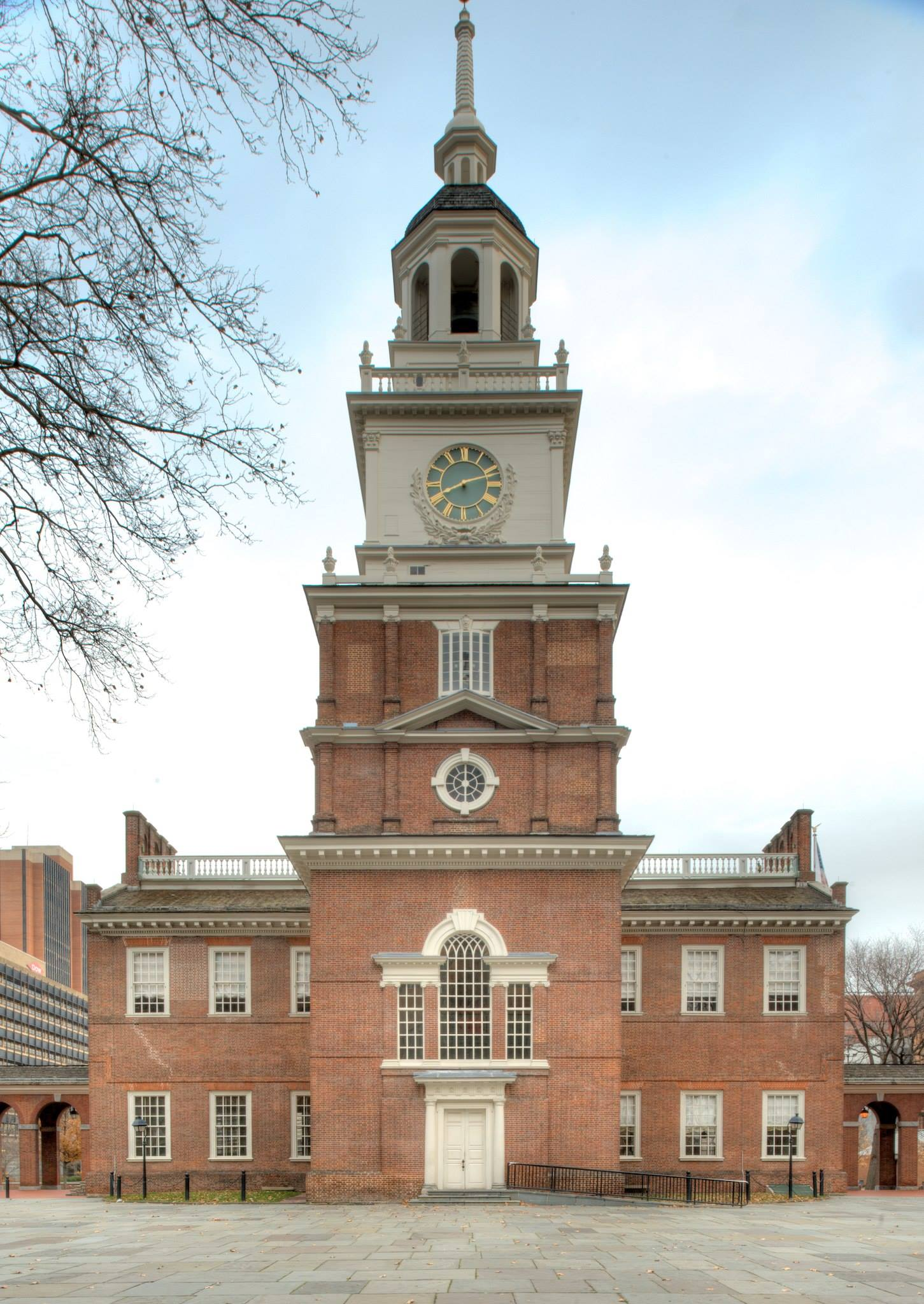
Independence Hall (1732–53)

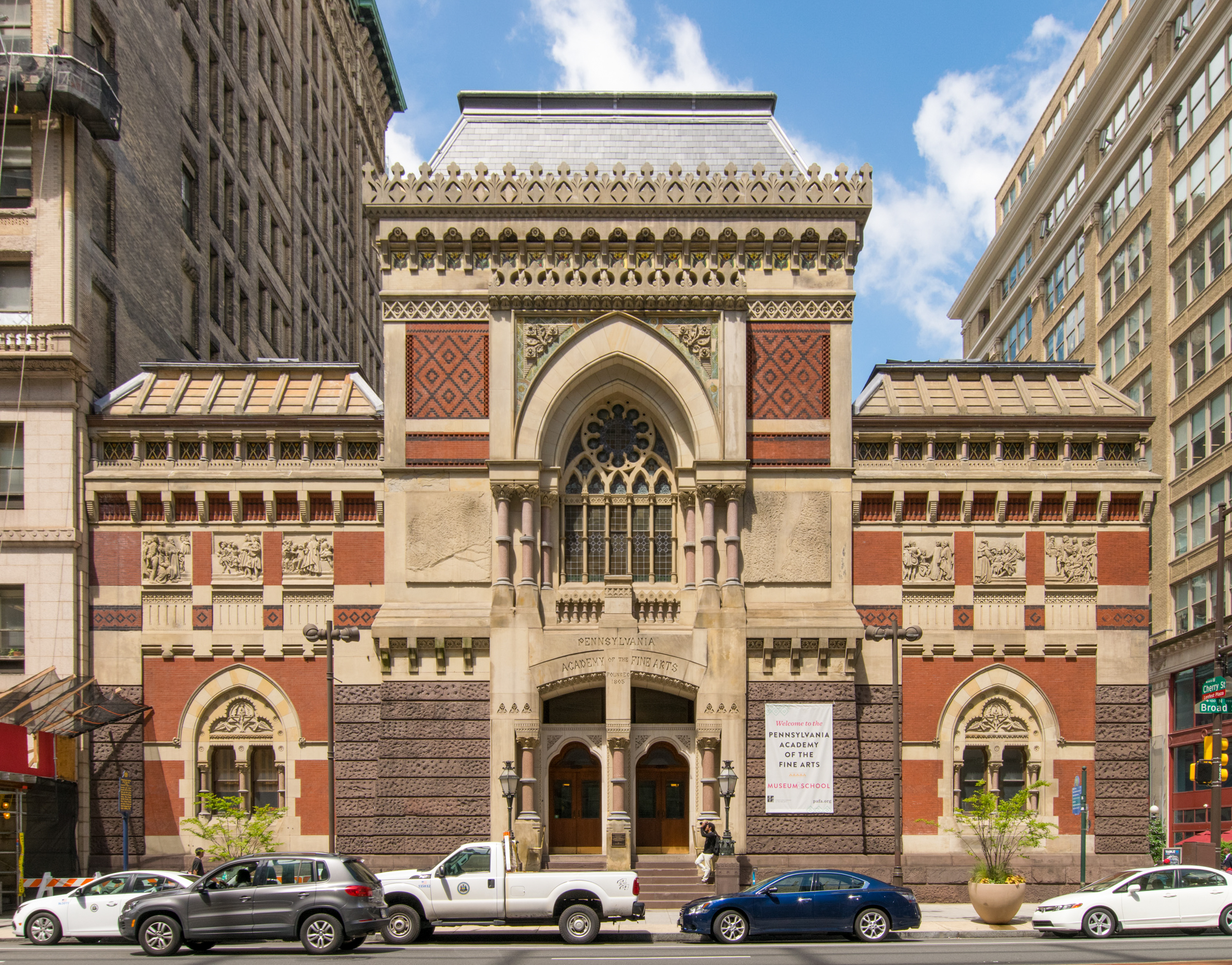
Pennsylvania Academy of the Fine Arts (1876)

Vanna Venturi House (1962)

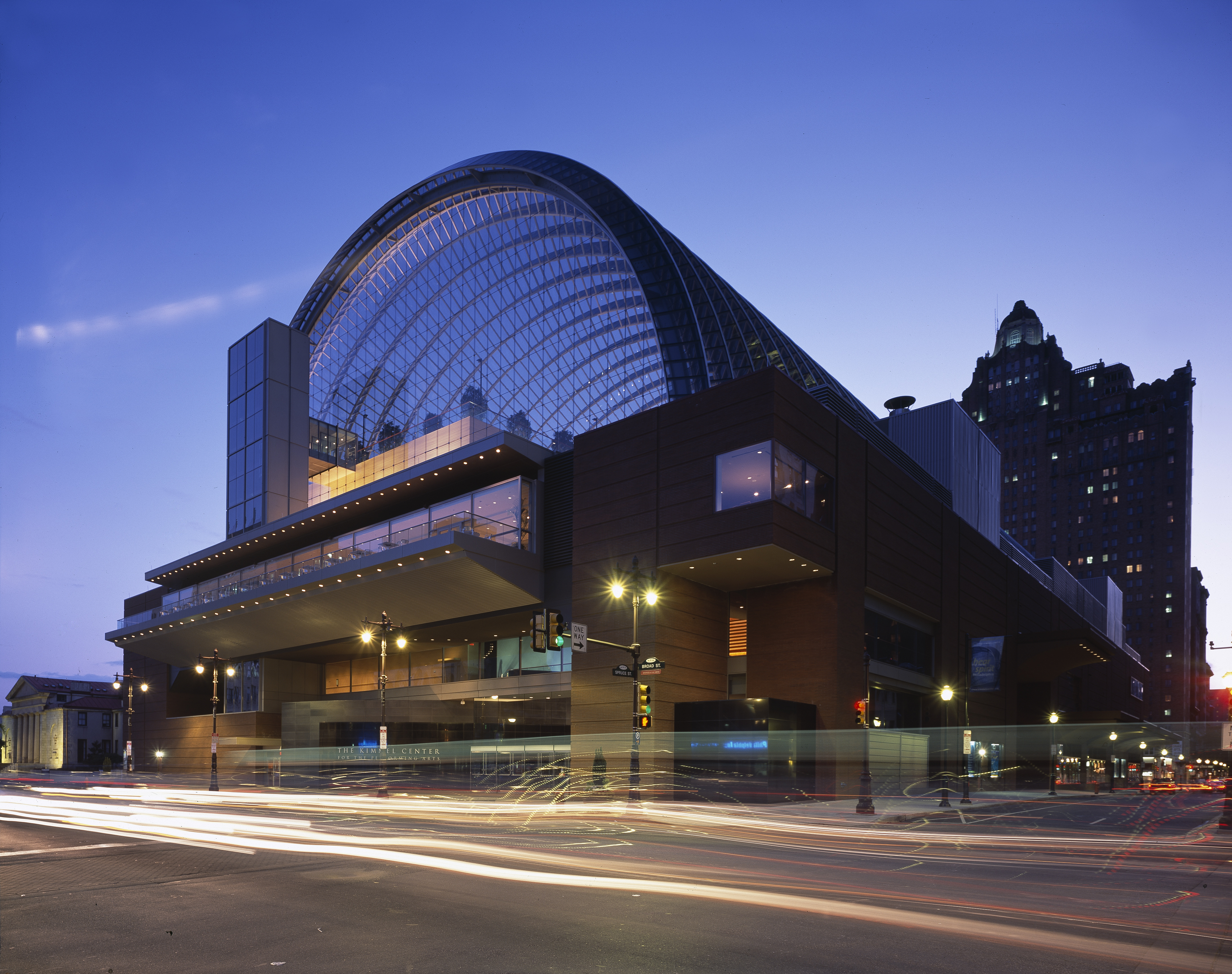
Kimmel Center (2001)

The architecture of Philadelphia is a mix of historic and modern styles that reflect the city's history. The first European settlements appeared within the present day borders of Philadelphia, Pennsylvania in the 17th century with most structures being built from logs. By the 18th century, brick structures had become common. Georgian and later Federal style buildings dominated much of the cityscape. In the first half of the 19th century, Greek revival appeared and flourished with architects such as William Strickland, John Haviland, and Thomas U. Walter. In the second half of the 19th century, Victorian architecture became popular with the city's most notable Victorian architect being Frank Furness.

Steel and concrete skyscrapers appeared in the first decades of the 20th century and glass and granite skyscrapers towards the end of the century. Construction continued into the 21st century with the city tallest building, the Comcast Center. Philadelphia made significant contributions in the architecture of the United States. The row house was introduced to the United States via Philadelphia in the 17th century, the United States' first International style skyscraper was built in Philadelphia, and one of the most important examples of Postmodern architecture, Robert Venturi's Guild House, is located in the city.

== Skyscrapers ==
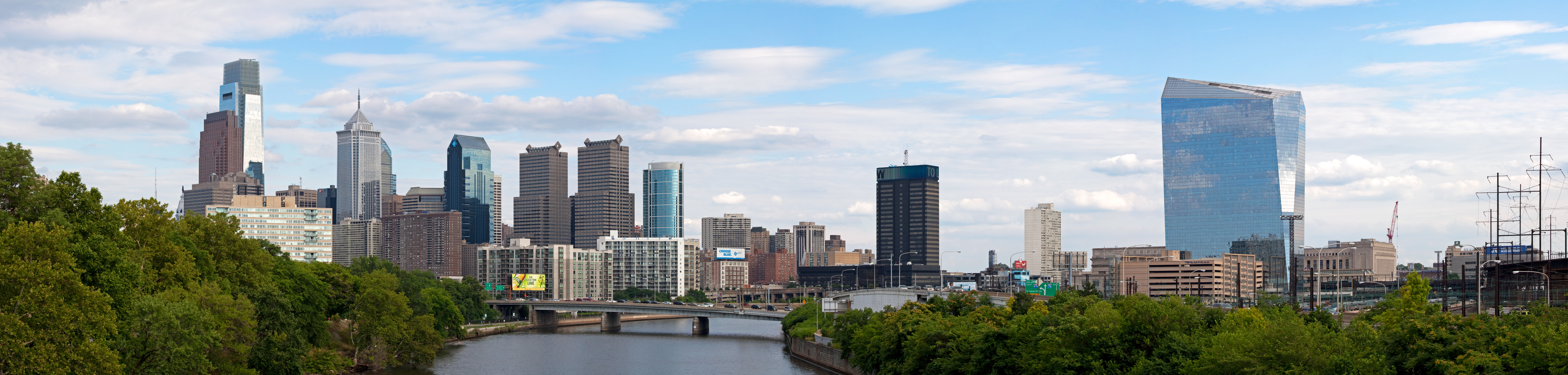
Center City Philadelphia looking southeast from Spring Garden Street Bridge

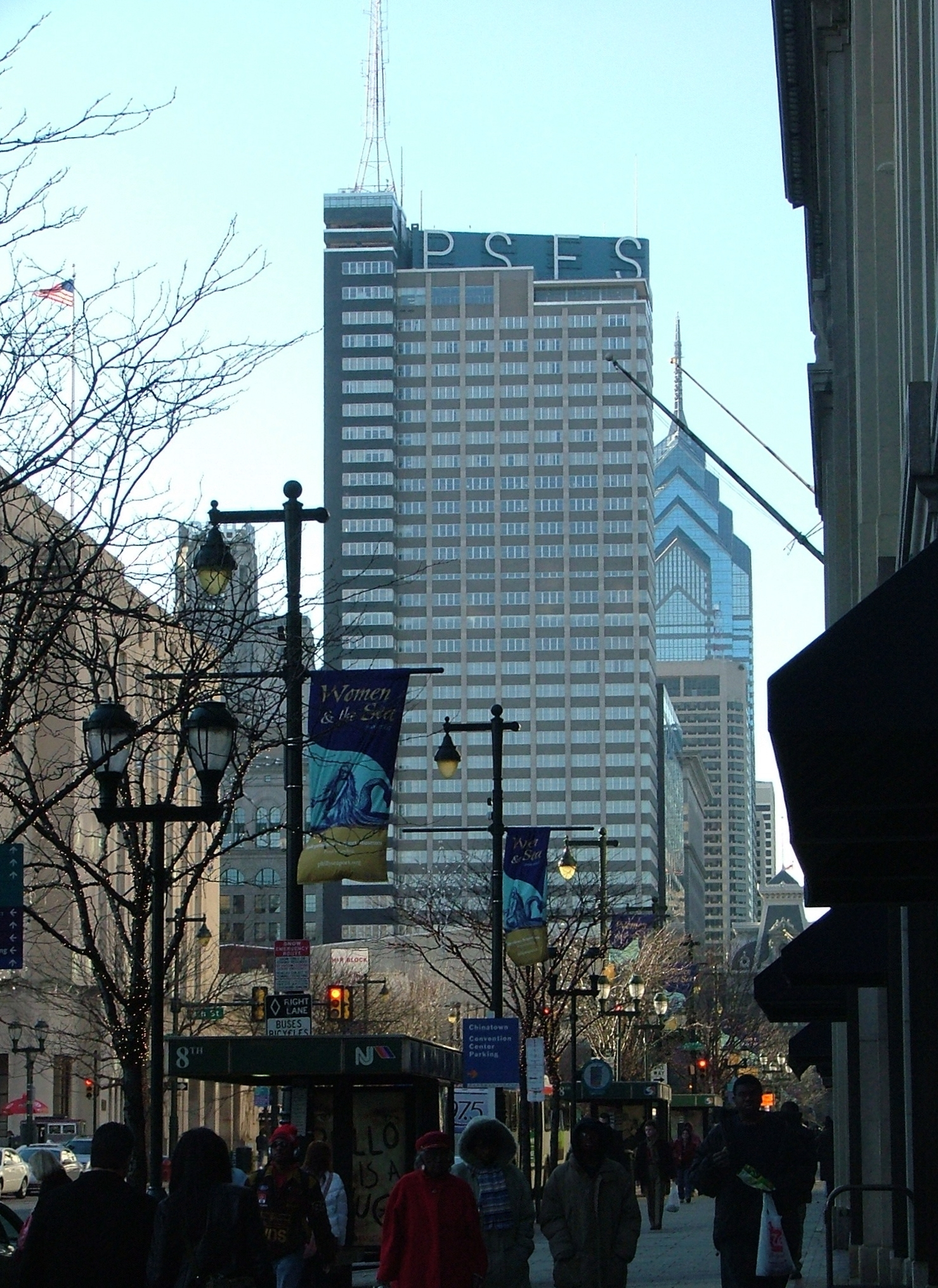
The PSFS Building (1931) with Liberty Place (1987) in the background

Numerous steel and concrete skyscrapers were constructed in the first two decades of the 20th century. In the 1920s construction continued with skyscrapers such as the Aldine Trust Building, the Lewis Tower, the Drake Hotel, the Ben Franklin House and the Rittenhouse Plaza. In the early 1930s 30th Street Station, Convention Hall, and the Franklin Institute were constructed. In 1932 the United States' first International style skyscraper was built. The 631,006 sq.ft. PSFS Building, which was designed by George Howe and William Lescaze, was topped with the Philadelphia Savings Fund Society's initials in 27 ft red neon letters and is decorated with custom made interior detailing.

In the late 1980s and early 1990s, large glass and granite skyscrapers were built in Center City. The largest skyscraper was Liberty Place. Consisting of the 945-ft (288 m) One Liberty Place, the 848-ft (258 m) Two Liberty Place and a smaller hotel, Liberty Place was the first building taller than Philadelphia's City Hall. Before construction began, the Philadelphia City Council had given permission for buildings to be taller than City Hall to encourage skyscraper development along Market Street. Liberty Place was designed by Helmut Jahn, who combined historical architecture style with post-modern style. In the case of Liberty Place, Jahn was influenced by the art deco Chrysler Building in New York City. According to the curse of Billy Penn, which appeared sometime after Liberty Place was constructed, no Philadelphia sports team would win a championship as long as there was a building taller than the statue of William Penn on top of City Hall. For a detailed description of Philadelphia's building height "wars," see Thom Nickels' 'Philadelphia Architecture,' published in 2005.

New office towers also appeared, including the Comcast Center which was the tallest building between 2007 and 2017. The Comcast Technology Center then became the tallest skyscraper in Philadelphia and the tallest skyscraper in the United States outside of Manhattan and Chicago. More skyscrapers, mostly condominiums, are under construction or in-planning such as Waterfront Square, and Mandeville Place.

=== Tallest buildings ===
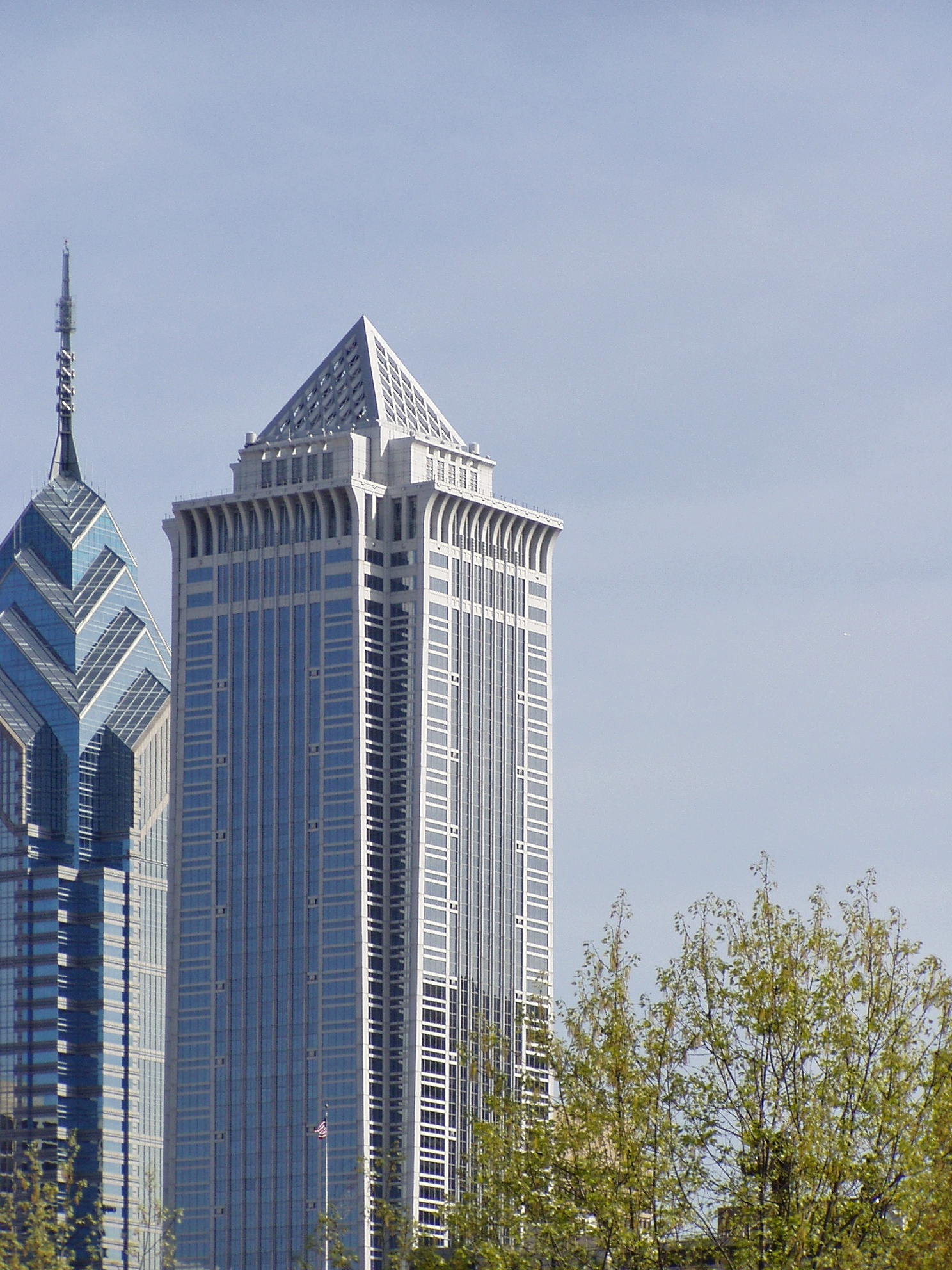
One Liberty Place (left) and Mellon Bank Center (right)

Rank	Building	Height feet/meters	Floors	Year
1	Comcast Technology Center	1,121 / 342	60	2017
2	Comcast Center	975 / 297	57	2008
3	One Liberty Place	945 / 288	61	1987
4	Two Liberty Place	848 / 258	58	1990
5	Mellon Bank Center	792 / 241	54	1990
6	Three Logan Square	739 / 225	55	1991
7	G. Fred DiBona Jr. Building	625 / 191	45	1990
8=	One Commerce Square	565 / 172	41	1992
9=	Two Commerce Square	565 / 172	41	1987
10	Philadelphia City Hall	548 / 167	9	1901
11	Residences At The Ritz-Carlton	518 / 158	48	2009
12	1818 Market Street	500 / 152	40	1974

== Landmarks and monuments ==
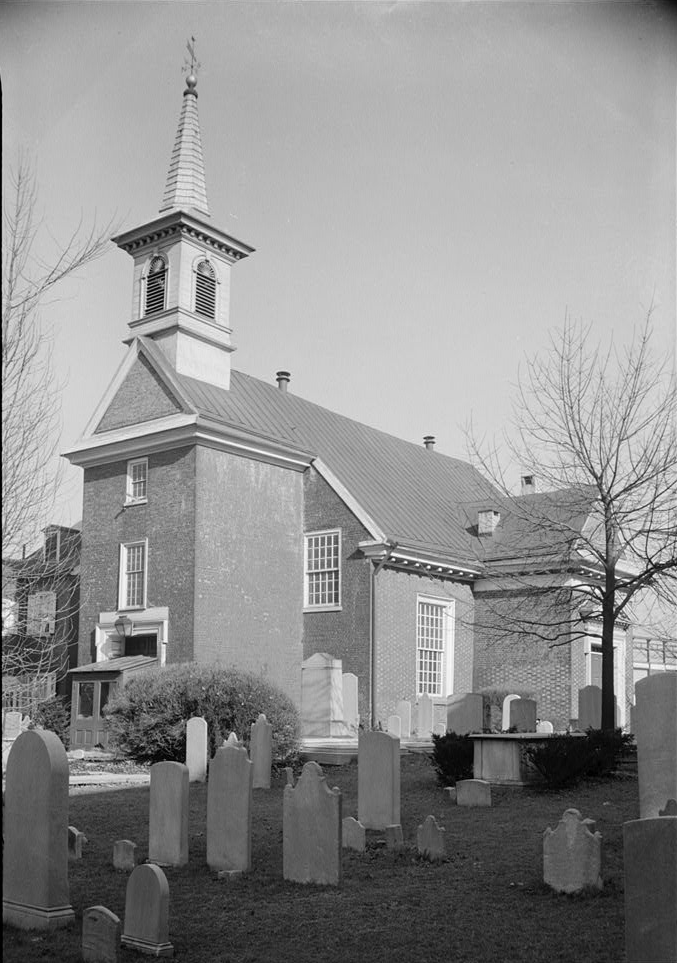
Old Swedes' (Gloria Dei) Church (1700)

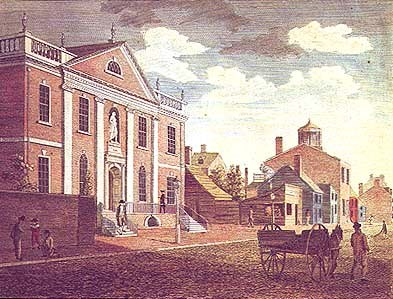
Library Hall (1790, demolished 1887) was reconstructed by the American Philosophical Society in 1959)

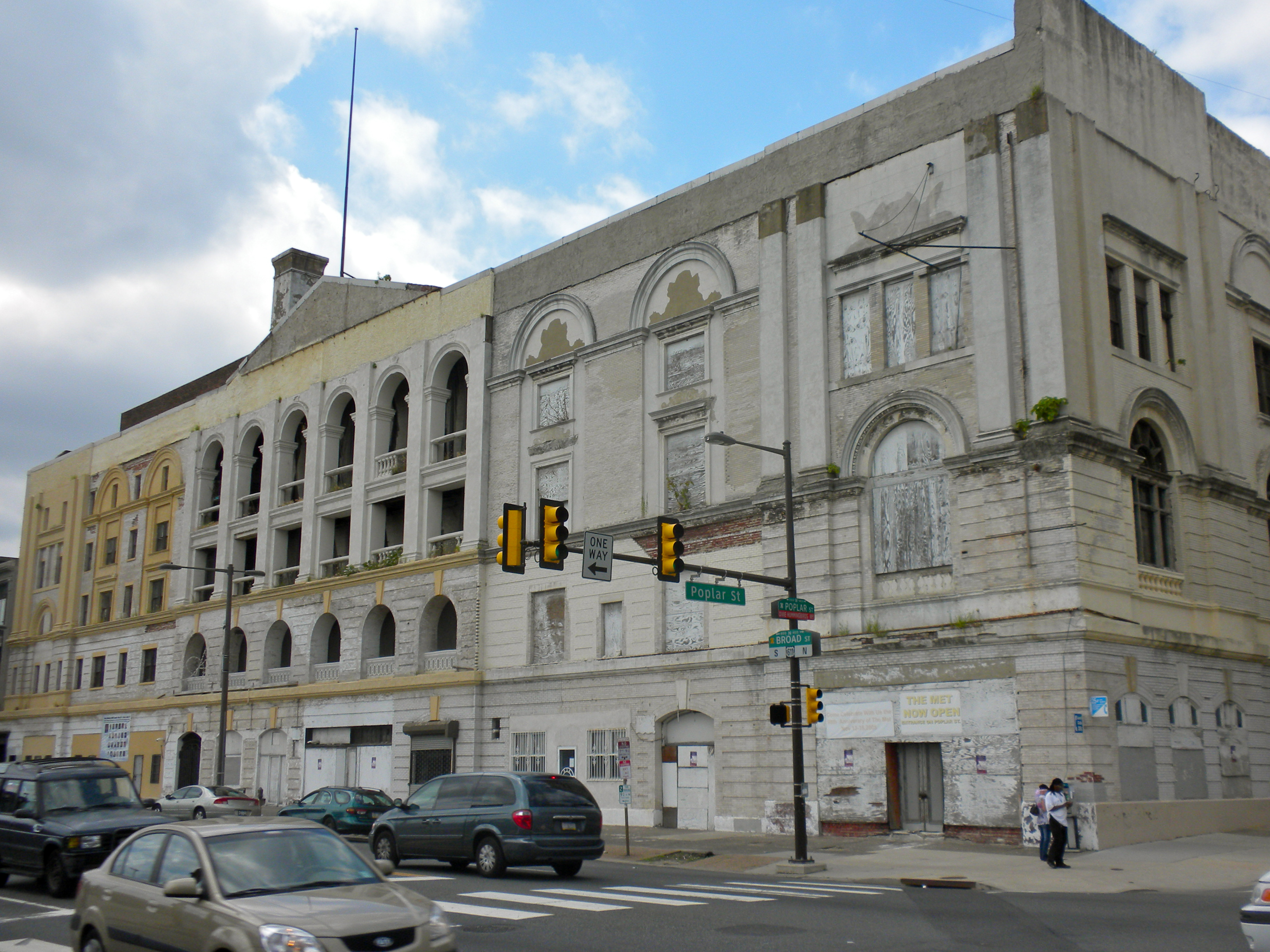
Metropolitan Opera House

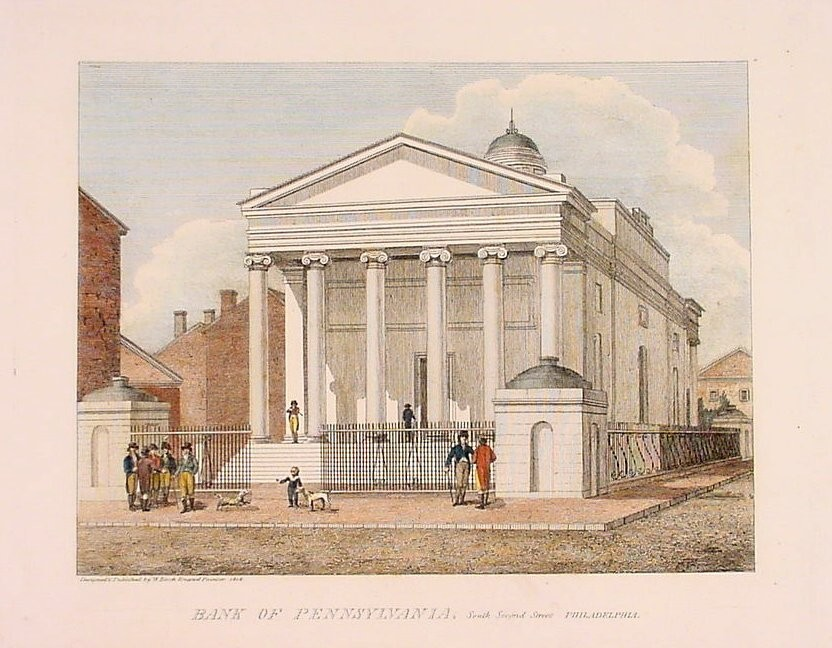
Bank of Pennsylvania (1801)

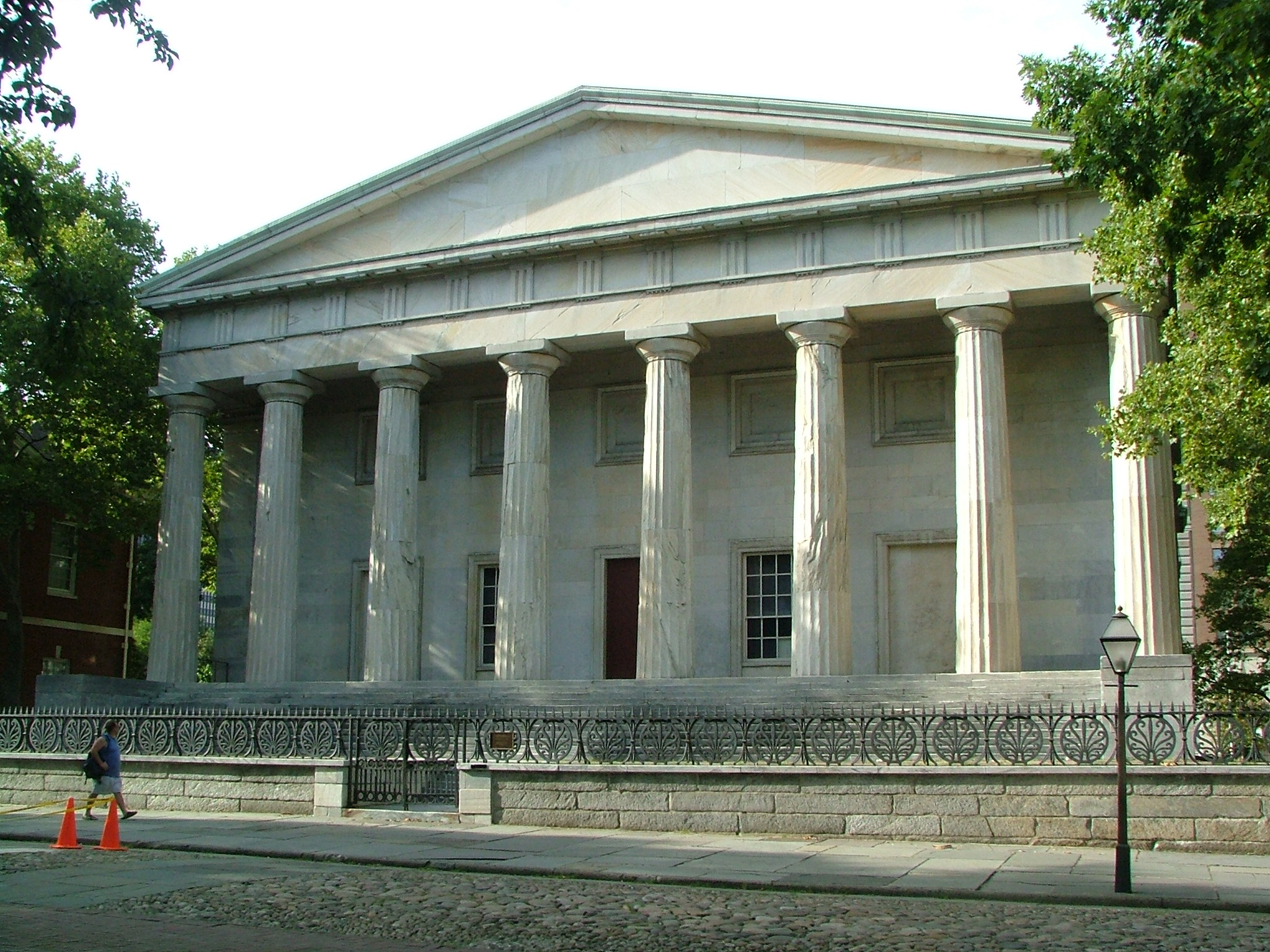
Second Bank of the United States (1816)

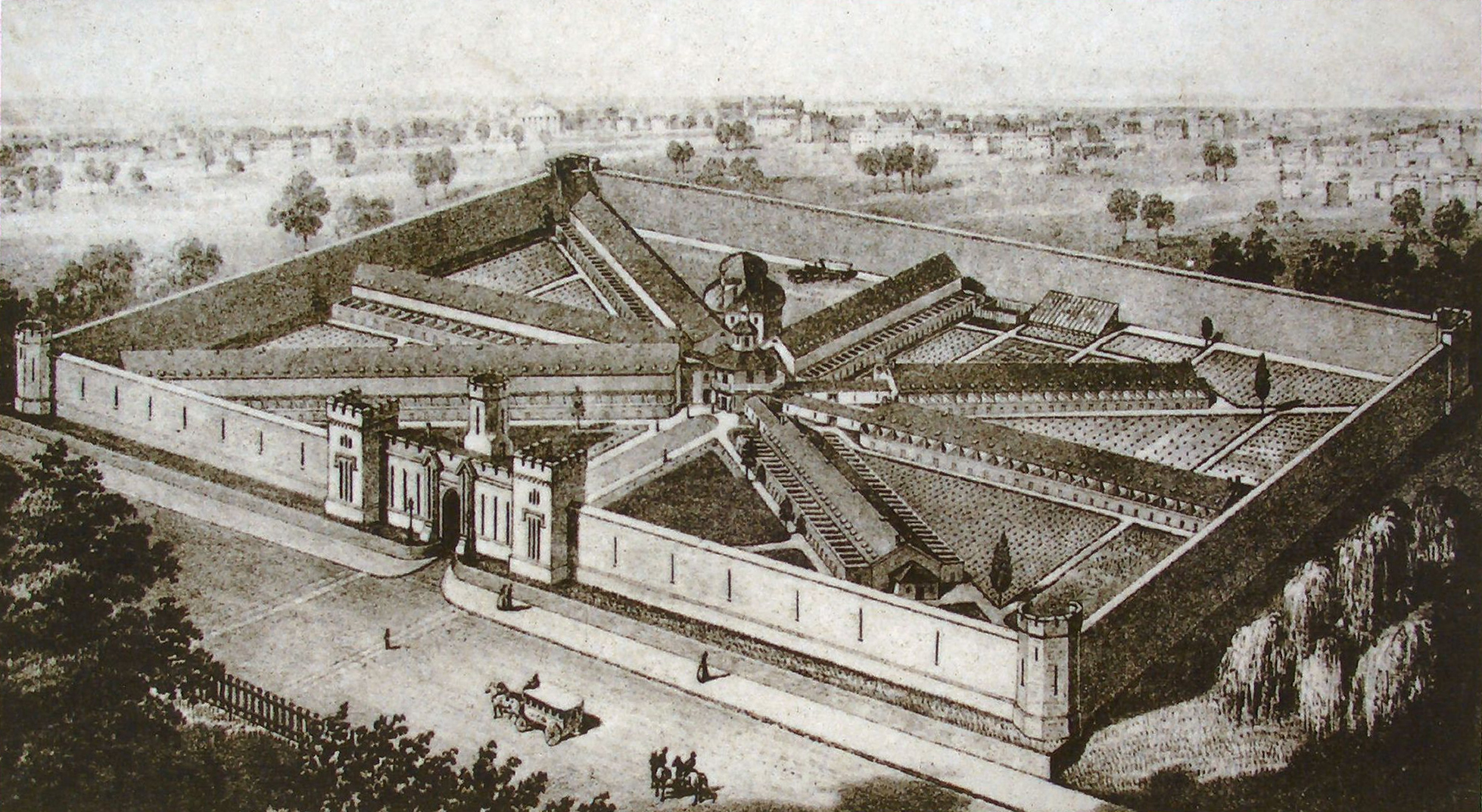
Eastern State Penitentiary (1829)

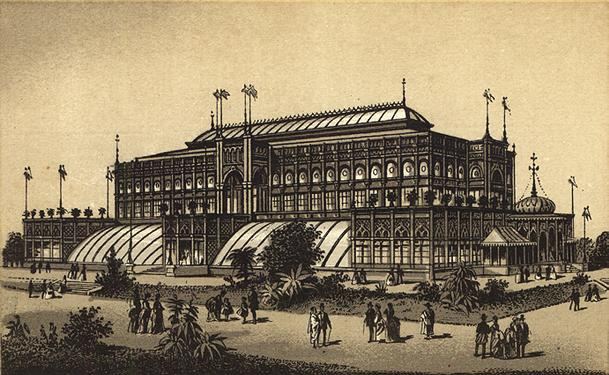
Horticultural Hall (1876, demolished 1955)

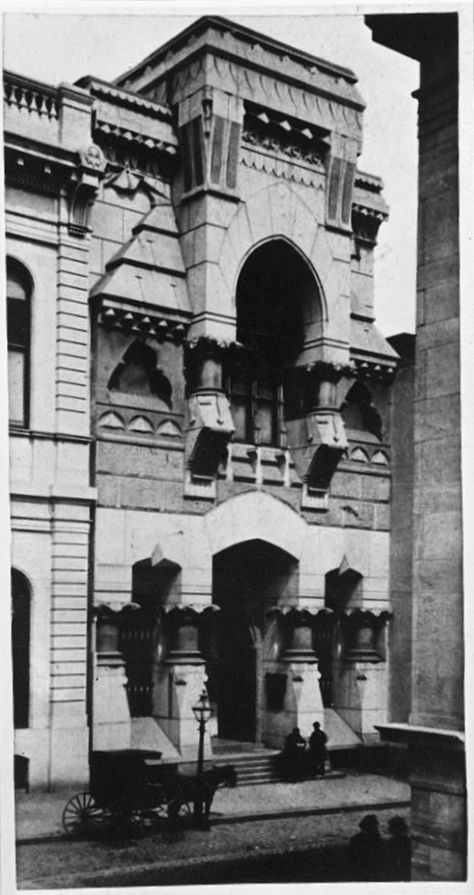
Provident Life & Trust Company (1879, demolished 1959-60)

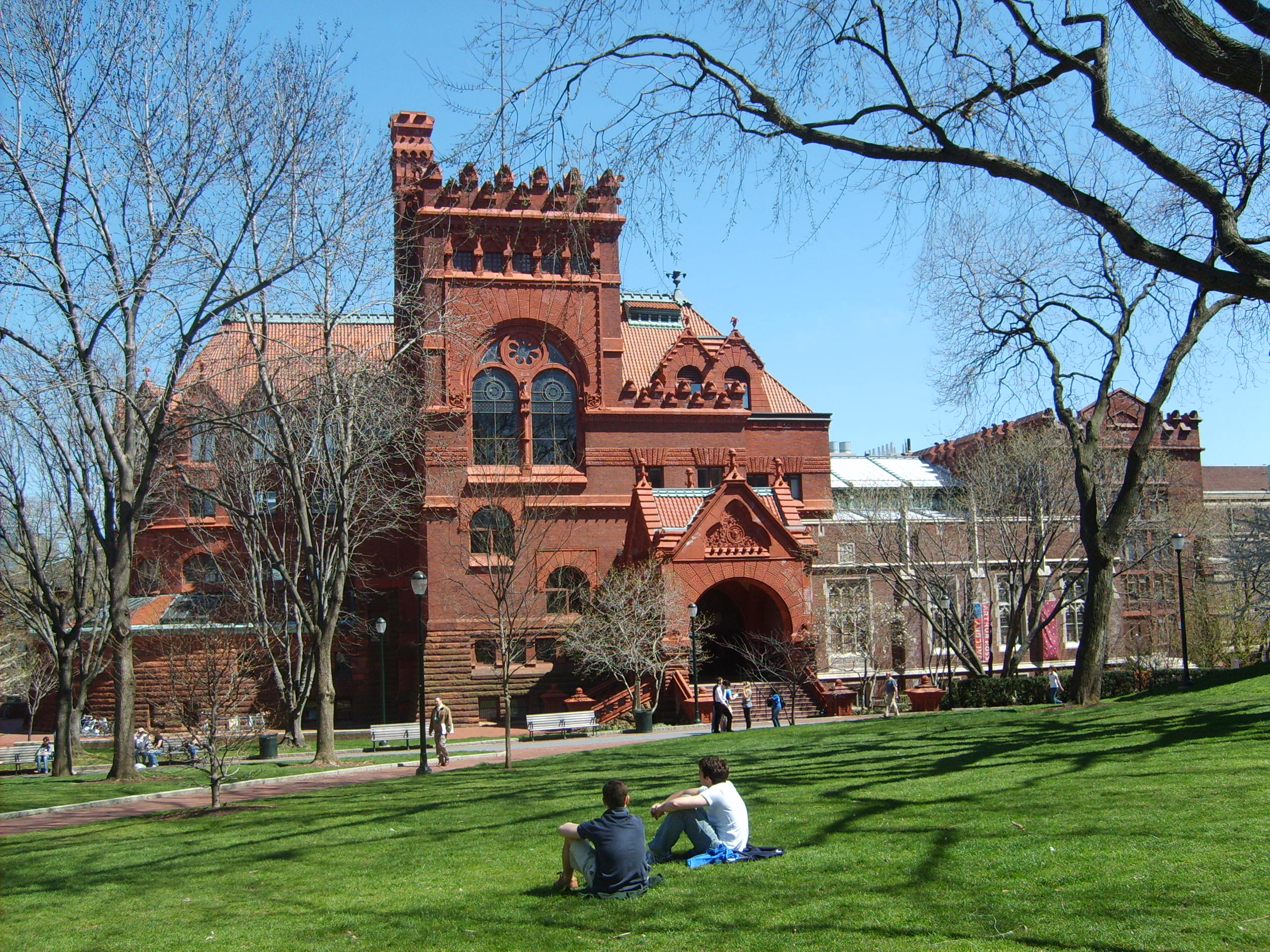
University of Pennsylvania Library (1891)

Buildings soon became more elaborate and in 1724 the Carpenters' Company of the City and County of Philadelphia was formed to help instruct builders. As in London, Georgian architecture soon became the popular design in Philadelphia. In 1730 statesman and businessman James Logan was one of the first in Philadelphia to build a country home outside the city. The mansion, which he called Stenton, was the first Queen Anne-style building in the Delaware Valley. One of the most ambitious Palladian structures of the time was the Christ Church. Christ Church was completed in 1744 with a steeple added in 1754. Starting in the 1730s construction began on the Georgian-style Pennsylvania State House, now known as Independence Hall. It was designed by Andrew Hamilton with construction supervised by Edmund Woolley.

A shift away from the Georgian style began with the construction of Library Hall in 1790. The first building designed by William Thornton, the Palladian Library Hall was inspired by the work of Robert Adam, popular in England at the time, with two-story pilasters and an ornamental balustrade. The similar Federal style also became fashionable, with one of the city's best examples being David Evans Jr.'s Central Pavilion of the Pennsylvania Hospital, completed in 1805. Around the same time Classicism became popular with the creation of the Woodlands estate in 1788 and the First Presbyterian Church in 1793.

The Greek Revival style began in the United States with Benjamin Henry Latrobe's Bank of Pennsylvania in 1801. It was constructed of white marble with Greek Ionic temple porticos on two sides, and topped with a low dome. Latrobe left Philadelphia to design the United States Capitol, but others continued with the style.

Robert Mills designed Octagon Unitarian Church in 1813, and a 6,000 seat auditorium called Washington Hall in 1816. He is best remembered as the designer of the Washington Monument in Washington, D.C., however, all of Mills's Philadelphia buildings have been demolished.

William Strickland's first major commission was the Second Bank of the United States. One critic said the Second Bank "excels in elegance and equals in utility, the edifice, not only of the Bank of England, but of any banking house in the world." Among Strickland's other buildings were the Naval Asylum completed in 1824, the Arch Street Theater built in 1828, the Mechanics National Bank and the Merchant's Exchange completed in 1834.

John Haviland's first major building was the Philadelphia Arcade, an ancestor of the shopping mall. Built in 1827, he based it on the Burlington Arcade in London. In 1829 Haviland's Eastern State Penitentiary was completed, and its innovative spoked-wheel design served as the model for hundreds of other prisons. Other buildings include the former Franklin Institute (now the Atwater Kent Museum) and the Walnut Street Theater, along with St. George's Episcopal Church and the Pennsylvania Institution for the Deaf and Dumb, now the University of the Art's Dorrance Hamilton Hall.

Another significant architect was Thomas U. Walter, whose most important Philadelphia building, Girard College, was completed in 1847. Along with numerous churches, Walter built the now demolished Gothic-style Philadelphia County Prison and the Egyptian-style debtor's prison in Moyamensing. He also designed and built the iron dome of the United States Capitol.

In the 1840s and 50s many old buildings were replaced by larger business structures. Built from red sandstone, granite, and iron, the buildings varied in designs including Greek Revival, Gothic, and Italianate. One of the tallest buildings was the eight-story Jayne Building. Designed by William L. Johnston, the building had a Venetian Gothic façade and an observation tower designed by Thomas U. Walter. The Jayne Building was completed in 1850 and demolished in 1957. The city's first entirely cast-iron building was built in 1850. Built for Penn Mutual Life Insurance Company, the building was designed by G. P. Cummings. The 1869 original Philadelphia Savings Fund Society (PFSF) building, designed by Addison Hutton with an addition by Frank Furness in 1895 has been preserved as part of The St. James, a luxury high-rise apartment on Washington Square.

The Centennial Exposition, the first American World's Fair, took place in Philadelphia in 1876. The exposition included the construction of over 200 buildings, most temporary, including the Main Exhibition Building, designed by Joseph M. Wilson and Henry Petit, which was the largest building in the world at the time. The Exposition's two major permanent buildings were Horticultural Hall and Memorial Hall, both designed by Herman J. Schwarzmann. Horticultural Hall (demolished 1955) was a Moorish-style glass-and-iron structure built as a tribute to London's Crystal Palace. The Beaux-Arts-style Memorial Hall (now home to the Please Touch Museum) was constructed of brick, glass, iron and granite.

Philadelphia's most prominent Victorian architect was Frank Furness, who designed more than 600 buildings and influenced by the Chicago architect Louis Sullivan. Furness brought a bold muscularity to his works, shunned historical imitation, and was an innovator in the use of iron and glass. Among his major buildings are the Pennsylvania Academy of the Fine Arts (1876) (designed with George Hewitt), Knowlton Mansion (1882), the First Unitarian Church (1885), and the University of Pennsylvania Library (1891). Others, such as the Provident Life & Trust Company (1879), the B. & O. Railroad's 24th Street Station (1888), and the Pennsylvania Railroad's Broad Street Station (1893), were demolished in the mid-20th century.

Designed by John McArthur Jr. in the Second Empire style, and influenced by the Tuileries Palace and the Louvre, Philadelphia City Hall is one of the world's largest all-masonry, load-bearing structures without a steel frame. Construction began in 1871 and wasn't completed until 1901. City Hall is a square doughnut of a building that occupies a 4-block site at the center of the downtown. In the middle of each side is an arched portal leading into the central courtyard, and its north side includes a 548 ft clock tower. Until 1987, this tower was the tallest structure in the city.

In 1908, Oscar Hammerstein I (grandfather of the lyricist) built the Metropolitan Opera House (originally known as the Philadelphia Opera House) to be the home of his then new opera company, the Philadelphia Opera Company. Seating more than 4,000 people, it was the largest building of its kind in the world when it was built. The Metropolitan Opera of New York City bought the Philadelphia opera house in 1910 which was used by the company for its touring productions to Philadelphia for roughly the next decade. In the 1920s, the theatre became a venue for the cinema and in the 1930s it became a ballroom. In the 1940s, a sports promoter bought the venue, covering the orchestra pit with flooring so basketball, wrestling, and boxing could take place. This venture closed after attendance waned following a decline in the quality of the opera house's neighborhood. The building was sold to Reverend Thea Jones for use as a church in 1954. The church's congregation eventually decreased and the church was unable to afford to maintain the rapidly deteriorating building. In 1994 the building was declared by the city to be dangerous and was to be demolished. Reverend Mark Hatcher and his church purchased the building in 1996 with the intention of repairing the building. In partnership with the North Philadelphia Community Development Corporation, the church plans to continue with further historic restoration in the future. In 2009 the opera house was the focal point of the Hidden City Festival, a festival dedicated to promoting lesser known historical sites in the Philadelphia area.

After World War II new development projects appeared all around Philadelphia. In Center City modern office buildings were constructed including Penn Center, and the Municipal Services Building. Around Independence National Historical Park a new U.S. Mint building, a new federal courthouse, and the Rohm and Haas Building were built. Just east of Chinatown the circular Police Administration Building was built.

== Residential architecture ==
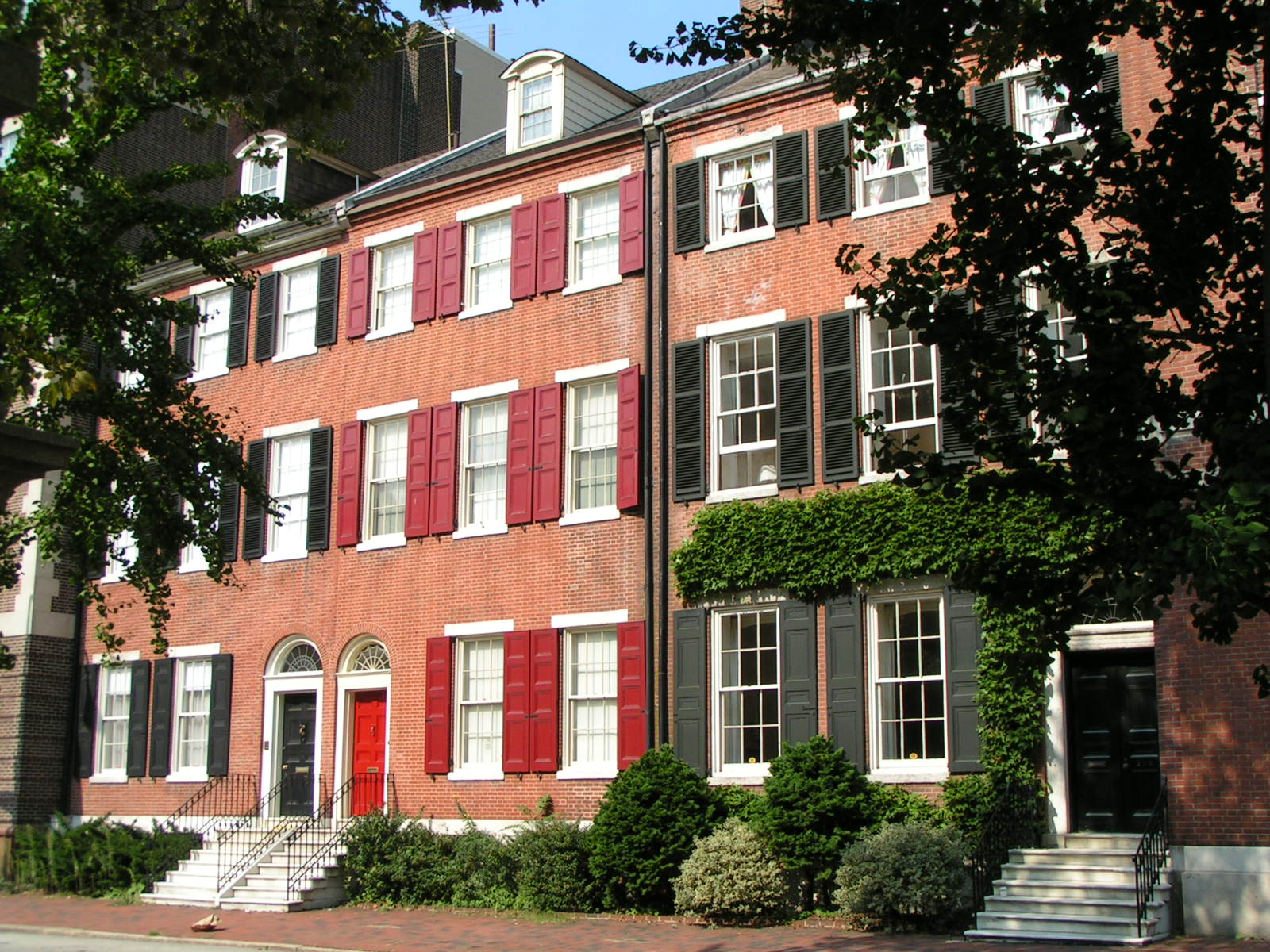
Georgian style homes in Philadelphia

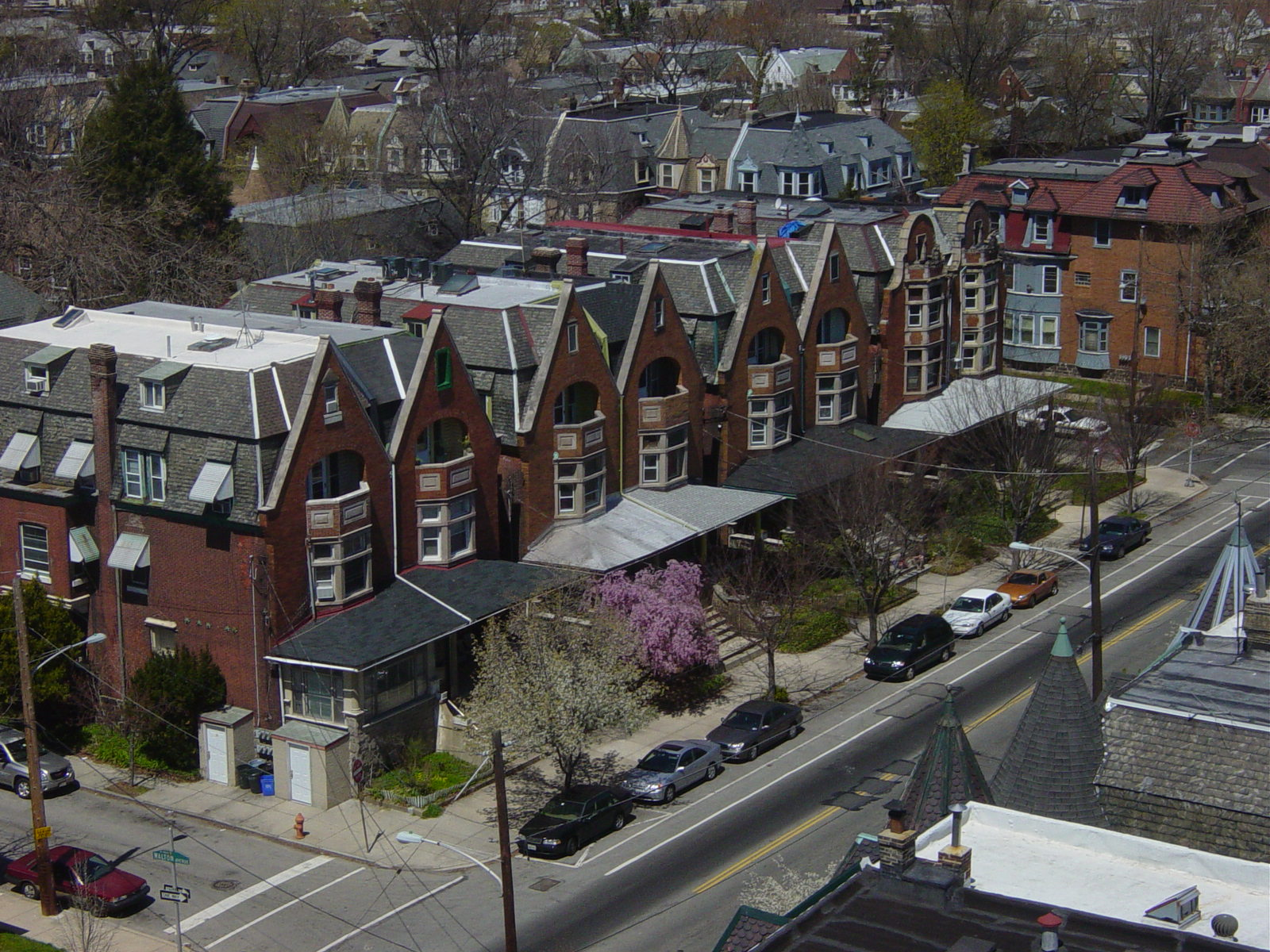
Row houses in West Philadelphia

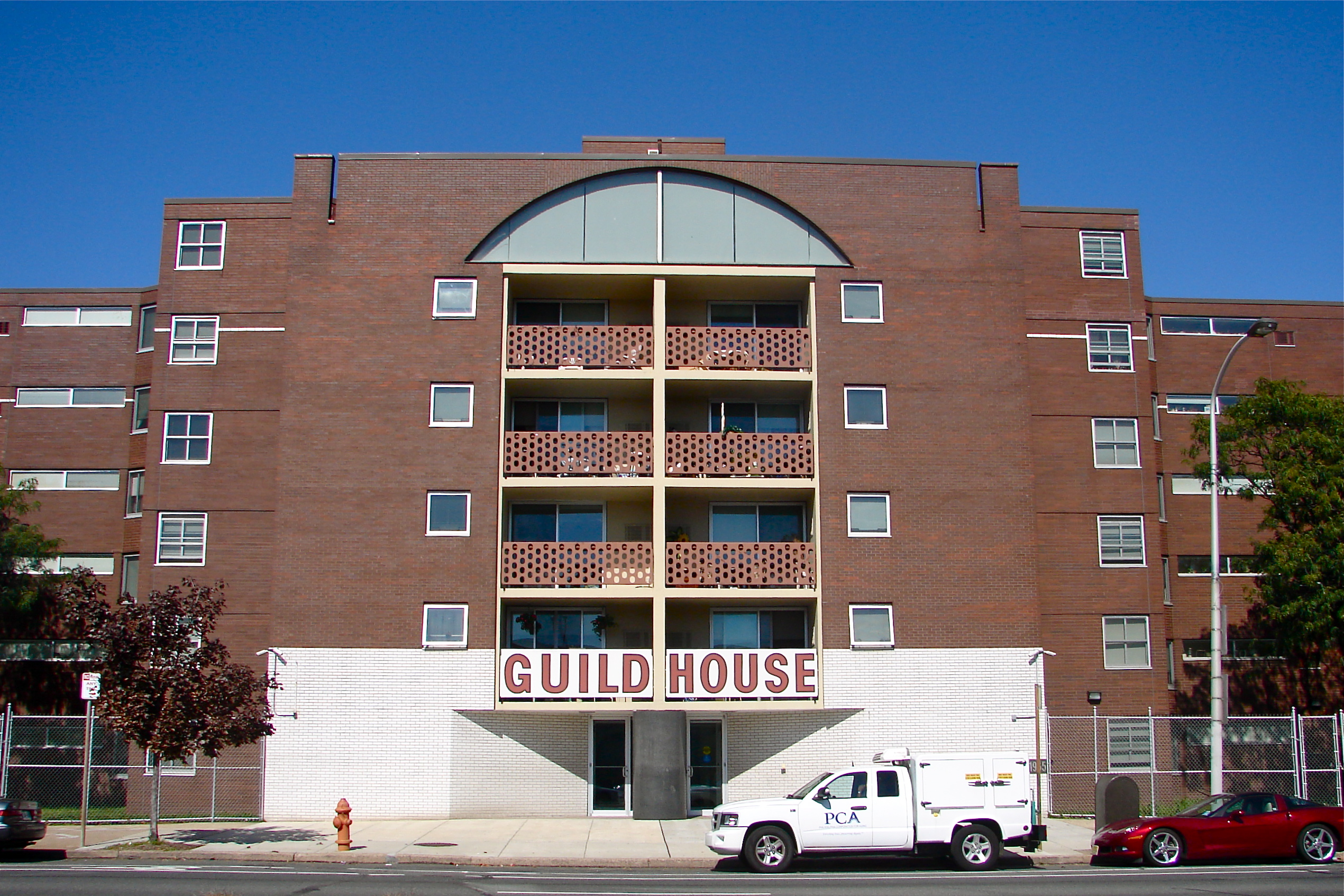
Venturi's Guild House

The earliest houses in Philadelphia were built with logs, with the new English settlers being taught how to build log homes by the Swedish settlers already living in the area. Early inhabitants had also dug out caves on the Delaware riverbank which were reportedly places of "clandestine looseness". The Philadelphia settlers soon began constructing buildings with wood and brick with the first brick house being built in 1684. By 1690 four brickmakers and ten bricklayers were working in the city. In 1698 construction of the Gloria Dei (Old Swedes') Church, the oldest surviving building in Philadelphia, began. Construction of the church was completed in 1700. Philadelphia was founded by Quakers and as a result many early buildings were plain and simple, the largest building being the Great Meeting House.

The earliest group of row houses in Philadelphia, called Budd's Long Row, date from 1691. Although no longer in existence, these houses were located on what is now Front Street between Walnut and Dock Streets. According to accounts at the time, these houses were modeled on the floor plans of seventeenth century London houses, being two rooms deep with a rear yard.

A significant, later row house grouping, called Carstairs Row, was built in Philadelphia in 1800-01. William Sansom had bought a block of land between Seventh and Eighth Streets between Walnut Street and Sansom Street. Along Walnut Street Sansom built Union Row and along Sansom Street Thomas Carstairs built Carstairs Row. The rows, now part of Jewelers' Row, were block long rows of houses similar to row houses in the United Kingdom. The row houses were new to the United States as well and when built elsewhere in the country were called "Philadelphia rows". In the 1820s and 30s old buildings along the Delaware River were turned into tenements and factories, while houses a few blocks west were turned into stores. Several story high, brick row house continued to be built, many by Stephen Girard. At the same time granite fronts became popular in the city and marble mansions were constructed.

By the 1930s numerous houses, many of them row homes, were in poor condition in Philadelphia. In a 1934 United States Department of Commerce survey of 433,796 houses found that eight in every thousand homes lacked water, about 3,000 homes lacked heating, and that 7,000 homes were unfit for habitation. By 1939 conditions had only improved slightly. One development was the low cost housing development named the Carl Mackley Apartments. Constructed between 1933 and 1934, the apartments were commissioned by the American Federation of Hosiery Workers and designed by Oskar Stonorov. The way the apartments were laid out, with gardens, lawns, play areas, underground garages, and space for public art were new architectural designs at the time.

An early urban renewal project was Society Hill where many old buildings were rehabilitated and I. M. Pei's Society Hill Towers were built. Outside the revitalized neighborhoods vacant lots remained. In 1990 Philadelphia had around 40,000 vacant properties and by 2006 that number had dropped to around 20,000.

While Philadelphia neighborhoods changed, architecture continued to evolve. In Chestnut Hill, architects like George Howe and Wilson Eyre set the tone for residences in the region. Howe's High Hollow and Eyre's Anglecot demonstrate the European and Beaux Arts influence on Chestnut Hill's architecture in the early part of the 20th century.

Architect Louis Kahn, grew up, studied and worked in Philadelphia and is considered one of the most important architects of the second half of the 20th century. In Philadelphia Kahn's designs includes the University of Pennsylvania's Richards Medical Center and Esherick House in Chestnut Hill.

The Guild House, one of Robert Venturi's earliest works, built in 1964, is considered one of the most important examples of post-modernism.

Tax breaks created in 1997 and 2000 helped create a condominium boom in Center City. In the first years of the 21st century, old buildings rehabilitated into condominiums and new luxury condominium towers appeared all around Center City and the surrounding neighborhoods.

== See also ==
- List of houses in Fairmount Park
