= Dolobran (disambiguation) =

Dolobran may refer to:

- Dolobran, Montgomeryshire, historic estate of the Lloyd family
- Dolobran (Haverford, Pennsylvania), 1881 shingle-style mansion and estate
- Dolobran II, original name of the Gladwyne, Pennsylvania mansion and estate "Linden Hill"
