= Edmund Gilchrist =

American architect (1885–1953)

Edmund B. Gilchrist
- Gilchrist c. 1927
- Born: March 13, 1885; Philadelphia, Pennsylvania, United States
- Died: December 18, 1953 (aged 68); Philadelphia, Pennsylvania, United States
- Education: University of Pennsylvania
- Occupation: Architect
- Parent(s): William W. Gilchrist, father
- Relatives: William W. Gilchrist Jr., brother

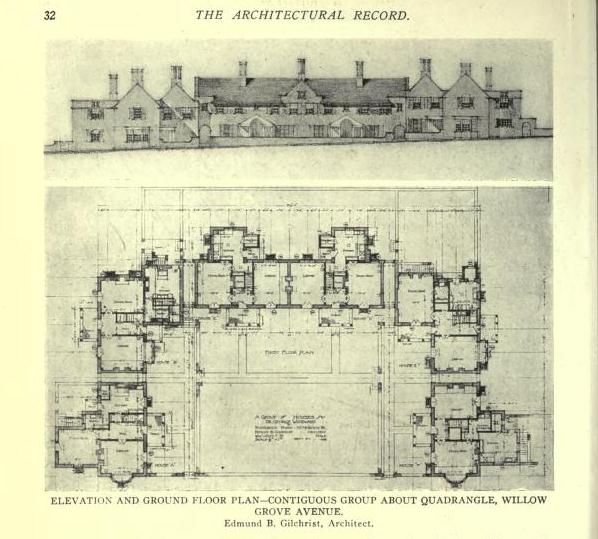
Elevation and plan for "Linden Court" (1915), Chestnut Hill, Philadelphia, Pennsylvania.

Edmund Beaman Gilchrist (March 13, 1885 – December 18, 1953) was an American architect, best remembered for his English-Cotswold and French-Norman suburban houses.

== Early life and education ==
Edmund Beaman Gilchrist was born on March 13, 1885, in Philadelphia, Pennsylvania. His father was William W. Gilchrist, a noted musician and composer. His brother was noted painter, William W. Gilchrist Jr.

He attended Germantown Friends School, Drexel University for a year, and graduated from the University of Pennsylvania in 1906. He apprenticed in the offices of architects Horace Trumbauer and Wilson Eyre, and launched his own firm in 1911.

== Career ==
In the 1880s and 1890s, architects G. W. & W. D. Hewitt designed more than 100 houses in the Chestnut Hill section of Philadelphia for developer Henry H. Houston. A generation later, Dr. George Woodward, Houston's son-in-law, hired Gilchrist, H. Louis Duhring Jr., and Robert Rodes McGoodwin to expand the planned community, building dozens of freestanding houses and attached houses grouped to look like manor houses. The Woodward houses were rental properties and, a century later, most remain so.

In addition to suburban houses, Gilchrist designed summer houses (especially in Maine), churches, a Moderne-style public library, a Federal-style city hall, and alterations to numerous residences. He designed a 33-story Art Deco skyscraper in Philadelphia, and an Art Deco retail store for the candy manufacturer Whitman & Sons.

He was considered an expert on group housing. Working as an architect for the U.S. Navy during World War I, he designed housing at what is now North Island Naval Air Force Base in San Diego, California. During the Depression, he served on President Herbert Hoover's Conference on Home Building and Home Ownership (1932), and on the national AIA's Special Committee on the Economics of Site Planning and Housing (1934–35). He also designed public housing under the WPA and was one of the Philadelphia Housing Authority architects of the Hill Creek Housing Project (1937).

=== Linden Court ===
"Linden Court" (1914–15) was a six-house Georgian Revival development built in Chestnut Hill for Woodward and the Houston Estate. Gilchrist grouped brick double-houses around three sides of a quadrangle, solved the problem of a gently sloping site with terraces, and the problem of back-yard access with covered alleyways. His innovative plan, acute sensitivity to public-versus-private space, and exquisite detailing was recognized as something extraordinary, and received national attention. The development was prominently featured in The Architectural Record (January 1916). The Architectural Forum (July 1917) accompanied a 4-page article with eight pages of photographs. Even the National Housing Association's trade journal, Housing Betterment (February 1918), sang its praises:

Illustrative of the charm of grouped dwellings as one means of retaining uniformity without danger of monotony where a measure of standardization is necessary is a recent residential development known as Linden Court at St. Martin's near Philadelphia. In this the architect, Edmund B. Gilchrist, has achieved several interesting results. By advantageous groupings he was able to put six houses on a piece of land, which treated conventionally would have accommodated but four, or at most five, and he has done this without sacrificing privacy or desirable open space.

The houses, which are of sand-faced brick with slate roofs, are grouped about three sides of a quadrangle 225 feet long by 125 feet deep. They have been pushed back far enough to leave ample space for an individual garden and common grass plot in the quadrangle, but not so far as to eliminate kitchen yards. These yards have been surrounded by a brick wall high enough to secure privacy without cutting off light and air. The houses have six rooms each, the arrangement of which has been sufficiently varied as to give individuality to each home.

While the cost of development and the rents derived from it lifts it out of the class of the "average man's home"—the houses rent for about $50—many of the principles of planning and design which it illustrates are adaptable to lower-cost developments. On the other hand, it touches and solves in a most satisfactory manner the housing problem of the "average man" which, in many communities, is quite as pressing as the industrial housing problem and, as an architectural publication pointed out in describing Linden Court, it is "veritably an exemplification of the truth that beauty pays and that there is no legitimate reason for the desolation of the usual speculative building."

Gilchrist and his wife Anita were among the original residents of Linden Court, moving into the unit at 111 West Willow Grove Avenue in 1915. They raised three sons, and lived there until his death in 1953.

== Selected works ==
- Dr. William W. Gilchrist residence, 102 West Mermaid Lane, Chestnut Hill, Philadelphia, Pennsylvania, 1908, Dr. George Woodward, client. A contributing property in Chestnut Hill Historic District (Philadelphia, Pennsylvania).
- Pastorius Park Houses, 8001 Crefeld Street, Chestnut Hill, Philadelphia, Pennsylvania, 1913, Dr. George Woodward, client. A contributing property in Chestnut Hill Historic District (Philadelphia, Pennsylvania).
- "Cogshill" (Jessie Wilcox Smith residence), 610 St. Georges Road, Mount Airy, Philadelphia, Pennsylvania, 1913–14.
- William C. Kimber residence, 999 East Haines Street, Germantown, Philadelphia, Pennsylvania, 1914. A contributing property in Awbury Historic District.
- Linden Court, 103-13 West Willow Grove Avenue, Chestnut Hill, Philadelphia, Pennsylvania, 1915, Dr. George Woodward, client. A contributing property in Chestnut Hill Historic District (Philadelphia, Pennsylvania).
- Cotswold Village, (Hartwell Lane, Navajo Street, Lincoln Drive, Crefeld Street), Chestnut Hill, Philadelphia, Pennsylvania, 1915–21, Dr. George Woodward, client. Part of the Pastorius Park development. A contributing property in Chestnut Hill Historic District (Philadelphia, Pennsylvania).
- Gilchrist Group Housing, Dale Park, 6701-63 Murray Avenue, Mariemont, Ohio, 1924. A planned community in the Cincinnati suburbs with sections designed by different architects. Gilchrist's Federal-style development was 39 rental apartments designed to look like attached houses. A contributing property in Mariemont Historic District.
- Mariemont Preservation Foundation, 3919 Plainville Road, Mariemont, Ohio, 1924. A contributing property in Mariemont Historic District.
- Cobbs Creek Branch, Free Library of Philadelphia, 5800 Cobbs Creek Parkway, Philadelphia, Pennsylvania, 1924–25. A contributing property in Cobbs Creek Automobile Suburb Historic District.
- Unitarian Society of Germantown, 6511 Lincoln Drive, Philadelphia, Pennsylvania, 1926–28.
- Islesford Historical Museum, Little Cranberry Island, Acadia National Park, Islesford, Maine, 1927. Listed on the National Register of Historic Places.
- Print Club of Philadelphia and Cosmopolitan Club, 1614-16 Latimer Street, Philadelphia, Pennsylvania, 1927. Gilchrist altered a carriage house into the shared clubhouse. Next door, he altered the carriage house at 1618 Latimer into his architectural offices. A contributing property in Center City West Commercial Historic District (Philadelphia, Pennsylvania).
- "Autun" (Benjamin Rush II residence), 371 Boot Road, West Whiteland Township, Pennsylvania, 1928–29. Now named "Meadowcourt." Listed on the National Register of Historic Places.
- Rodman E. Griscom residence, 1543 Monk Road (and Mill Creek Road), Gladwyne, Pennsylvania, 1928–31. A Norman-style manor house and estate overlooking the Schuylkill River, it was originally named "Dolobran II," then "Cedar Crest," and now "Linden Hill." A contributing property in Mill Creek Historic District (Bryn Mawr and Gladwyne, Pennsylvania). The mansion on 50.5 acres was offered for sale in June 2013 with an asking price of $24.5 million.
- Lewis Tower, 1419-25 Locust Street, Philadelphia, Pennsylvania, 1929. A 33-story Art Deco skyscraper. A contributing property in Broad Street Historic District (Philadelphia, Pennsylvania).
- Whitman & Sons Retail Store, 1626 Chestnut Street, Philadelphia, Pennsylvania, 1929. Now a Men's Wearhouse store. The facade's first story drastically altered; the second and third stories mostly unaltered.
- Houston Estate Houses, West Allens Lane, Mount Airy, Philadelphia, Pennsylvania, 1929–30, Dr. George Woodward, client.
- J. Warner Butterworth and F. Hemsley Levis residences, Germantown Avenue & Norman Lane, Chestnut Hill, Philadelphia, Pennsylvania, 1929–33. Butterworth built a manor house for himself, and one for his daughter and son-in-law. Only the Levis house at 10-12 Waterman Avenue remains. A contributing property in Chestnut Hill Historic District (Philadelphia, Pennsylvania).
- Seltzer Development, 5711-21 and 5733-41 Ludlow Street, Philadelphia, Pennsylvania, 1932–33. Nineteen rowhouses.
- Ellsworth City Hall, Ellsworth, Maine, 1935. Listed on the National Register of Historic Places.
- Additions and alterations to Williamson House (William Lord Sexton residence), 44 High Street, Belfast, Maine, 1936. Built in 1842, the house is currently (February 2013) for sale. A contributing property in Church Street Historic District (Belfast, Maine).
- Hill Creek Park Homes, Adams & Rising Sun Avenues, Philadelphia, Pennsylvania, 1936–38, under the direction of Walter H. Thomas, with Robert Rodes McGoodwin, and others. Public housing built under the WPA.
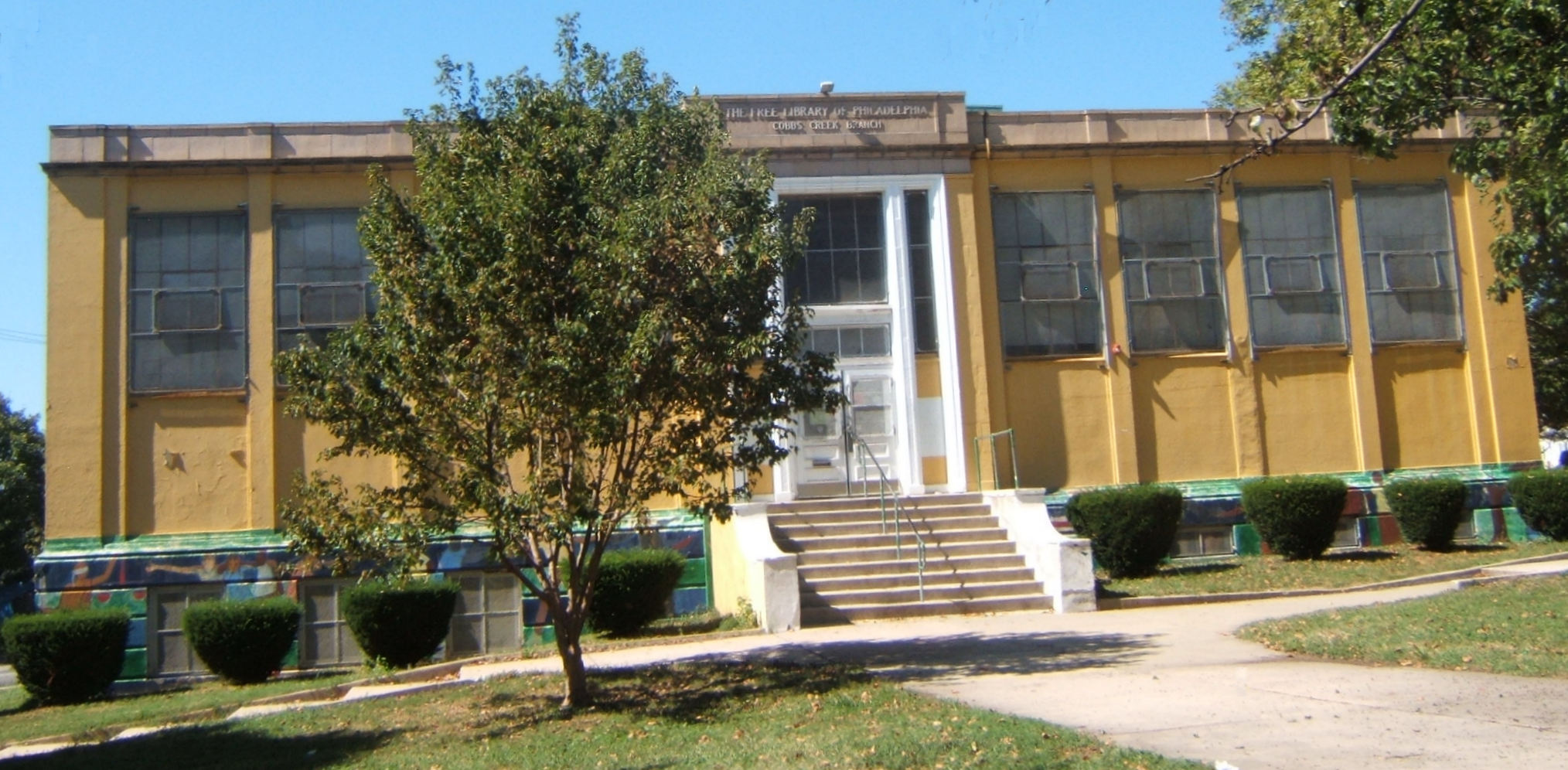
Cobb's Creek Library (1924), Philadelphia, Pennsylvania.

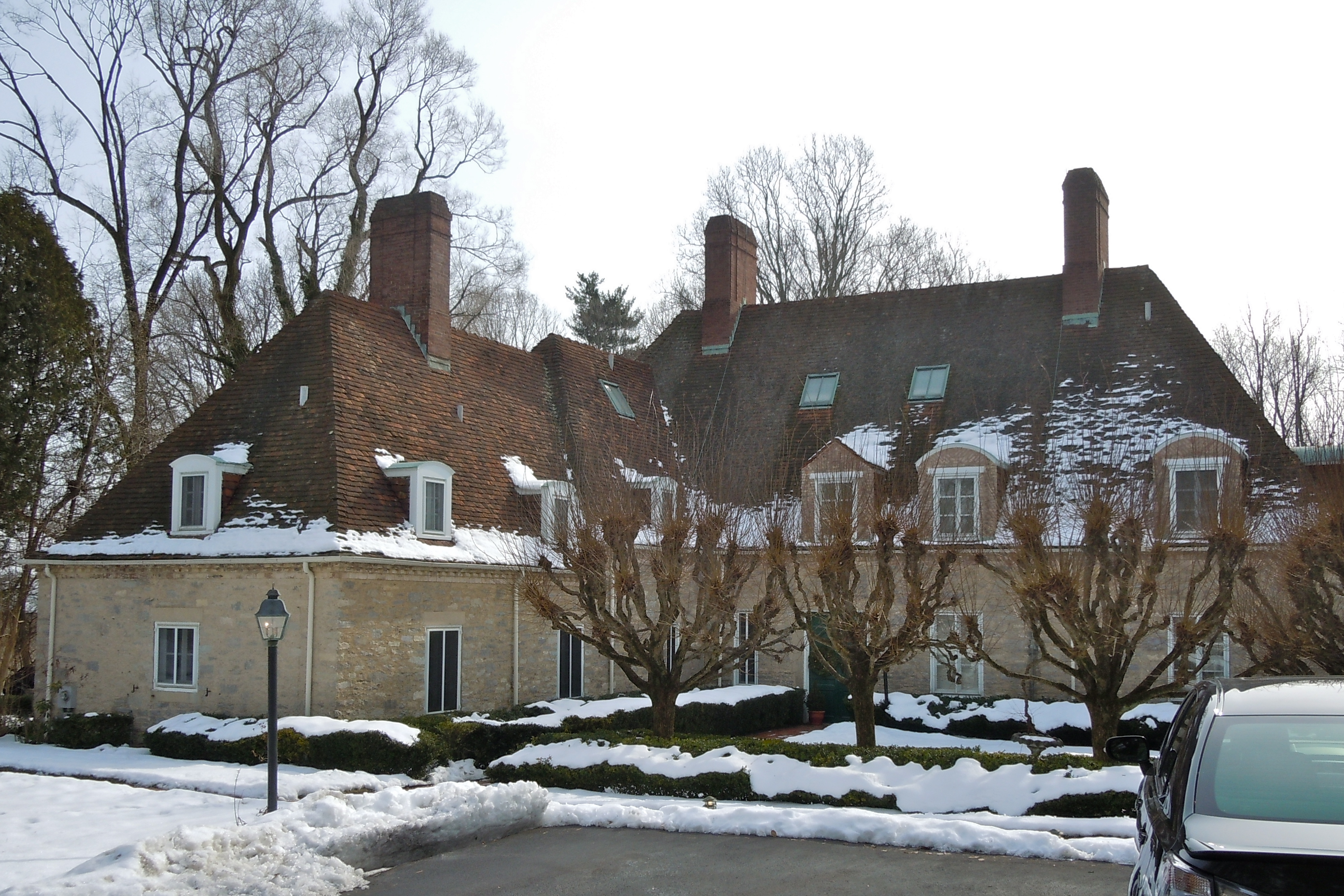
"Autun" (1928), West Whiteland, Pennsylvania.

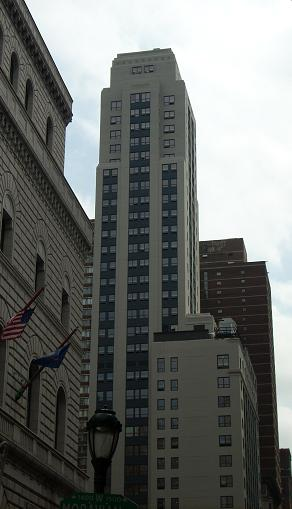
Lewis Tower (1929), Philadelphia, Pennsylvania.

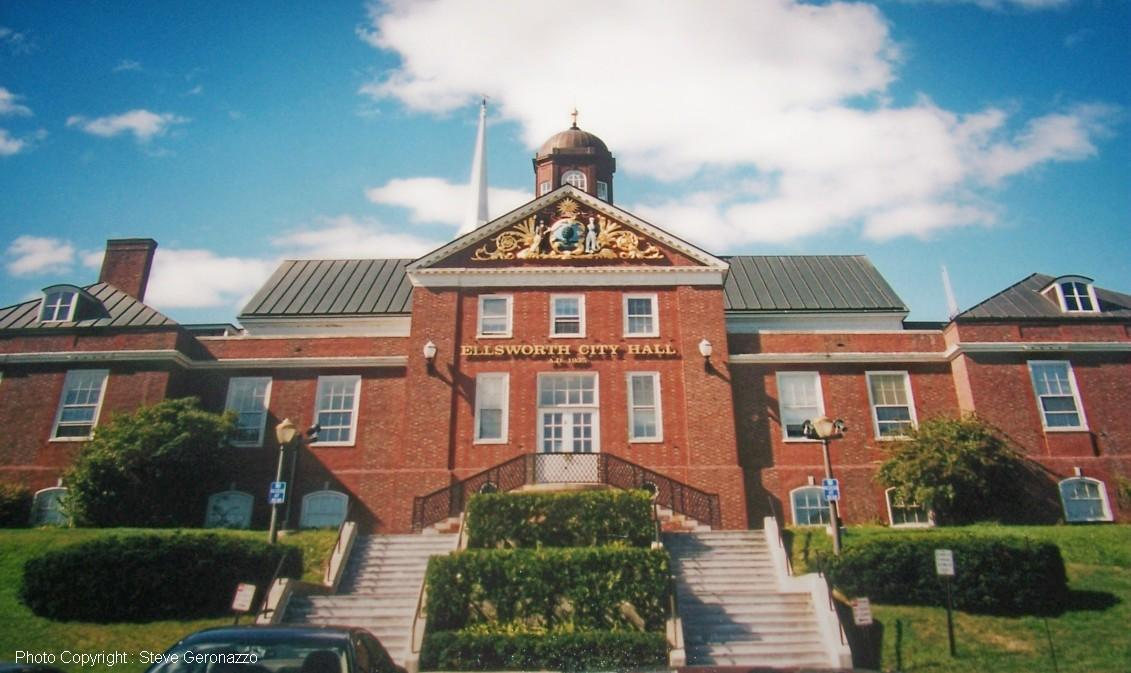
Ellsworth City Hall (1935), Ellsworth, Maine.

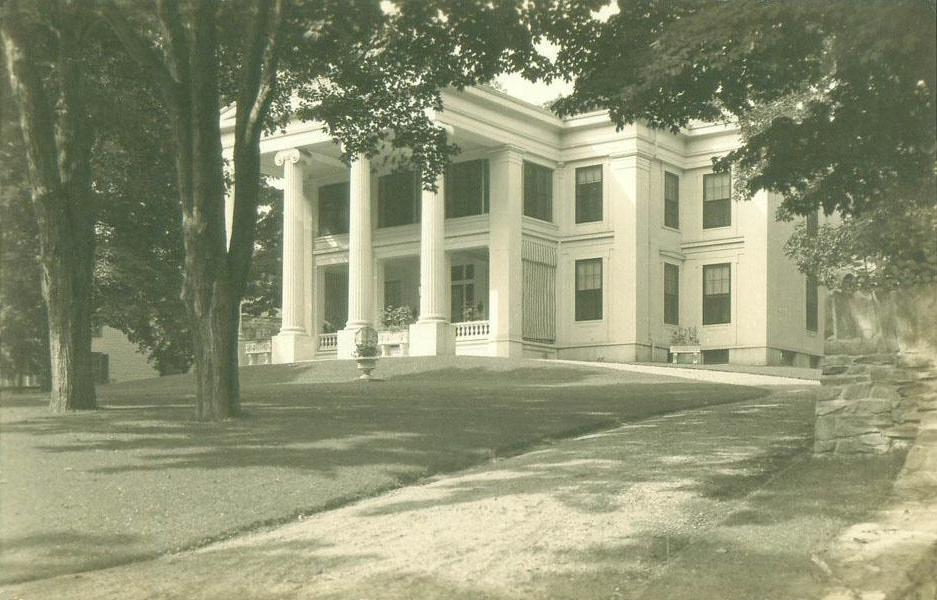
Williamson House, Belfast, Maine. Gilchrist designed alterations to this 1842 house.
