= Cedar Crest (Gladwyne, Pennsylvania) =

- Location within Pennsylvania

General information
- Type: historic district contributing property
- Location: 1543 Monk Road, Gladwyne, United States
- Coordinates: 40°02.72′N 75°15.83′W
- Opened: French-Norman; Edmund B. Gilchrist; John S. Cornell & Sons; 1928; 1931
- Owner: Private property

Website
- www.lindenhillgladwyne.com

Cedar Crest – originally known as "Dolobran II", and recently as "Linden Hill" – is a French-Norman-style mansion and estate at 1543 Monk Road in Gladwyne, Pennsylvania. Located on a hill overlooking the Schuylkill River, it was designed by architect Edmund B. Gilchrist, 1928–31. Best known as the former residence of Campbell's Soup-heir John T. Dorrance, Jr., it is a contributing property in the Mill Creek Historic District.

== Dolobran II ==
Gilchrist designed the estate for Rodman Ellison Griscom (1870–1944), a Philadelphia stockbroker and son of shipping magnate Clement Griscom. In the 1880s, the father had built a mansion and estate several miles away called "Dolobran," and the son named his estate "Dolobran II."

=== French Norman ===
Interest in French-Norman architecture grew in the early 20th century, prompted by American architects who had attended the École des Beaux-Arts in Paris, and veterans of World War I who had served in Europe. Its greatest exponent in the Philadelphia area was architect George Howe, whose own mansion, "High Hollow" (1914–17), is a significant example of the style. The Architectural League of New York awarded Howe's firm its 1925 Gold Medal for Excellence in Design for the French-Norman manor-and-farm, "Laverock" (1921–28, demolished), in Wyndmoor, Pennsylvania. But, in an influential review in The New Republic, critic Lewis Mumford denounced it as "architectural anaesthesia" and "hocus-pocus":

"The critical weakness of the romantic architect is that he is employed in creating an environment into which people may escape from a sordid workaday world, whereas the real problem of architecture is to remake the workaday world so that people will not wish to escape from it."

Gilchrist was best known for his English-Cotswold-style suburban houses in the Philadelphia neighborhood of Chestnut Hill. He had made alterations to the elder Griscom's estate in 1905, but the son's estate was the most ambitious single residence of his career. Gilchrist's "Dolobran II" can be seen as Howe's "Laverock" on an even grander scale – a late example of architecture as escapist fantasy.

=== Description ===
The buildings are grouped around two courtyards, 400 feet apart, connected by a cobbled lane. The entrance courtyard is asymmetrical, and its buildings evoke a storybook French village. It is dominated by the corner turret of the caretaker's house, and also features a 10-car garage, a barn with horse stalls, a sheepfold, a staff cottage, and other service buildings. One turns onto the lane and glimpses the manor house through the narrow portal between the main courtyard's twin gatehouses. A long greenhouse ran the length of the lane, until it was removed in the 1980s.

The main courtyard is a rigidly-symmetrical "court of honor," with a two-and-a-half-story manor house to the south, and what seem to be one-and-a-half-story ancillary buildings to the east and west. These are actually wings of the house, connected by curving one-story corridors. The master bedroom wing to the west contains a two-bedroom suite and library, and the service wing to the east contains the kitchen and breakfast room, with servant rooms above. The manor house features three first-floor rooms – the entrance hall, living room and dining room – and three bedrooms above. The gatehouses provide five additional guest bedrooms.

The 70-acre grounds included formal gardens, orchards, pastures and woods, two swimming pools, a tennis court, a duck pond, and an aviary, which was knocked down in 2025.

The estate was completed in 1931, at a reported cost of $700,000.

The Philadelphia Chapter of the American Institute of Architects awarded Gilchrist its 1929 Gold Medal for Excellence for "Dolobran II." Hundreds of drawings and photographs of the estate are in the Edmund Beaman Gilchrist Collection at the University of Pennsylvania. A set of blueprints is in the collection of the Athenaeum of Philadelphia.

== Cedar Crest ==
John T. Dorrance, Jr. (1919–1989) – son of the inventor of condensed soup, and chairman of the board of directors of Campbell's, 1962–84 – bought the estate following Rodman Griscom's death in 1944. He renamed it "Cedar Crest," the name of the farm that had occupied some of the land prior to Griscom's purchase. Dorrance filled the buildings with his collection of French Impressionist paintings, sculpture, and Chinese and Russian art. His family owned the property for more than fifty years.

Dorrance died in 1989, and in 1990 his Estate valued "Cedar Crest" at $10.5 million. Its contents – including paintings by Van Gogh, Manet, Degas and Picasso – were valued at over $129 million.

== Linden Hill ==
Robert Burch bought the estate in 1999 for $9.3 million. He changed its name to "Linden Hill."

In June 2013, he offered the buildings on 50.5 acres for sale, asking $24.5 million.

The property was delisted in December 2013, and relisted in May 2015 with Kurfiss Sotheby's International Realty for $19.5 million.

In 2022, the property was subdivided into five parcels, including 1543 Monk Road (Linden Hill), 1539 Monk Road (Linden Court), as well as three other lots, 1533, 1601, and 1611. In May of 2024, the main residence and Linden Court were offered to be sold at auction separately or together through an online auction conducted by Interluxe Auctions. The main residence was sold for $4.95 million in November 2024. Linden Court (now 1539 Monk Road) sold for $2.75 million in early 2025. Both properties combined covered 26.3 acres of land.
