= William W. Gilchrist =

American composer

William Wallace Gilchrist
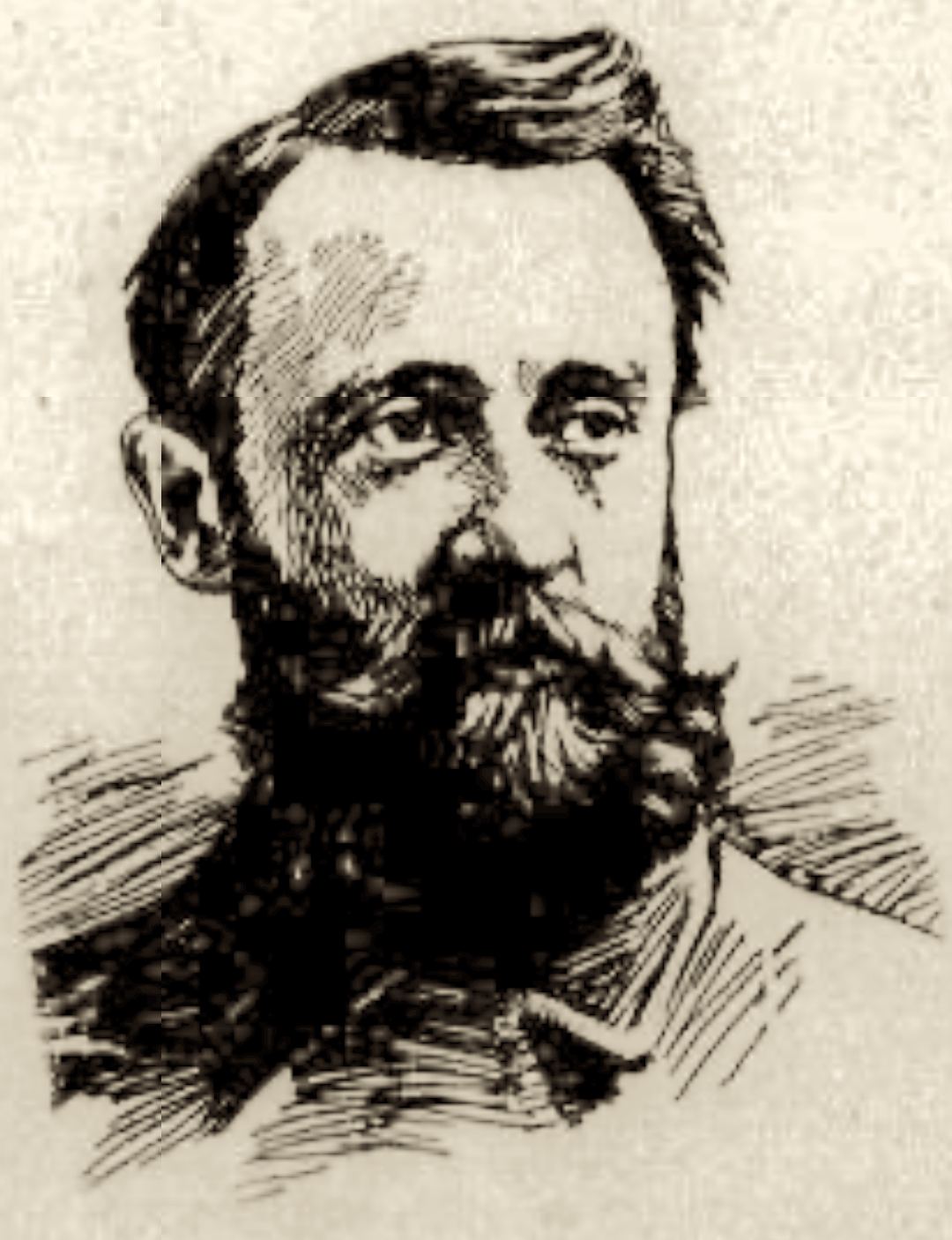

Background information
- Born: January 8, 1846; Jersey City, New Jersey, U.S.
- Died: December 20, 1916 (aged 70)
- Genres: Classical
- Occupation: Composer
- Instruments: Piano, strings, flute, clarinet, horn

William Wallace Gilchrist (January 8, 1846 – December 20, 1916) was an American composer and a major figure in nineteenth century music of Philadelphia. He founded the Mendelssohn Club of Philadelphia in 1874.

== Early life ==
Gilchrist was born in Jersey City, New Jersey to William Wallace Gilchrist and Redelia Ann (Cox) Gilchrist. At the age of eleven months he moved with his family to Philadelphia. His father's business suffered during the Civil War, so young Gilchrist turned to the law and to business for his own living, but eventually decided to take up music as a career.

== Career ==
From 1865 to 1868 Gilchrist studied privately with Hugh Archibald Clarke, later a Professor of Music at the University of Pennsylvania. With the exception of a short period in Cincinnati, Ohio (1871–1872), he lived in Philadelphia, where he was active as church organist, teacher, and leader of musical clubs. During this time was active as a baritone soloist at Holy Trinity Church on Rittenhouse Square and St. Mark's Church on Locust Street, soloist with the Handel and Haydn Society in productions of Messiah, Moses in Egypt and Judas Maccabaeus, and participant in a series of light operettas presented by the Amateur Drawing Room.

In 1871, he was appointed organist and choirmaster at St. Clement's Church, and he drew the original Mendelssohn Club members from the choir there.

In 1882, Gilchrist won the Cincinnati Festival Prize for his setting of the 46th Psalm, for soprano solo, chorus, and orchestra where the judges included Camille Saint-Saëns and Carl Reinecke. Among his other choral works are Ode to the Sun, Journey of Life, The Uplifted Gates, and Legend of the Bended Bow. He composed two non-programmatic symphonies, and some chamber music, including a nonet for piano, strings, flute, clarinet and horn.

In addition to Mendelssohn Club, Gilchrist also conducted the West Philadelphia Choral Society, the Germantown Choral Society, the Harmonia, the Harrisburg Choral Society and the Tuesday Club of Wilmington, Delaware. He was organist and choirmaster at St. Clement's, Christ Church in Germantown, and at the Swedenborgian Church of the New Jerusalem. He was a founding member of both Music Manuscript Society and the American Guild of Organists. He was the head of voice instruction at the Philadelphia Musical Academy, and from 1893 to 1899 he conducted the Symphony Society of Philadelphia.

Gilchrist was one of the very few American composers of this period who did not study in Europe. His pupils included Anna Priscilla Risher.

== Personal life ==
His son, William Wallace Gilchrist Jr. (1879–1926) was a noted painter who was active in Portland, Maine. His son, Edmund B. Gilchrist was a noted architect. Another son, Charles Gilchrist was a civil engineer and photographer for the National Geographic Society.
