= Autun (West Whiteland Township, Pennsylvania) =

Historic house in Pennsylvania, United States

- U.S. National Register of Historic Places
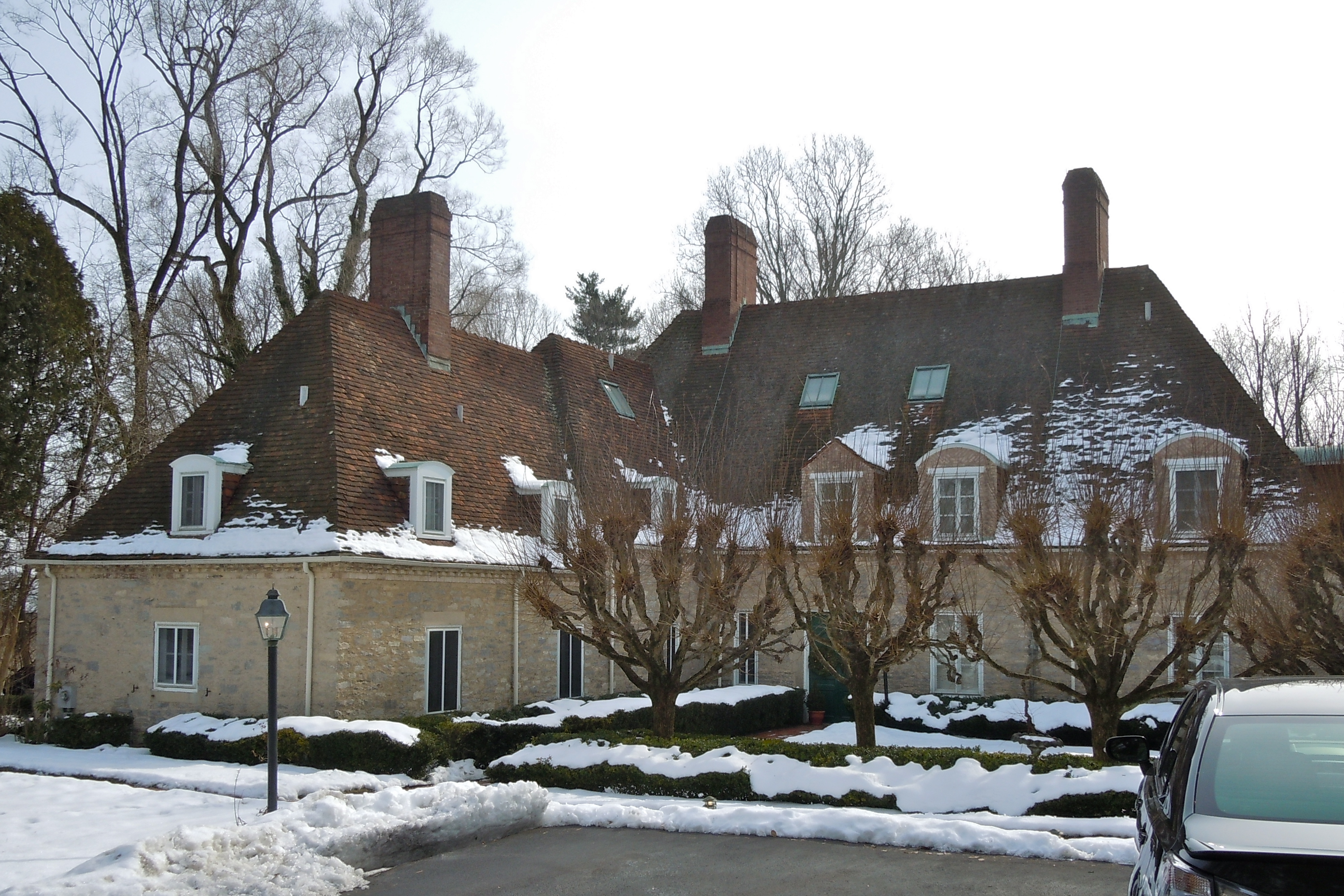
- Autun, January 2011

- Location within Pennsylvania Location within the United States
- Location: 371 E. Boot Rd., West Whiteland Township, Pennsylvania
- Coordinates: 40°0′39″N 75°36′21″W
- Area: 5 acres (2.0 ha)
- Built: 1928
- Architect: Edmund B. Gilchrist
- Architectural style: Neo-Norman
- MPS: West Whiteland Township MRA
- NRHP reference No.: 84003232
- Added to NRHP: September 6, 1984

Autun, also known as Meadowcourt, is a historic home located in West Whiteland Township, Pennsylvania, United States. Designed by the architect Edmund Beaman Gilchrist in 1928 and completed in 1929, it is a 1 1/2-story, French style, L-shaped country house.

It was listed on the National Register of Historic Places in 1984.

== History ==
Located on Boot Road in Chester County, Pennsylvania's West Whiteland Township, the historic residence originally called "Autun" and now known as "Meadowcourt," was built at the behest of insurance executive Benjamin Rush, II (1898-1975), a descendant of one of the signers of the Declaration of Independence, and his wife, Muriel (Bishop) Rush (1901-1992). Planned for the Rush family by architect Edmund B. Gilchrest in the French country-style in 1928, it was based on the design of a chateau in Autun, France that Gilchrest had toured prior to receiving his commission from the Rush family. Completed in 1929, it was subsequently owned by the Rush family for two decades before being sold to the artist and architect Silvio Pietrinferni and his wife, Frances.

Sold to Marcia Green during the early 1980s, portions of the historic home were rented out to various tenants by the middle to latter part of that decade, including to musician Kit Stewart.

In early January 1988, Autun/Meadowcourt became the subject of media coverage when area newspapers reported that the historic property had been proposed as a site for townhouse development by the KAT Partnership of Exton, Pennsylvania. Developers had signaled their intent to the West Whiteland Planning Commission to divide the house into two units and build several townhouses on the mansion's north side. Representatives of both the planning commission and the West Whiteland Historical Commission expressed concerns regarding the project's potential impact on the property's existing lawn and landscaping, as well as on the historic chateau itself. According to The Philadelphia Inquirer, the mansion, which faces Boot Street, "across a terrace and broad lawn" had a "sloped slate roof and two high chimneys" which were "barely visible from the road behind a row of trees" in 1988. Concord grapes grew "on gnarled vines across the front of the house, just above five French double doors and below five dormer windows." The property was also bordered by "European linden trees, imported by Mrs. Rush" and "required skilled pruning twice a year."

Autun/Meadowcourt was listed on the National Register of Historic Places in 1984.

== Architectural features ==
Autun/Meadowcourt, a 1 1/2-story, L-shaped country house built for Benjamin Rush, II, is situated on roughly seven acres of wooded and landscaped property opposite from the Colonial Revival-style home of Rush's parents.

Accessed from Boot Road via a narrow, curved driveway leading which reaches around and behind the home to a cul-de-sac, it was designed in the French architectural style, and features a steep hipped roof with multiple rounded and gabled dormers, which were hallmarks of its architect Edmund B. Gilchrist. Other design touches visible from the front include skylights, two chimneys and five French double doors. The main entrance, which is reached via a brick walkway at the back of the residence, opens into a large hall paved with white marble blocks that had been salvaged from Philadelphia's Hotel Colonnade prior to its destruction. Seven fireplaces were included by Gilchrist to ensure the comfort of the Rush family and their guests. During the late 1980s, the mansion still retained its original brass plumbing; its interior in 1988 was described by The Philadelphia Inquirer as follows:

"To the left [of the entrance] is a spiral staircase, carpeted in blue and flanked by a suit of armor. Beyond is a long formal dining room, decorated with original linen-backed wallpaper whose birds, ducks and flowers were hand-painted in China.
"Off the dining room, banks of glass-fronted cabinets line the pantry, which leads into the modernized kitchen and laundry. (Other than the kitchen remodeling, no structural changes have been made to the house since it was built, according to documents filed in 1982, when the house was submitted for inclusion on the National Register.)"

A narrow service stairway enabled servants to move easily between the kitchen and laundry room and their second-floor quarters, where an intercom box had been installed outside in the hallway.

The study, which took up a significant portion of the mansion's first floor, was paneled with hardwood flooring, accessible by three French doors, and designed with a fireplace and floor-to-ceiling bookcases, two sections of which were designed to "[swing] open, revealing secret passageways leading into the next room." The second floor's plan included four bedrooms and two fireplaces.
