= William W. Gilchrist Jr. =

American painter (1879–1926)

William Wallace Gilchrist Jr.
- Born: March 2, 1879; Philadelphia, Pennsylvania, U.S.
- Died: November 4, 1926 (aged 47); Brunswick, Maine, U.S.
- Other name: W. Wallace Gilchrist
- Education: Pennsylvania Academy of the Fine Arts
- Occupations: Painter, teacher
- Spouse: Lucretia Mott De Schweinitz (m. 1901–1926; his death)
- Children: 3
- Father: William W. Gilchrist
- Relatives: Edmund B. Gilchrist (brother)
- Awards: Third Hallgarten Prize (1908)

William Wallace Gilchrist Jr. (March 2, 1879 – November 4, 1926) was an American painter. He was known for his impressionist paintings of American domestic scenes, genre scenes, landscapes, and portraits.

== Early life and education ==
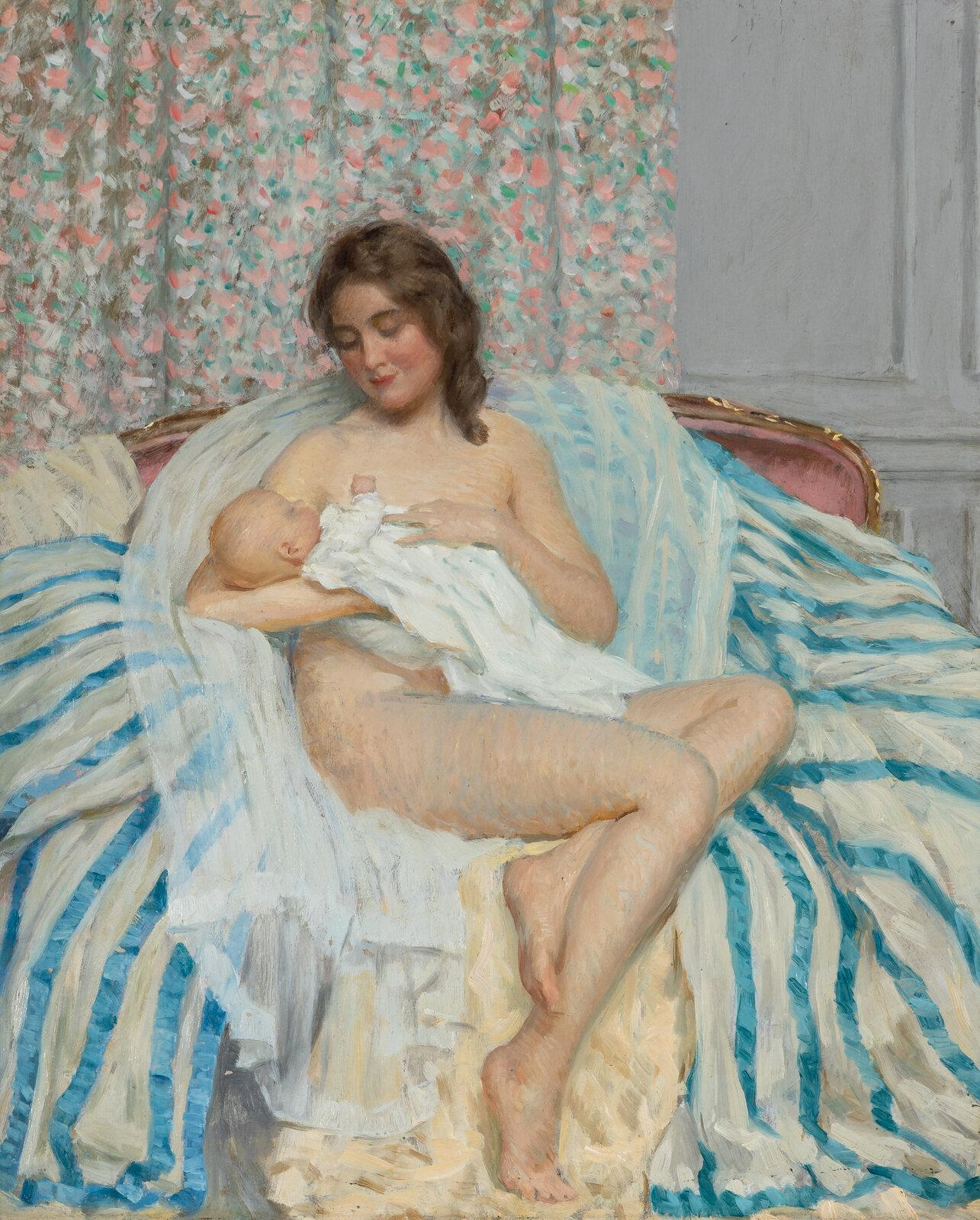
Maternity, 1917

William Wallace Gilchrist Jr. was born on March 2, 1879, in Philadelphia, Pennsylvania. His father was William W. Gilchrist Sr., a noted musician and composer and the founder the Mendelssohn Club of Philadelphia. His brother was Edmund B. Gilchrist, a noted architect. He began creating art in his youth.

Gilchrist studied at the Pennsylvania Academy of the Fine Arts in Philadelphia, where he was a student of Cecilia Beaux, Thomas Pollock Anshutz, and William Merritt Chase. He also took lessons from Winslow Homer during his summer vacations in Prout's Neck, Maine, and additionally studied in Paris, London, and Munich.

In December 1901, he married Lucretia Mott De Schweinitz, and together they had three children.

== Career ==
He was a member of the Salmagundi Club, Philadelphia Water Color Club, and Art Club of Philadelphia.

Gilchrist was awarded the Third Hallgarten Prize in 1908, for his painting Daughter and Doll. During the 1915 Panama–Pacific International Exposition (PPIE) in San Francisco, Gilchrist displayed a few of his landscape paintings.

During the summer months he spent time at Cliff Island, Maine. He painted a portrait of a model named Erminie, and took the funds from the painting to purchase a boat, which he named Erminie and he would sail around Casco Bay.

In 1915, he purchased a farmhouse and its surrounding islands in Quahog Bay, Maine, and he used the farmhouse as his art studio. In his late life he lived in Brunswick, Maine, starting in 1915. Gilchrist died of heart disease related issues on November 4, 1926, in Brunswick.

His grandson Robert Griffin authored, Affectionately, Wallace: The Life and Work of W. W. Gilchrist (2001).
