= Laura Kobayashi =

American violinist

Laura Kobayashi is an American violinist. She has performed in orchestras, chamber groups, and as a soloist. Formerly of the San Francisco Opera Orchestra, she has taught at several universities and currently leads a varied career as a performer and pedagogue, having performed as a soloist with the Seattle, Spokane, and Grand Junction symphonies.

== Career ==
=== Education ===
Kobayashi earned her Bachelor of Music from The Juilliard School, having studied under the renowned Dorothy DeLay. She went on to the Yale School of Music for her Master of Music then received her Doctor of Musical Arts from the University of Michigan in 1995, studying under Paul Kantor and Andrew Jennings.

=== Chamber music ===
Kobayashi has been a part of many chamber groups, most notably the Kobayashi/Gray Duo with pianist Susan Keith Gray and the Main Street Chamber Players. In 1993, the Kobayashi/Gray Duo won the USIA Artistic Ambassador audition, which led them touring through South America and the West Indies. They have also performed in South Africa, Thailand, Norway, and Wales. The duo focuses on music by women composers of the 19th-21st centuries, having recorded two albums featuring works by women composers under Albany Records. They have shared their experiences at American String Teachers Association conventions, the International Festival of Women Composers, the First International Conference on Women's Work in Music, and various other conferences.

=== Pedagogy ===
Kobayashi is one of the founding members of the Main Street Music Studios in Fairfax, Virginia, where she maintains a private studio of violin students and won the 2012 VASTA Outstanding String Teacher Award. She previously served on the faculties of West Virginia University (having won the 2002 “Excellence in Teaching” Award by the School of Music and College of Creative Arts), University of Nebraska Omaha, University of Georgia, and the Preparatory Division of the San Francisco Conservatory of Music.

== Albums ==
=== Boldly Expressive! (2000) ===
The Kobayashi/Gray Duo released Boldly Expressive! on April 21, 2000, an album featuring six works by Rebecca Clarke, Marie Grandval, Johanna Senfter, Serra Miyeun Hwang, Barbara Heller, and Grażyna Bacewicz. The CD includes four premier recordings: Clarke's Midsummer Moon, Grandval's Grande Sonate, Op.8 which Kobayashi edited for publication by Hildegard Publication Company in 1998, Senfter's Sech kleine Stücke für Violine mit Klavierbegleitung, Op. 13: Melodie and Elegie, and Hwang's Allegory. The disc was a culmination of ten years of joint research and performances by the Duo of music for violin and piano by women composers.

=== Feminissimo! (2008) ===
The Kobayashi/Gray Duo released Feminissimo! on December 1, 2008. The album consists of nine works by Meira Warshauer, Grażyna Bacewicz, Florence Price, Signe Lund, Anna Priscilla Risher, Emma Lou Diemer, Pauline Viardot, Vítězslava Kaprálová, and Elisenda Fábregas. The CD includes four premier recordings: Lund's Barcararolle, Op. 33, No. 1, Risher's Mazurka Brilliante, Diemer's Before Spring, and Fábregas' Sonata No. 1. The disc is a mixture of Romantic and contemporary character pieces and sonatas written by composers of Spanish, French, Norwegian, American, African-American, Polish, Czech and Jewish-American heritages.
