= Anna Priscilla Risher =

American classical musician and composer (1875–1946)

- Born: November 2, 1875; Dravosburg, Pennsylvania, U.S.
- Died: August 29, 1946 (aged 70); La Crescenta, California, U.S.
- Education: Pennsylvania College for Women; New England Conservatory of Music
- Occupations: pianist; organist; composer; painter
- Years active: 1910s–1940s
- Employer: Cumnock School for Girls
- Style: Classical; chamber
- Musical career
- Label: Albany

Anna Priscilla Risher (November 2, 1875 – August 29, 1946) was an American pianist, organist, composer, and later, a painter.

== Early life ==
A native of Dravosburg, Pennsylvania, Risher first studied music with William Wallace Gilchrist and Alexander Matthews. She attended the Pennsylvania College for Women, undertaking further studies at the New England Conservatory of Music; at the latter, her instructors included Adolph M. Foerster, Carl Stasny, George Whitefield Chadwick, and Leo Schulz. Returning to Pittsburgh, she worked as an organist at such venues as the East Liberty Presbyterian Church and Bethany Lutheran Church, and taught music as well; among her pupils was Charles Wakefield Cadman.

Risher's family moved to California in 1918, and she became the director of music at the Cumnock School for Girls in Los Angeles. She settled in the community of Laguna Beach and soon took up painting in addition to her musical activities. She continued to compose, and worked as well as the director of music for St. James' Episcopal Church. She organized a string quartet which bore her own name, and in 1933, organized the Hollywood Woman's Symphony Orchestra, a group of fifty musicians. She also organized the Laguna Beach Little Symphony Orchestra, some of whose concerts she conducted, and chaired programming for the Society for the Advancement of American Music.

== Works ==
Risher had a long publishing association with the magazine The Etude, published by Theodore Presser; her piano work "Indian Lament" received a prize offered by the Presser publishing house. In total, she composed some 350 pieces. Much of her output is chamber music, but she produced a number of larger-scale works as well, including a piano concerto. She also wrote a number of pedagogical works. Four of Risher's pieces for piano trio – "Andante Religioso", "Berceuse", "Mazurka", and "From the West" – were recorded by the Rawlins Piano Trio and released on Albany Records. A "Mazurka Brilliante" for violin and piano was recorded by Laura Kobayashi and Susan Keith Gray and released on Albany as well. Additionally, a short work entitled "Boblink" was recorded by members of the New York Philharmonic under Henry Hadley as part of an educational series of records published by Ginn & Company.

Risher died in La Crescenta, California.
