= High Hollow =

Building in Pennsylvania, United States

- Location within Pennsylvania

General information
- Type: Residence
- Architectural style: Neo-Norman
- Location: Philadelphia, Pennsylvania, 101 West Hampton Road, United States
- Coordinates: 40.0790°N 75.2226°W
- Completed: 1917
- Client: George Howe

Design and construction
- Architect: George Howe

High Hollow, also known as the George Howe House, is a historic Chestnut Hill residence in Northwest Philadelphia designed and built by American architect George Howe.

== Design ==
High Hollow's design is derived in-part from Howe's thesis while studying under Victor Laloux at the École des Beaux-Arts in France. Initial construction began in 1914, while Howe was apprenticed with the Philadelphia-based architecture firm Furness, Evans & Co., and was completed in 1917, during his time with Mellor Meigs & Howe.

The design is of European influence, specifically Neo-Norman. A local quarry was even reopened, just to supply the purplish stone used in its construction.

Bordering Fairmount Park and overlooking the Wissahickon Valley, High Hollow is often regarded as Howe's most significant residential work and viewed by many as setting the standard for house design in the region through the early 20th Century. Famed architect and educator Robert A. M. Stern referred to the house as being "often imitated" and "never surpassed" by those that came to design in a similar style.

Renowned American blacksmith Samuel Yellin, who was frequently commissioned by Mellor, Miegs & Howe, fabricated all of the intricate metalwork at the estate.

== Other occupants ==
When Howe departed Mellor, Meigs & Howe in 1928, he sold High Hollow to cigar magnate Samuel Paley (founder of La Palina) and his wife, Goldie Paley, an accomplished artist and philanthropist. The Paleys were the parents of William S. Paley, who would later play a central role in establishing the Columbia Broadcasting System as the largest radio and television network in the United States.

The Paley family resided at High Hollow for two decades. During their tenure, they commissioned the addition of an Art Deco lounge distinguished by striking photographic murals celebrating the spirit of modernity and the dynamism of 20th-century transportation. In subsequent years, the property was donated to the University of Pennsylvania, which later conveyed it to a private owner.

From 1995 to 2005, the house was owned by Drs. Martha Camilo and Dr.Lewis Little. During this period, Lewis Little authored The Theory of Elementary Waves, a scientific work examining the nature of light, written while residing at High Hollow. It is "A critique of quantum theory, including Heisenberg's Uncertainty Principle, Bell's Theorem, the “double-slit” experiment and such topics as “dark matter.” An entire chapter on how TEW provides a physical explanation of Einstein's theory of relativity."

With the assistance of architect Federico Camilo, the owners undertook a careful stewardship of the property, preserving the house as closely as possible to its original form while sustaining it as the center of family life.

It was during this period that Architect Camilo articulated an architectural manifesto of Retro-Futurism, inspired by the house’s compelling dialogue between tradition and modernity. This intellectual position was informed by the home’s layered architectural character, most notably the central staircase, whose restrained geometry and minimalist spatial qualities introduced a pronounced modernist overtone within the otherwise historically rooted interior. The staircase became emblematic of the house’s ability to reconcile forward-looking design thinking with architectural heritage.

The Camilo family, originally from the Dominican Republic, traces its lineage to Dominican founding father Jacinto De La Concha. Following the death of family patriarch DR.Rafael Camilo Simó, the house was sold in 2005. In 2016, the property was offered at a sheriff’s auction and acquired by Melissa Epperly, a longtime admirer of High Hollow and its architectural legacy. Guided by the original design philosophy and intellectual direction established by Howe, she approached the restoration with deep respect for the house’s architectural intent. Her work was informed not only by historical documentation but also by a careful reading of the building itself, allowing the original ideas embedded in the structure to shape contemporary interventions.

The restoration was executed with the involvement of master craftsmen of the highest caliber, whose expertise ensured that traditional materials, construction techniques, and finishes were treated with exceptional care and precision. This collaborative effort resulted in a comprehensive and sensitive preservation project, encompassing significant structural and systems restoration, including upgrades to electrical, heating, cooling, gas, and water infrastructure. The renovation further included detailed paint stratigraphy analysis to accurately reestablish original historic color palettes. In recognition of this exemplary commitment to historic preservation, the project received the Chestnut Hill Conservancy Preservation Award in 2021.

== See also ==
- Glenays - The addition (1925) and garden walls (1928) were designed by George Howe.
