= Lewis Tower =

Building in Philadelphia, Pennsylvania

Aria
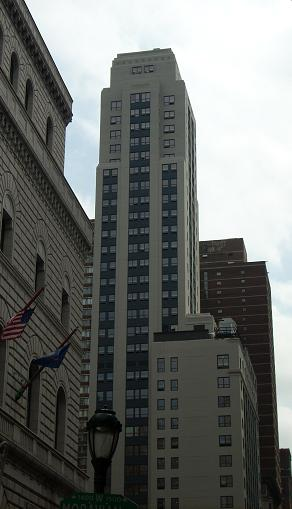

- Location within Philadelphia Lewis Tower (Pennsylvania) Lewis Tower (the United States)

General information
- Status: Completed
- Type: Residential
- Location: 225 South 15th Street, Philadelphia, Pennsylvania, United States
- Coordinates: 39.9486°N 75.1660°W
- Opening: 1929
- Cost: 35 million
- Owner: Richard Oller and Jeffrey Goldstein

Height
- Roof: 389 ft (119 m)

Technical details
- Floor count: 33
- Floor area: 184,999 sq ft (17,187.0 m^{2})

Design and construction
- Architect: Edmund Gilchrist
- Developer: GoldOller Associates LLC.
- Structural engineer: Gravell & Hall
- Main contractor: Frank V. Warren Company

Aria (formerly known as the Lewis Tower Building) is a 33-story Art Deco skyscraper in Center City Philadelphia designed by the firm Edmund Gilchrist.

== History and architectural features ==
An exceptionally slender building, is historic structure was one of the city's tallest office high-rises until the skyscraper boom of the late 1980s. It housed offices until 2005 when the building was sold for conversion into condominiums. Currently, the property is managed by Madison Parke.

The building has undergone extensive interior remodeling and exterior renovation (including facade scrubbing and treatment) and has been renamed Aria, a nod to the building's location just off the Avenue of the Arts, Philadelphia's premier performing arts corridor.

The Aria was purchased in 2009 by Richard Oller and Jeffrey Goldstein.

== See also ==
- List of tallest buildings in Philadelphia
