= Mill Creek Historic District (Bryn Mawr and Gladwyne, Pennsylvania) =

Historic district in Pennsylvania, United States

- U.S. National Register of Historic Places
- U.S. Historic district
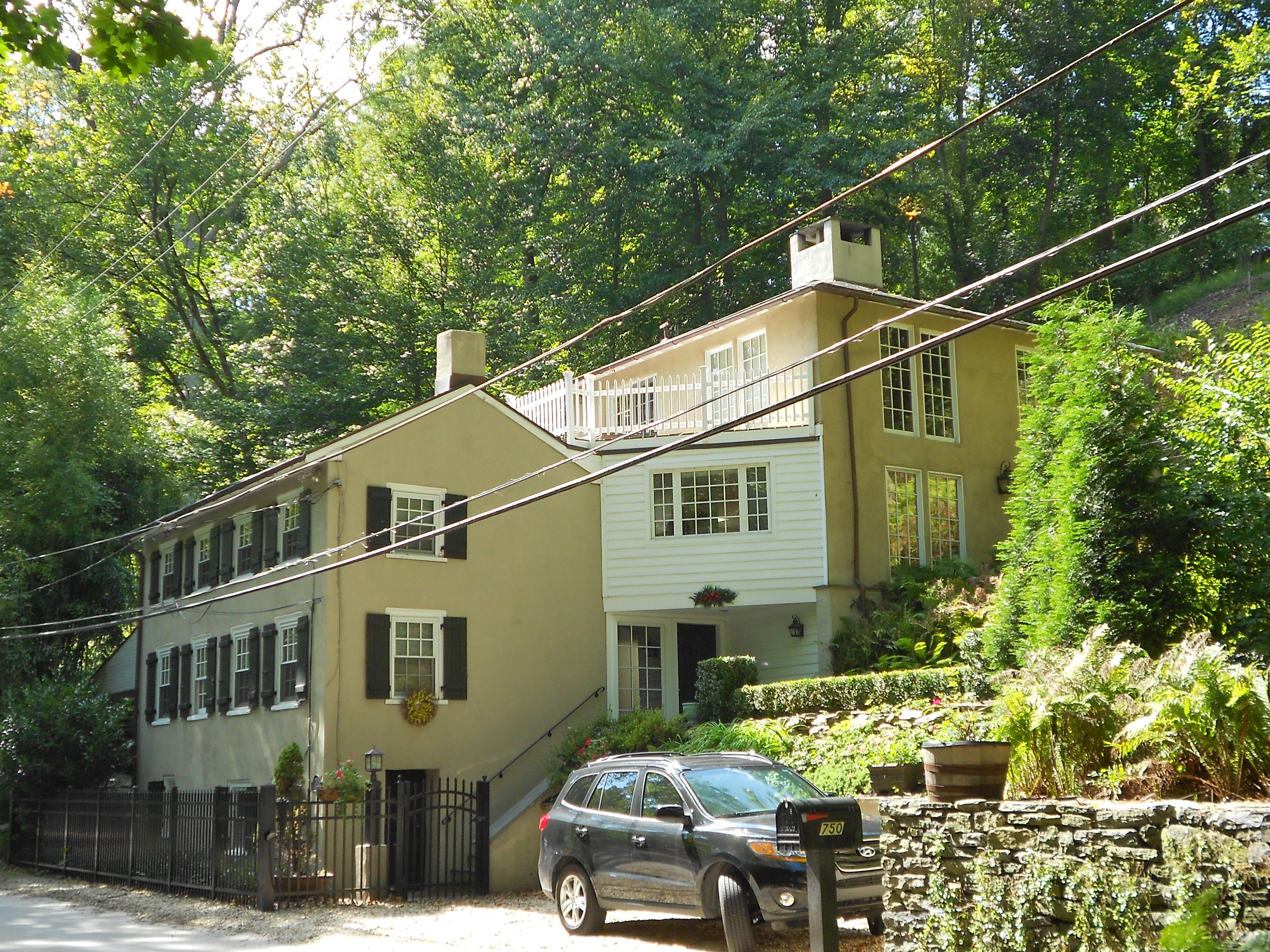

- Location within Pennsylvania
- Location: Near Bryn Mawr and Gladwyne, Pennsylvania
- Coordinates: 40°1′32″N 75°17′8″W
- Built: 1690, 1894
- Architect: Walter K. Durham, Edmund B. Gilchrist
- Architectural style: Georgian, Federal, Tudor Revival, Colonial
- NRHP reference No.: 80003575, 96000965
- Added to NRHP: December 10, 1980; August 30, 1996 (increase)

The Mill Creek Historic District near Bryn Mawr and Gladwyne, Pennsylvania, United States, is a historic district that was listed on the National Register of Historic Places on December 10, 1980. The area of the historic district was increased on August 30, 1996.

The area is roughly bounded by the Schuylkill River, Mill Creek, Righter's Mill, Rose Glen, and Monk's Rds.

== See also ==
- National Register of Historic Places listings in Montgomery County, Pennsylvania
- Cedar Crest (Gladwyne, Pennsylvania)
