= Glenays =

Historic house in Pennsylvania, United States

- U.S. National Register of Historic Places
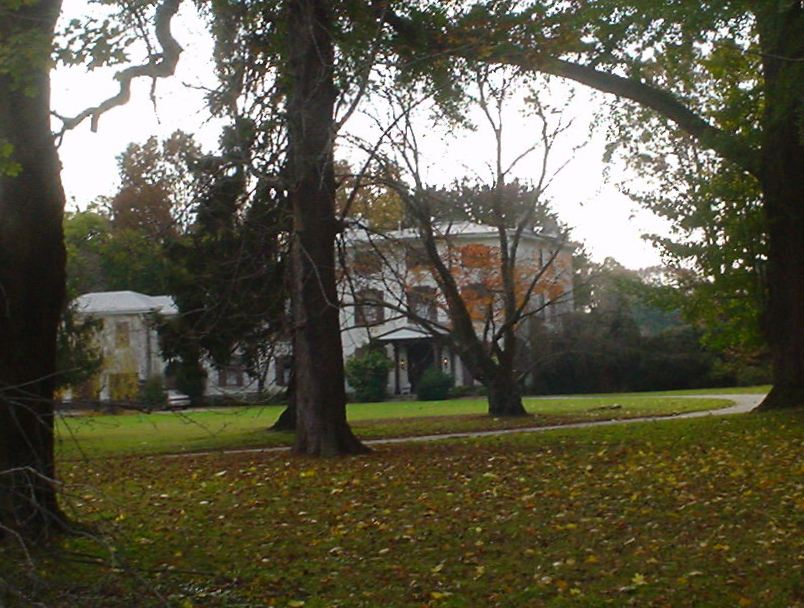
- Glenays, November 2009
- Interactive map showing Glenays’ location
- Location: 926 Coopertown Rd., Bryn Mawr, Pennsylvania
- Coordinates: 40°0′41″N 75°19′49″W
- Area: 2.5 acres (1.0 ha)
- Built: 1859, c. 1890, 1925
- Built by: Erickson, Michael
- Architect: Howe, George
- Architectural style: Italianate
- NRHP reference No.: 77001163
- Added to NRHP: December 27, 1977

Glenays, also known as Leighton House, was an historic home which was located in Radnor Township, Delaware County, Pennsylvania.

It was added to the National Register of Historic Places in 1977.

== History and architectural features ==
The property was purchased by Richard Roger Montgomery and his wife Elisabeth Binney Montgomery in 1859. It was a three-story, stucco over stone Italian Villa style dwelling built in three sections.

The first section was built in 1859, with additions built in the late-nineteenth century and in 1925. The 1925 addition and 1928 garden walls were designed by architect George Howe (1886–1955).

For many years, the estate was the home of Archibald R. Montgomery and later, the residence of Mr. and Mrs. Alexander Biddle. In 1974, it was used as the "Designers' Show House" by the Philadelphia Vassar Club to benefit their scholarship fund.

As of 2017, it was abandoned and in a state of disrepair. As of 2021, the land was subdivided, and the mansion demolished to make way for new residential construction.
