= George Howe (architect) =

American architect and educator (1886–1955)

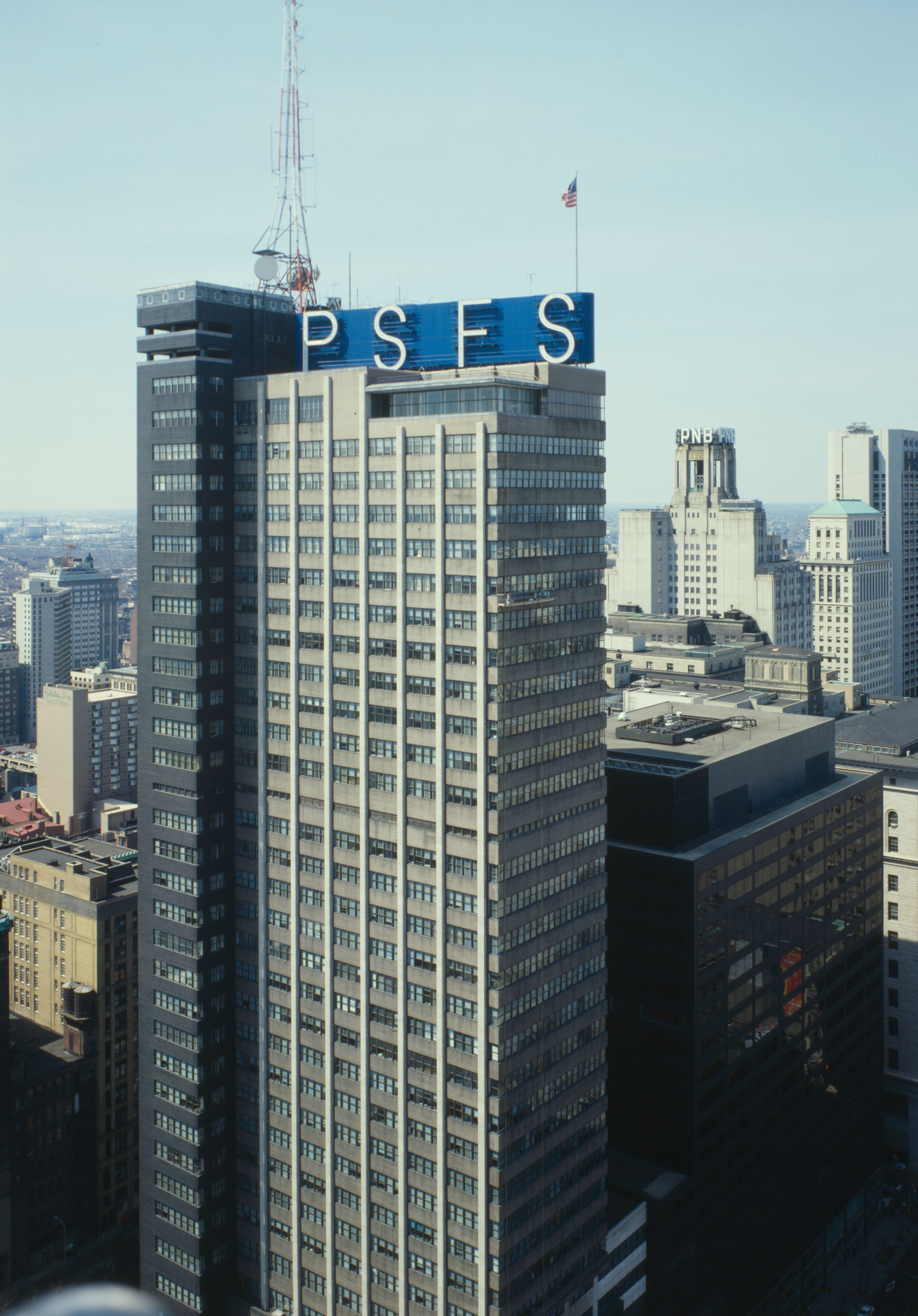
Philadelphia Savings Fund Society Building (1930-32), Philadelphia, Pennsylvania, Howe & Lescaze, architects.

George Howe (1886–1955) was an American architect and educator, and an early convert to the International style. His personal residence, High Hollow (1914-1917), established the standard for house design in the Philadelphia region through the early 20th century. His partnership with William Lescaze yielded the design of Philadelphia's PSFS Building (1930–32), considered the first International style skyscraper built in the United States.

== Biography ==
He was born in Worcester, Massachusetts in 1886 to James and Helen Howe. He received his Bachelor of Architecture from Harvard in 1908, and graduated from the École des Beaux-Arts in 1912. He worked for the Philadelphia firm of Furness, Evans & Co. from 1913 to 1916.

In 1916, he joined the partnership of Walter Mellor & Arthur Ingersoll Meigs. He served in the military from 1917 to 1919, during World War I. Mellor Meigs & Howe's commissions were mostly residential and minor commercial buildings, with Bryn Mawr College's Goodhart Hall (1926–29), a Neo-Gothic auditorium, being their largest commission of the 1920s.

He left in 1928, and in 1929 formed a partnership with William Lescaze, a younger Swiss architect who had studied at ETH Zurich, and had first hand knowledge of the European avant-garde. Their collaboration yielded the landmark PSFS Building in Philadelphia. The partnership of Howe & Lescaze was dissolved in 1932.

After leaving Howe & Lescaze, Howe designed several private residences in the Philadelphia area. Throughout the late 1930s, Howe collaborated with Louis Kahn at the Philadelphia Housing Authority; and again in 1940, along with Oscar Stonorov, on the design of housing developments in other parts of Pennsylvania.

Howe was Architect in Residence at the American Academy in Rome from 1947 to 1949 and Chair of the Architectural Department at Yale from 1950 to 1954. In 1951 he was elected into the National Academy of Design as an Associate Academician.

He is buried with family members in the Mount Auburn Cemetery, Cambridge, Massachusetts.

== Selected works ==
- "High Hollow" (George Howe mansion), Chestnut Hill, Philadelphia, Pennsylvania (1914–17).
- "Ropsley" (Francis S. McIlhenny mansion), 8765 Montgomery Avenue, Wyndmoor, Pennsylvania (1916–18), Mellor, Meigs & Howe.
- "Laverock" (Arthur E. Newbold Jr. mansion), Willow Grove Avenue, Wyndmoor, Pennsylvania (1921–28, demolished), Mellor, Meigs & Howe. Won the Architectural League of New York's 1925 Gold Medal for Excellence in Design.
- Alterations to "Glenays" (Michael Erickson mansion), 926 Coopertown Road, Radnor Township, Pennsylvania (1925–28), Mellor, Meigs & Howe.
- "Oxmoor" (Orville H. Bullitt mansion), Skippack Pike, Whitemarsh, Pennsylvania (1926), Mellor, Meigs & Howe.
- Robert C. McLean mansion, Sheaff Lane, Whitemarsh, Pennsylvania (1927–29), Mellor, Meigs & Howe.
- Alterations to Riggs-Riley House, 3038 N Street NW, Washington, D.C. (1930).
- Philadelphia Savings Fund Society Building, Philadelphia, Pennsylvania (1930–32), with William Lescaze.
- "Square Shadows" (William Stix Wasserman house), 6024 Butler Pike, Whitemarsh, Pennsylvania (1932–34). Now Gloria Dei Lutheran Church.
- Robert F. Welsh house, 7802 Cobden Road, Cheltenham, Pennsylvania (1934–35).
- Alterations to Philadelphia Bulletin Building, NE corner Juniper & Filbert Streets, Philadelphia, Pennsylvania (1937–43, demolished), with Louis Erhardt McAllister.
- Alterations and additions to Chapel Hill, Berryville, Virginia (1938-1941).
- Carver Court, housing development in Coatsville, Pennsylvania (1944).
