= Berks County Courthouse =

Skyscraper in Reading, Pennsylvania, US

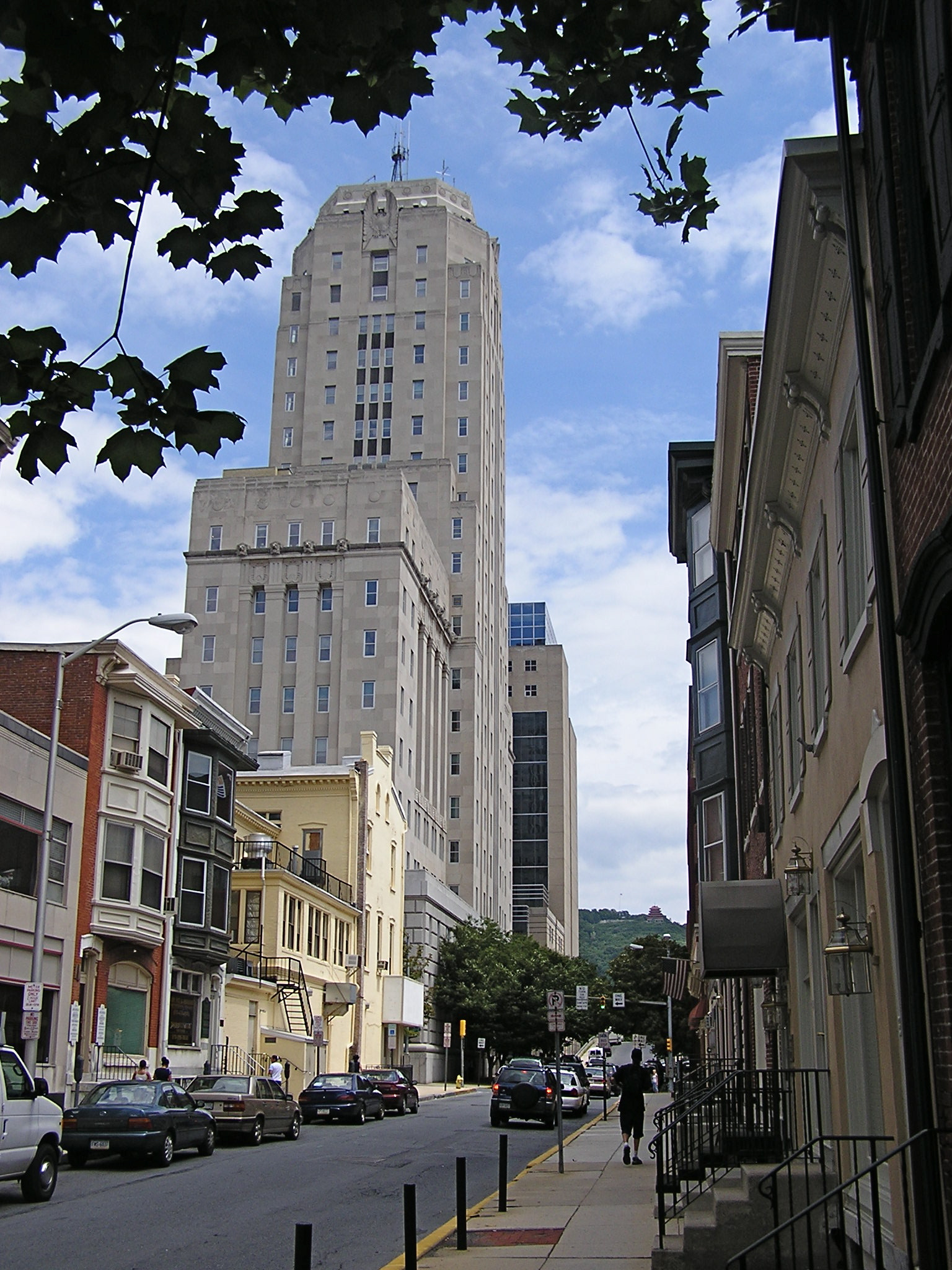
- Reading Center, Pennsylvania; with the Berks County Courthouse on the left; July 2007 Berks County Courthouse in 2007
- Interactive map of the Berks County Courthouse area

General information
- Status: Completed
- Type: Government
- Architectural style: Art Deco
- Location: 633 Court Street, Reading, Pennsylvania, United States
- Coordinates: 40°20′10.98″N 75°55′31.29″W
- Completed: 1932

Height
- Roof: 275 ft (84 m)

Technical details
- Floor count: 22

Design and construction
- Architect: Miles B. Dechant

The Berks County Courthouse is a 275 ft (84 m) tall art deco style courthouse located on 633 Court Street in Downtown Reading, Pennsylvania. The building has 22 floors and was built in 1932. Upon its completion, it became the tallest building in Reading, surpassing the Wyndham Reading which was built in 1929. The building is one of the few examples of art deco architecture in Reading; it also was the first skyscraper art deco "temple of justice" in the United States.

The building is one of the three courthouses that were built in Reading, with the second courthouse which was built in 1841, being demolished in the Spring of 1931 to make way for the current courthouse. In the 1930s, the top of the building would begin to be used as a weather beacon, which was illuminated up at night, however, due to multiple issues, the top of the building no longer lights up at night.

The building underwent restorations in the 1990s.

The building was designed by local architect, Miles B. Dechant.

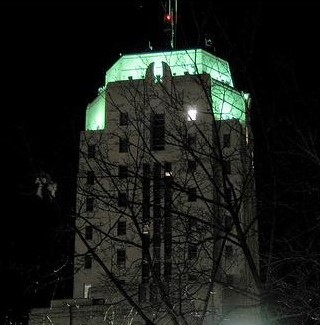
The top of the building illuminated in 2009

== See also ==
- List of tallest buildings in Pennsylvania
- PPL Building
- Pagoda (Reading, Pennsylvania)
- Philadelphia City Hall
- Comcast Technology Center
- Medical Arts Building (Reading, Pennsylvania)
- Metropolitan Edison Building
- Berks County Trust Company building
- Equestrian statue of David McMurtrie Gregg
- Goggleworks
- 1818 Market Street
- 333 Market Street (Harrisburg, Pennsylvania)
