= List of tallest buildings in Reading, Pennsylvania =

Skyline of Reading
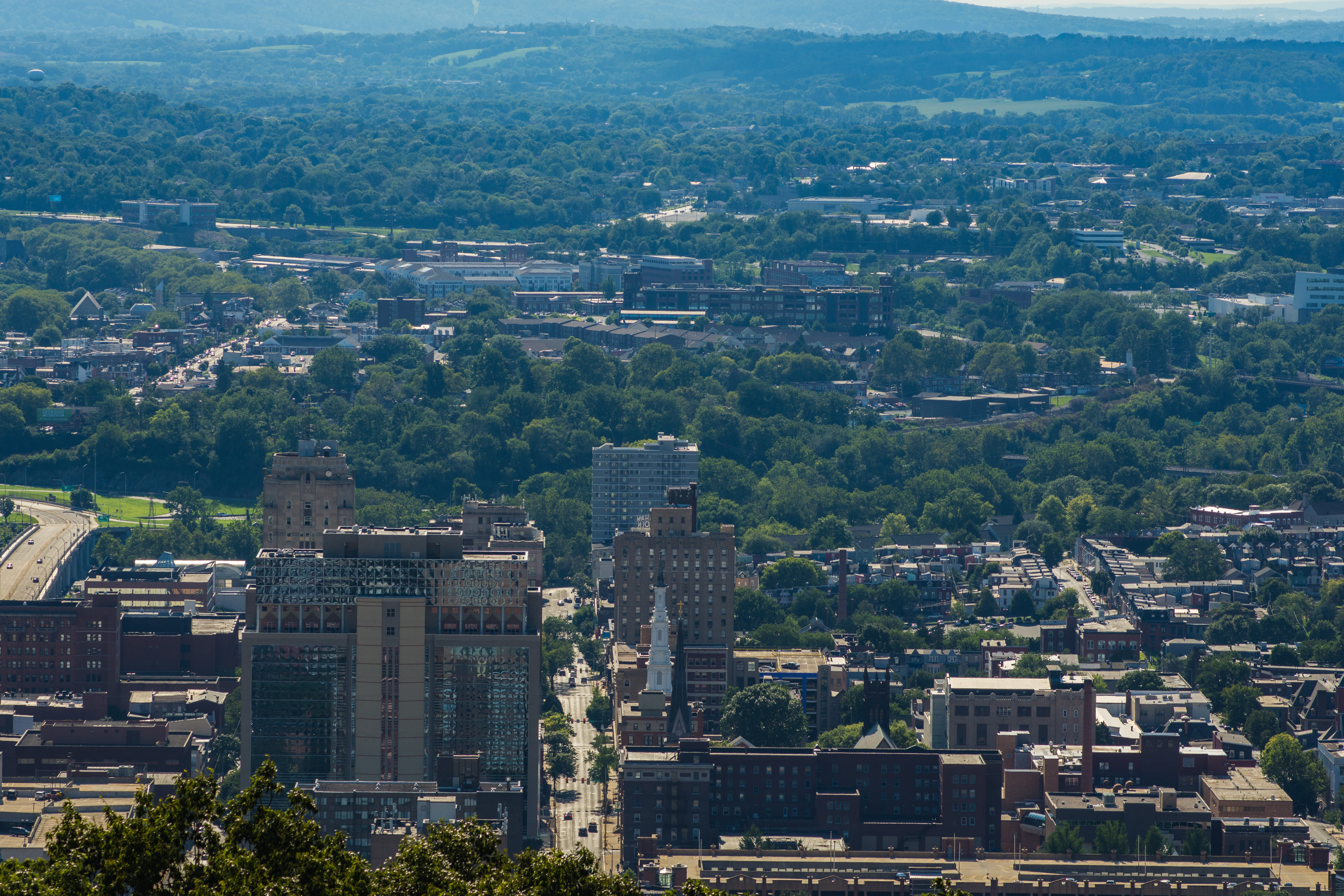
- The skyline of Reading in 2023
- Tallest building: Berks County Courthouse (1932)
- Tallest building height: 275 ft (84 m)

Number of tall buildings
- 10 stories or more: 16
- 20 stories or more: 1
- Taller than 50 m (164 ft): 8
- Taller than 75 m (246 ft): 1

Number of tall buildings — feet
- Taller than 200 ft (61.0 m): 4

Reading is the 4th-largest city in the U.S. state of Pennsylvania. As of March 2026, the city has a population of 96,508 people. The city currently has 17 buildings which stand over 130 ft (40 m) tall. The tallest building in Reading as of 2026 is the 275 ft (84 m) tall, Berks County Courthouse which has 22 floors and was built in 1932. The 2nd-tallest building in Reading as of 2026 is the 242 ft (74 m) tall, Berks County Services Center which has 16 floors and was built in 1992, it also is the most recently completed high-rise in the city to stand over 130 ft (40 m).

== Map of tallest buildings ==
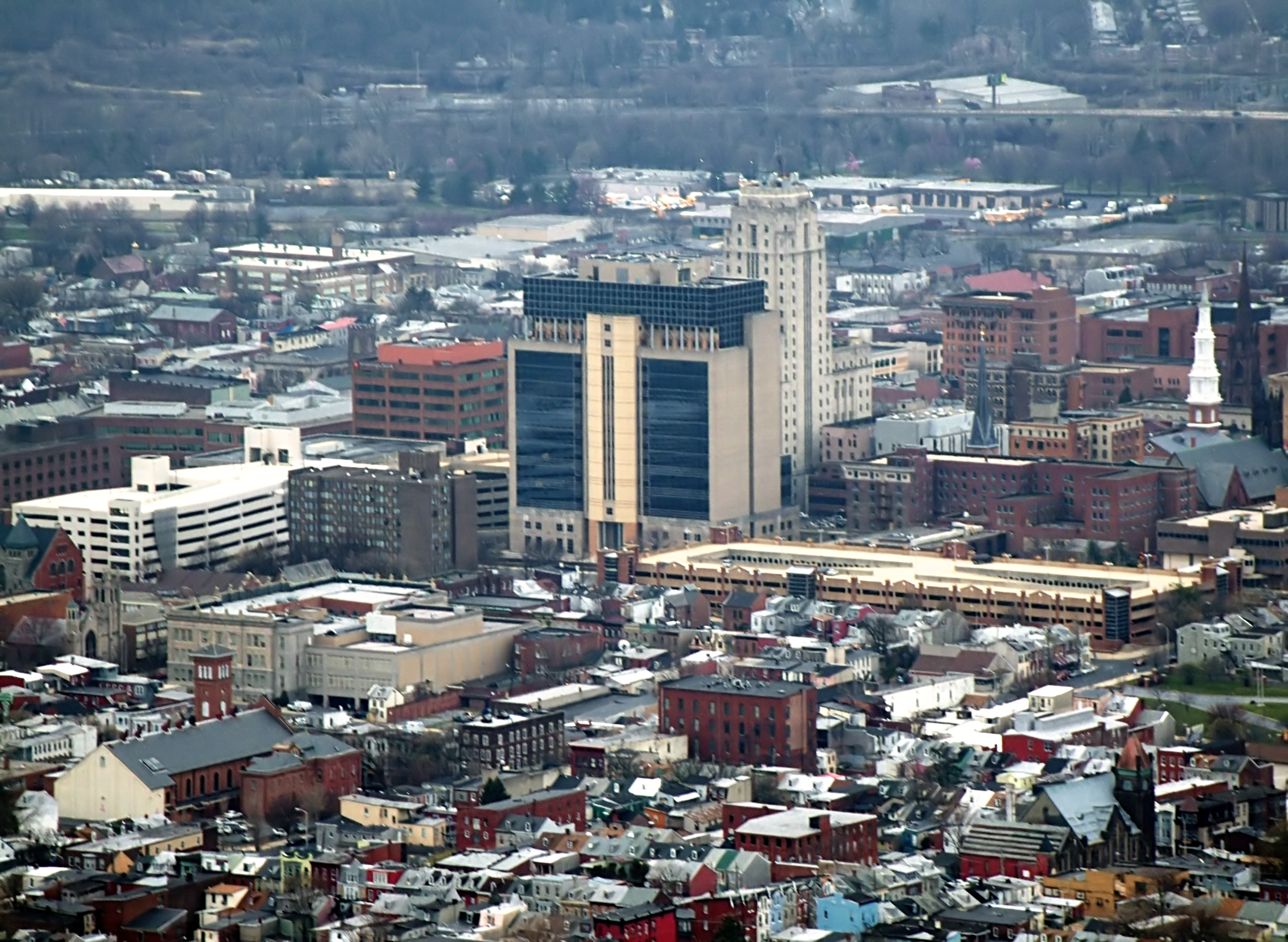
The skyline of Reading in 2011

The map below shows the locations of the buildings in Reading that stand over 130 ft (40 m) in height. Each marker is given a number based on the buildings ranking in the list. The color of each marker represents the decade that the building was completed in. Most of the tallest buildings in Reading are located in the Downtown, except for the Reading Elderly Housing, St. Mary's Roman Catholic Church, Episcopal House of Reading, George M. Rhodes Apartments, Dwight D. Eisenhower Apartments, and St. Peter the Apostle Roman Catholic Church.

Buildings in Reading that stand over 130 ft (40 m).
- 1950s and before
- 1960s
- 1970s
- 1980s
- 1990s
- 2000s
- 2010s
- 2020s
1 Berks County Courthouse
2 Berks County Services Center
3 Lincoln Tower Apartments
4 Trinity Lutheran Church
5 Christ Episcopal Church
6 Madison Building
7 First Reformed Church
8 Reading Elderly Housing
9 Washington Towers
10 St. Mary's Roman Catholic Church
11 Episcopal House of Reading
12 Santander Bank Building
13 Medical Arts Building
14 George M. Rhodes Apartments
15 Dwight D. Eisenhower Apartments
16 St. Peter the Apostle Roman Catholic Church
17 Commonwealth Bank Center

== Tallest buildings ==
This list ranks buildings in Reading that stand at least 130 ft (40 m) tall. Spires and other architectural details are included in the height of a building, however, antennas are excluded.

Tallest building in Reading upon completion

Rank	Name	Image	Location	Height	Floors	Year	Purpose	Notes	References
1	Berks County Courthouse	Reading_Pennsylvania	40°20′10.98″N 75°55′31.29″W	275 ft (84 m)	22	1932	Government, Office	Tallest building in Reading since 1932. First skyscraper art deco "temple of justice" in the United States.	
2	Berks County Services Center	Berks County Services Center Reading, Pennsylvani skyline (cropped)	40°20′11.73″N 75°55′27.25″W	242 ft (74 m)	16	1992	Government, Office		
3	Lincoln Tower Apartments	HOTEL_ABRAHAM_LINCOLN,_READING,_BERKS_COUNTY,_PA	40°20′13.89″N 75°55′41.26″W	214 ft (65 m)	16	1929	Residential, formerly Hotel	Tallest building in Reading from 1929 to 1932.	
4	Trinity Lutheran Church	Trinity_Lutheran_Reading_PA	40°20′13.65″N 75°55′34.03″W	203 ft (62 m)	2	1791	Religious	Tallest building in Reading from 1833 to 1929. (Note: While the church itself was built in 1791, the steeple which makes up most of the church's height was built in 1833.)	
5	Christ Episcopal Church	Christ Episcopal Church Reading Urban (cropped)	40°20′11.35″N 75°55′41.89″W	185 ft (56 m)	1	1862	Religious	Oldest English-speaking congregation in Reading.	
6	Madison Building	Metro_Edison_Reading	40°20′12.62″N 75°55′44.68″W	184 ft (56 m)	14	1926	Office		
7	First Reformed Church	First Reformed Church Reading Urban (cropped)	40°20′13.63″N 75°55′30.38″W	173 ft (53 m)	2	1800	Religious		
8	Reading Elderly Housing	Reading Elderly Housing Reading, Pennsylvani skyline (cropped)	40°20′14.68″N 75°56′09.35″W	171 ft (52 m)	17	1981	Residential		
9	Washington Towers		40°20′12.37″N 75°55′50.02″W	160 ft (49 m)	15	1966	Residential		
10	St. Mary's Roman Catholic Church		40°19′50.86″N 75°54′52.87″W	157 ft (48 m)	4	1900	Religious		
11	Episcopal House of Reading	Episcopal House of Reading View of Reading area from Pagoda (cropped)	40°20′11.84″N 75°55′14.26″W	152 ft (46 m)	16	1972	Residential		
12	Santander Bank Building	Reading Urban (cropped)	40°20′07.87″N 75°55′30.70″W	146 ft (45 m)	10	1978	Office		
13	Medical Arts Building	Medical Arts Building ReadingPAKodachrome1983 (cropped)	40°20′22.09″N 75°55′41.40″W	144 ft (44 m)	12	1930	Office	Designed by Muhlenberg Greene Architects.	
14=	George M. Rhodes Apartments		40°20′02.05″N 75°55′17.85″W	142 ft (43 m)	15	1971	Residential		
14=	Dwight D. Eisenhower Apartments		40°20′02.05″N 75°55′14.08″W	142 ft (43 m)	15	1971	Residential		
16	St. Peter the Apostle Roman Catholic Church		40°19′47.52″N 75°55′42.13″W	140 ft (43 m)	4	1905	Religious		
17	Commonwealth Bank Center	Commonwealth Bank Center Reading Urban (cropped)	40°20′08.59″N 75°55′41.25″W	131 ft (40 m)	10	1903	Office		

== Timeline of tallest buildings ==
Name	Image	Years as tallest	Height	Floors
Trinity Lutheran Church	Trinity_Lutheran_Reading_PA	1833-1929	203 ft (62 m)	2
Lincoln Tower Apartments	HOTEL_ABRAHAM_LINCOLN,_READING,_BERKS_COUNTY,_PA	1929-1932	214 ft (65 m)	16
Berks County Courthouse	Berks County Courthouse WB	1932-Present	275 ft (84 m)	22

== See also ==
- List of tallest buildings in Pennsylvania
- List of tallest buildings in Harrisburg
- List of tallest buildings in Philadelphia
- List of tallest buildings in Pittsburgh
