= Four Seasons Total Landscaping press conference =

2020 press conference by Rudy Giuliani

- Rudy Giuliani speaking at lectern (left of center)
- Date: November 7, 2020
- Time: 11:30 a.m. (Eastern Standard Time)
- Duration: 37:21
- Venue: Four Seasons Total Landscaping
- Location: Holmesburg, Philadelphia, Pennsylvania, U.S.; 40.0262°N 75.0301°W
- Type: Press conference
- Motive: Discussion of the Trump campaign's legal challenges to the ballot-counting process
- Organized by: Donald Trump 2020 presidential campaign
- Participants: Rudy Giuliani; Corey Lewandowski; Republican poll-watchers (Note: The only people to speak out of the group of poll watchers were: Daryl Brooks, Matt Silver, and Lisette Tarragano.); News media

On November 7, 2020, four days after the United States presidential election was held, Rudy Giuliani – the former mayor of New York City and an attorney for president Donald Trump – hosted a press conference at Four Seasons Total Landscaping, a small business in the Holmesburg neighborhood of Northeast Philadelphia, Pennsylvania. The event was held at the company's garage door and parking lot to discuss the status of the Trump campaign's legal challenges to the ballot-counting process in the state, where the president's apparent lead over Joe Biden in the first ballots counted had shifted to a shortfall as mail-in ballots were counted for Philadelphia, historically a heavily Democratic city.

The site of the press conference, a local landscaping business, was unexpected. Many journalists and others quickly noted a comical aspect to its location, near a sex shop and a crematorium. This site selection led to speculation that the Trump campaign meant to book the upscale Four Seasons Hotel Philadelphia, five city blocks from the Pennsylvania Convention Center, where Philadelphia's ballots were being counted. Shortly after Giuliani began talking to the assembled reporters, Biden was projected as the winner of the Pennsylvania vote and thus the nationwide election. Several news outlets characterized the event as the symbolic end of Trump's first presidency.

The event was ridiculed by journalists and users of social media. It garnered further ridicule after it emerged that one of the witnesses who spoke at the event was a convicted sex offender. It resulted in lawyers withdrawing from the legal team that the Trump campaign had assembled to challenge the election results. In response to the press conference, a Four Seasons–themed fun run was created, and the landscaping company capitalized on the newfound attention by selling T-shirts and other merchandise emblazoned with "Make America Rake Again" — a play on Trump's Make America Great Again slogan.

== Background ==
After Election Day on November 3, 2020, Philadelphia election officials had set up absentee ballot counting efforts in the Pennsylvania Convention Center in Center City, as downtown Philadelphia is known locally. The streets in the area had been filled with demonstrators supporting each candidate.

On November 5, Trump campaign spokespeople Corey Lewandowski and Pam Bondi attempted to talk to the media just outside the convention center about a court ruling that allowed campaign observers to stand closer to the counting tables. Pro-Biden demonstrators nearby played Beyoncé's "Party" so loudly that Bondi could not be heard. Lewandowski decided the Trump campaign needed to find a venue where such disruption was less likely, in a part of the city where voters had been more supportive of Trump's candidacy.

Early on November 7, Trump tweeted the location of the press conference as "Four Seasons". Shortly afterwards he issued another tweet, clarifying that the venue was Four Seasons Total Landscaping. (Note: Timeline of notable moments (all times are EST and begin in the morning of November 7, 2020): 8:45 – Sean Middleton, director of sales at Four Seasons Total Landscaping, gets a call from a Trump staffer surveying areas along the I-95 corridor, asking if the company would be willing to host a news conference.; 9:30 – Four Seasons Total Landscaping staff meet with the Trump team to assess the venue.; 9:35 – Donald Trump posts a tweet, but then deletes it 5 minutes later at 9:41: "Lawyers Press Conference at Four Seasons, Philadelphia. 11:00 A.M."; 9:40 – At the venue, the Trump team confirms that Four Seasons Total Landscaping is "the perfect location" for the conference.; 9:43 – Trump replies to the previous tweet with a clarification, but then deletes 1 minute later at 9:45: "Four Season's Landscaping!"; 9:45 – Trump tweets: "Big press conference today in Philadelphia at Four Seasons Total Landscaping — 11:30am!"; 10:00 – Trump tweets, but then deletes 6 minutes later at 10:06: "Lawyer's Press Conference at Four Season's Landscaping, Philadelphia. Enjoy!"; 10:45 – Four Seasons Hotel Philadelphia tweet a clarification: "To clarify, President Trump's press conference will NOT be held at Four Seasons Hotel Philadelphia. It will be held at Four Seasons Total Landscaping— no relation with the hotel."; 10:55 – Rudy Giuliani arrives on site and sets up a war room in the front office.; 11:30 – The scheduled start time, as set by the only tweet regarding the event that was not deleted.; 11:50 – The press conference begins.; 12:19 – Giuliani is informed that the election has been called by "all the networks".; 12:27 – The press conference ends.) One of the president's tweets that identifies the landscaping business as the site for the press conference reads: " 'Four Season's Landscaping! Big press conference today in Philadelphia at Four Seasons Total Landscaping – 11:30am!'" According to The New York Times, Trump's team had intended to hold the press conference at the landscaper business but the president thought they meant the upscale Four Seasons Hotel Philadelphia in Center City. "In reality, the mistake was not in the booking, but in a garbled game of telephone," The New York Times wrote. At 10:45 a.m., the hotel verified that the event was at the landscapers.

PBS reporter Daniel Bush said an unnamed company representative told him the Trump campaign had called the landscapers and said their location "was close to an exit on I-95, and was secure, and that's why they wanted to use it." The local Republican ward leader told The Philadelphia Inquirer that he was not notified in advance and that neither Four Seasons' owner Marie Siravo nor anyone in her family were particularly involved in local politics. She had expressed support for Trump on a Facebook page in August, but was not exceptionally vocal, saying "we don't need to invite him for dinner."

It was later revealed that an hour before the event was first announced, a Trump staffer had called the former director of sales at Four Seasons Total Landscaping, Sean Middleton, to ask if the company would be willing to host a news conference. After getting permission from the owner Marie, Middleton drove to the venue to meet with Michael Siravo, director of operations and Marie Siravo's son. The meeting lasted around 10 minutes, at which point the venue was decided on.

== Event ==
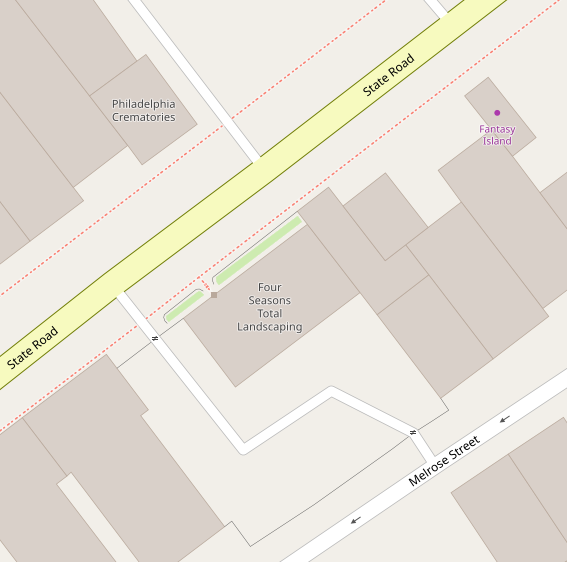
Businesses on State Road, Philadelphia

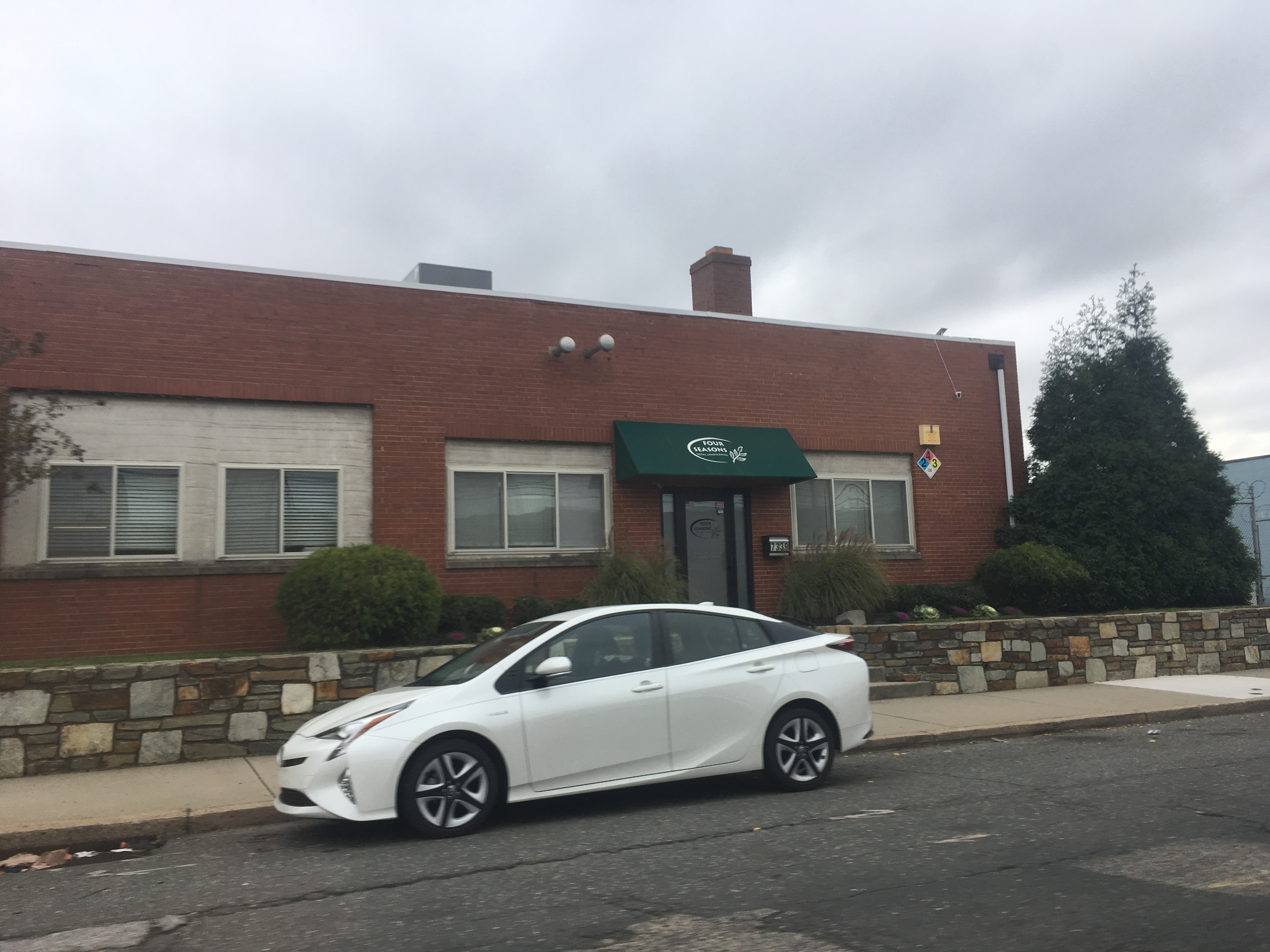
Four Seasons Total Landscaping facade

Journalists who arrived took note of the surrounding neighborhood. "It was in that part of town that every town has, where businesses which have no right being grouped together nonetheless gather due to one reason or another—usually the cheap rent" observed the British newspaper The Independent. Four Seasons is on the same block as a sex shop, across the street from a crematorium, and down the road from the Philadelphia Department of Prisons. Giuliani did not offer any explanation as to why the news conference was being held at that location.

In Four Seasons' parking lot, with help from Corey Lewandowski and Pam Bondi, a lectern had been set up in front of a garage door papered over with Trump campaign signs in red and blue. Speakers and a microphone had been installed. Giuliani and Lewandowski came in with a group of people the former identified as poll watchers who they said had been prevented from properly observing the counting procedure. In reference to the poll watchers, Giuliani stated "this is only two or three of about 50 people so far that have given us statements, affidavits, recordings. We're going to have many, many witnesses." Also in attendance was a personal friend of Giuliani's, Bernard Kerik, who had recently received a full presidential pardon for offenses including tax fraud and lying to White House officials.

Before the press conference began, a journalist present announced that CNN had just projected Biden's victory. During the event, while Giuliani was stating how strong their case was, a reporter interrupted to say that all of the major news networks were now joining in projecting Biden's victory. Giuliani asked "Who was it called by?" Sky News correspondent Mark Stone replied by saying "All the networks." Giuliani then responded by looking heavenward and striking a pose of mock crucifixion, saying:

All the, oh my goodness, all the networks. Wow! All the networks! We have to forget about the law. Judges don't count. All the networks, all the networks. All the networks thought Biden was going to win by 10%. Gee, what happened? Come on, don't be, don't be ridiculous. Networks don't get to decide elections, courts do.

Giuliani also said, in reference to Trump, that "Obviously he's not going to concede when at least 600,000 ballots are in question." As he spoke, some reporters began packing their equipment and leaving, before he had finished and the poll watchers had spoken.

=== Allegations ===
Giuliani said that Philadelphia "has a sad history of voter fraud" including ballots submitted by dead people, specifically mentioning boxer Joe Frazier and actor Will Smith's father. The claims, which potentially originated from a pro-Trump blog the day before the event, were quickly dismissed by Philadelphia city officials. After looking into the cases of Frazier and Smith as well as a list of others, Republican City Commissioner Al Schmidt told White House correspondent Kaitlan Collins that "Not a single one voted in Philadelphia after they died." The first speaker Giuliani called up to speak about the alleged election fraud was Daryl Brooks, a registered sex offender.

Without mentioning a specific amount, Giuliani also stated that "[t]here certainly is enough evidence to disqualify a certain number of ballots."

Lewandowski cited one case of what he said was a documented deceased Pennsylvania voter, Denise Ondick, of Homestead in Allegheny County, near Pittsburgh. According to her online obituary, she died on October 22. Voting records show a mail-in ballot was sent to her two days later; on November 2, the ballot was recorded by the Pennsylvania Department of State's tracking system. The Inquirer said it was unclear whether that meant it had actually been counted.

Ondick's family confirmed that she had received an absentee ballot application; her daughter said she had helped her mother, who planned to vote for Trump, fill it out two days prior to her death and the state records show the application was received the day after Ondick died. But she had not mailed the ballot in after her mother died, and she said her father could not recall doing so.

Lewandowski said that his cited evidence was not empirical or anecdotal, and that it was hard evidence, (Note: Corey Lewandowski had previously stated under oath before a House Judiciary Committee, that he has "no obligation" to tell the truth to the media.) one of many exhibits that would be filed with the court. Election officials in Allegheny County said they would investigate. An official complaint was never filed; the county referred the matter to its police department.

== Aftermath ==
One journalist likened the event to an appearance by Libyan dictator Muammar Gaddafi driving a golf cart and carrying a large umbrella as NATO forces began bombing the country to support the 2011 rebellion. "It was intended to project perseverance and strength—it had the opposite effect." Adam Gabbatt of The Guardian reported that the landscaping company's name "swiftly became a byword for politicians' incompetence".

The event was also criticized for including Daryl Brooks, a New Jersey–based perennial candidate and convicted sex offender; Giuliani later told the New York Daily News that he was unaware of the man's history.

On November 12, CNN reported that Corey Lewandowski, one of the speakers at the press conference, had tested positive for COVID-19. While Lewandowski was present at the Trump election night party, possibly making him a part of the White House COVID-19 outbreak responsible for at least three other diagnoses, he said he may have caught it while in Philadelphia, without specifying Four Seasons Total Landscaping as the site of his infection.

On November 14, Politico and The Independent reported that many of the lawyers the Trump campaign had spent months recruiting prior to the election decided to withdraw as a result of the press conference, undercutting the Trump campaign's legal strategy for challenging the election results that they had meticulously planned for months.

According to a review of Trump campaign financial disclosure reports by NBCLX, there was no payment made to Four Seasons for facility rental based on expenses for October 15 through November 23 reported by the campaign or related political action committees (PACs), Trump Victory and Save America.

Olivia Nuzzi, of New York magazine, published an extensive report about the event that involved "more than 37 sources spread throughout the White House, the Trump campaign, the president's network of advisers both formal and informal, the Republican Party, and the Commonwealth of Pennsylvania."

After FBI agents raided Giuliani's apartment and office on April 28, 2021, Four Seasons posted a meme on Twitter with the caption "Wrong apartment. We kicked him out months ago."

=== Public reaction ===
CNN reported that the event was "widely ridiculed". It drew humor and parody on social media, where it was assumed the Trump campaign had simply made a mistake with the booking, and it was compared to similar mishaps in the political satire series Veep and The Thick of It. "Four Seasons Total Landscaping" became the 21st most-popular trending topic on Twitter; the following day it was at number one. Yelp users posted reviews, activating an "Unusual Activity" alert, which temporarily disabled the posting of content to the page pending investigation to determine the legitimacy of the views. Visitors came to the building to take pictures of themselves with the company's gates and logo in the background.

The area was recreated in VRChat by YouTuber Coopertom, while others created mock Lego sets.

Two Philadelphia runners, Chip Chantry and Jeff Lyons of the Junk Miles with Chip & Jeff podcast, announced the charity "Fraud Street Run" (a pun on the city's annual Broad Street Run) for November 29, covering the 11 miles (18 km) from the landscaping business to the hotel. Later, the organizers decided to make it a virtual run, as they did not believe it was possible to maintain social distancing during the event. The 2,100 participants from around the world were to run anywhere they chose that day, including the planned course, and upload a picture of themselves running to social media. The event proved to be more popular than anticipated, eventually raising nearly US$63,000 for the food bank Philabundance. The race was held for a second time on November 6, 2021, with a route from the Four Seasons Hotel to Four Seasons Total Landscaping. The "Fraud Street Bike Ride" was organized by the Bicycle Coalition of Greater Philadelphia to provide additional donations and included a bike-friendly route using bike lanes and multi-use paths along the Delaware River.

A Change.org petition that called for the location to be added to the National Register of Historic Places was launched, and it was jokingly suggested that if Trump were to create a presidential library then it should be built at Four Seasons Total Landscaping.

=== Reaction by Four Seasons Total Landscaping ===
Following the press conference, Four Seasons Total Landscaping posted on Instagram thanking police for their participation. "Would like to thank the fabulous Philadelphia men and women in blue making this event a safe place," they wrote. The company's Instagram bio describes the firm as a "woman-owned, minority business ... that does great landscaping & perfect snow removal" and is "trying to make America green again!" Four Seasons Total Landscaping also clarified that it was not attempting to make a political statement by hosting the Trump campaign. On November 8, Four Seasons announced it would begin selling T-shirts and other merchandise through its website the next day. Some of the items for sale featured wording based on Trump slogans, such as Make America Rake Again and Lawn and Order! In three weeks, Four Seasons had sold 30,000 shirts. Merchandise sales, including T-shirts, Christmas sweaters, and face masks, totaled to approximately US$1.3 million. The company also created a virtual background for use in the video conferencing software Zoom.

Speaking at the start line of the Fraud Street Run, director of sales, Sean Middleton, said "We're from Northeast Philly, we can laugh at ourselves," and "For us to come out and make a political statement as Four Seasons Total Landscaping in Northeast Philly was never our intent." In an interview with Business Insider a month after the event, Middleton said they were still receiving calls from major media outlets worldwide.

Four Seasons Total Landscaping planned to host a surf and turf gala on May 8, 2021, in order to benefit four ALS-related charities that were unable to do any fundraising activities in 2020 due to the COVID-19 pandemic, but the event was rescheduled to September 25, 2021, and subsequently cancelled. The idea for the event came from Larry Kaplan, a West Chester–based volunteer who in 2016 raised nearly US$100,000 by doing the Ice Bucket Challenge.

On July 30, 2021, Four Seasons Total Landscaping announced "Lawn Jawn", a craft beer with a label depicting the press conference.

== In popular culture ==
The event received broad coverage on American late-night talk shows with mentions on The Late Show with Stephen Colbert, Late Night with Seth Meyers, The Late Late Show with James Corden, Full Frontal with Samantha Bee, The Tonight Show Starring Jimmy Fallon, Jimmy Kimmel Live!, and The Daily Show. Saturday Night Live's Kate McKinnon mentioned Four Seasons in an appearance as Giuliani on the show's "Weekend Update" news segment, and made another indirect reference to it a month later during the show's cold open. Conan, on TBS, presented the video "Other Historic Moments That Took Place at Four Seasons Total Landscaping" jokingly acknowledging "Trump isn't the only public figure who likes to make historic announcements at this small landscaping company in Philadelphia."

American comedian Tim Heidecker wrote a song about the event, and British comedy writer Michael Spicer created a spoof advert.

Artist Tracey Snelling created a multimedia diorama model of the site and neighboring businesses, which includes video from the event as well as clips of Giuliani's controversial appearance in the mockumentary Borat Subsequent Moviefilm.

A Fiverr commercial featuring Four Seasons' owner Marie Siravo aired during Super Bowl LV.

On August 21, 2021, punk rock musician Laura Jane Grace played a concert at the venue to a sold-out crowd of 200 people. The concert was potentially going to be cancelled due to zoning and permitting issues, but they were resolved.

A documentary about the press conference, entitled Four Seasons Total Documentary, was aired on MSNBC on November 7, 2021.

When Giuliani appeared on the seventh season of The Masked Singer in 2022, one of the clues for the judges about his identity was a list of the four seasons, a reference to the press conference's location.

== See also ==
- Howard Dean's scream, after the 2004 Democratic Iowa caucus
- Richard Nixon's November 1962 press conference, after the 1962 California gubernatorial election
