= List of presidential trips made by George W. Bush (2002) =

This is a list of presidential trips made by George W. Bush during 2002, the second year of his presidency as the 43rd president of the United States. International trips are highlighted in blue.

This list excludes trips made within Washington, D.C., the U.S. federal capital in which the White House, the official residence and principal workplace of the president, is located. It also excludes the capital's immediate surroundings in Maryland and Virginia, such as Andrews Air Force Base in Maryland, where the president typically boards Air Force One for all trips outside the area. Also excluded are trips to Camp David, the country residence of the president, and to the Bush family's Prairie Chapel Ranch near Crawford and Walker's Point Estate in Kennebunkport, Maine.

== January ==
State or country	Areas visited	Dates	Details
Texas	Austin	January 4	Attended the unveiling of his gubernatorial portrait at the Texas State Capitol.
California	Ontario	January 5	Took questions at the Ontario Convention Center.
Oregon	Portland	January 5	Spoke at Parkrose High School.
Ohio	Hamilton	January 8	Signed the No Child Left Behind Act in a ceremony at Hamilton High School.
New Hampshire	Durham	January 8	Spoke in the Lundholm Gym at the University of New Hampshire.
Massachusetts	Boston	January 8	Visited the Boston Latin School.
Pennsylvania	Conshohocken	January 11	Signed the Small Business Liability Relief and Brownfields Revitalization Act at the Millennium Corporate Center.
Illinois	East Moline	January 14	Spoke at a John Deere factory.
Missouri	Springfield, Aurora	January 14	Spoke at Springfield–Branson National Airport and an MFA Incorporated feed mill.
Louisiana	New Orleans	January 14–15	Spoke at the Nashville Avenue Wharf in the Port of New Orleans.
West Virginia	Charleston, Belle	January 22	Spoke at Yeager Airport. Toured a local business in Belle, the Cecil I. Walker Machinery Company.
Maine	Portland	January 25	Visited Southern Maine Technical College.
North Carolina	Winston-Salem	January 30	Discussed Homeland Security at Winston-Salem State University.
Florida	Daytona Beach	January 30	Met with local Senior Corps volunteers.
Georgia	Atlanta	January 31	Spoke at Atlanta Marriott Marquis. Toured Booker T. Washington High School.

== February ==
State or country	Areas visited	Dates	Details
West Virginia	White Sulphur Springs	February 1	Spoke to the Congress of Tomorrow luncheon at The Greenbrier.
Florida	Fort Walton Beach	February 4	Visited troops at Eglin Air Force Base.
Pennsylvania	Pittsburgh	February 5	Spoke at the University of Pittsburgh and the local Masonic Temple.
New York	New York	February 6	Attended a reception for Governor George Pataki at the Sheraton New York Times Square Hotel. Met with Cardinal Edward Egan. Attended a fundraiser at the private residence of Mayor Michael Bloomberg.
Colorado	Denver	February 8	Addressed the National Cattlemen's Beef Association convention at the Colorado Convention Center.
Utah	Salt Lake City	February 8	Met with LDS Church president Gordon B. Hinckley at the Church Administration Building. Visited the Utah State Capitol. Declared the Games open during the 2002 Winter Olympics opening ceremony at Rice-Eccles Olympic Stadium.
Wyoming	Jackson Hole	February 8	
Wisconsin	Milwaukee	February 11	Visited the Medical College of Wisconsin. Campaigned for Governor Scott McCallum's re-election at the Pfister Hotel.
Alaska	Anchorage	February 16–17	Stopover on the way to Japan. Visited troops at Elmendorf Air Force Base. Met with members of the Alaska Federation of Natives and addressed the Republican Party of Alaska at the Alaska Native Heritage Center.
Japan	Tokyo	February 16–19	Met with Emperor Akihito and Prime Minister Junichiro Koizumi. Addressed the Diet.
South Korea	Seoul, Dorasan, Osan	February 19–21	Met with President Kim Dae-jung. Visited the Korean Demilitarized Zone. Addressed U.S. military personnel.
China	Beijing	February 21–22	Met with President Jiang Zemin and Premier Zhu Rongji.
North Carolina	Charlotte	February 27	Took questions on welfare reform at the local Chamber of Commerce. Campaigned for Elizabeth Dole for Senate and Robin Hayes for Congress at the Charlotte Convention Center.

== March ==
State or country	Areas visited	Dates	Details
Iowa	Des Moines	March 1	Took questions on 401(k) retirement savings policy at a local business, The Printer, Inc. Campaigned for Tom Latham for Congress at the Des Moines Marriott Hotel.
Minnesota	Eden Prairie, Minneapolis	March 4	Toured Eden Prairie High School. Campaigned for Norm Coleman for Senate at the Minneapolis Hilton and Towers.
Florida	St. Petersburg	March 8	Discussed corporate management reform at a local business, America II Electronics. Attended a Republican Party of Florida reception at The Don CeSar.
Pennsylvania	Philadelphia	March 12	Visited a local nonprofit agency, the People's Emergency Center.
North Carolina	Fayetteville, Fort Bragg	March 15	Addressed troops at the Crown Complex.
Illinois	Chicago	March 16	Participated in a Chicago St. Patrick's Day parade.
Missouri	St. Louis, O'Fallon	March 18	Discussed small business policy at a local O'Fallon business, Albers Manufacturing Company. Campaigned for Jim Talent for Senate at America's Center.
Texas	El Paso	March 21	Toured the commercial cargo dock at the Bridge of the Americas before crossing into Mexico.
Mexico	Monterrey	March 21–22	Attended the International Conference on Financing for Development. Met with President Vicente Fox.
Peru	Lima	March 23–24	Met with the presidents Alejandro Toledo of Peru, Andrés Pastrana Arango of Colombia, and Jorge Quiroga of Bolivia, and with the vice president Pedro Pinto Rubianes of Ecuador.
El Salvador	San Salvador	March 24	Attended the Summit Meeting of Presidents of the Central American Republics.
South Carolina	Greenville	March 27	Met with first responders at a local fire station. Spoke at the Peace Center. Campiagned for Lindsey Graham for Senate at the Palmetto Expo Center.
Georgia	Atlanta	March 27	Met with first responders at Georgia Tech. Campaigned for Saxby Chambliss for Senate at the Grand Hyatt Atlanta in Buckhead.
Texas	Dallas	March 28	Campaigned for John Cornyn for Senate at the Hyatt Regency Dallas.

== April ==
State or country	Areas visited	Dates	Details
Pennsylvania	Media, Philadelphia	April 2	Discussed early childhood education at Penn State Delaware County. Campaigned for D. Michael Fisher in the gubernatorial election at the Four Seasons Hotel Philadelphia.
Tennessee	Knoxville	April 8	Toured the Citizens Police Academy. Discussed the Citizen Corps program at the Knoxville Civic Coliseum.
Connecticut	Bridgeport, Greenwich	April 9	Toured the South End Community Center. Discussed the USA Freedom Corps program at Klein Memorial Auditorium. Attended a Republican Party luncheon at the Hyatt Regency Greenwich.
Iowa	Cedar Rapids	April 15	Discussed tax policy at a General Mills plant. Campaigned for Greg Ganske for Senate at the U.S. Cellular Center.
Virginia	Lexington	April 17	Visited the Virginia Military Institute to bestow the George C. Marshall ROTC Award.
New York	Wilmington	April 22	Volunteered in a maintenance project on the Ausable River Trail in Adirondack Park to celebrate Earth Day. Visited the Whiteface Mountain Ski Lodge.
South Dakota	Wentworth, Sioux Falls	April 24	Toured a local Wentworth business, the Dakota Ethanol Plant. Campaigned for John Thune for Senate at the Sioux Falls Convention Center. Attended a South Dakota Republican Party rally at the Sioux Falls Arena.
Texas	Houston	April 27	Attended the wedding of a former presidential aide, Logan Walters, at St. Martin's Episcopal Church.
New Mexico	Albuquerque	April 29	Spoke at the University of New Mexico Continuing Education Center. Campaigned for Heather Wilson for Congress at the Crowne Plaza Pyramid Hotel.
California	Los Angeles, San Jose, Santa Clara	April 29–30	Visited the First African Methodist Episcopal Renaissance Center in South Central Los Angeles. Campaigned for Bill Simon in the gubernatorial election at the Westin Century Plaza Hotel and at the Santa Clara Convention Center. Spoke about "compassionate conservatism" at Parkside Hall.

== May ==
State or country	Areas visited	Dates	Details
Michigan	Southfield	May 6	Toured Vandenberg Elementary School.
Wisconsin	Milwaukee, La Crosse	May 8	Visited Rufus King International Baccalaureate High School and Clarke Street Elementary School in Milwaukee and Logan High School in La Crosse.
Ohio	Columbus	May 10	Spoke at St. Stephen's Community House. Campaigned for Bob Taft in the gubernatorial election at the Hyatt Regency Columbus.
Illinois	Chicago	May 13	Discussed the welfare-to-work program at a UPS loading dock on Jefferson Street. Campaigned for Jim Ryan in the gubernatorial election at the Sheraton Chicago Hotel and Towers.
Florida	Miami	May 20	Marked the 100th anniversary of the Republic of Cuba gaining independence from the United States with Cuban Americans at the Knight Center Complex.
Germany	Berlin	May 22–23	Met with Chancellor Gerhard Schröder. Addressed the Bundestag.
Russia	Moscow, St. Petersburg	May 23–26	Summit meeting with President Vladimir Putin. Signed Strategic Offensive Reductions Treaty.
France	Paris, Sainte-Mère-Église, Colleville	May 26–27	Met with President Jacques Chirac. Delivered a Memorial Day address in Normandy.
Italy	Rome	May 27–28	Met with President Carlo Azeglio Ciampi and Prime Minister Silvio Berlusconi. Attended the NATO Summit Meeting and inaugurated the NATO-Russia Council.
Vatican City	Apostolic Palace	May 28	Audience with Pope John Paul II.

== June ==
State or country	Areas visited	Dates	Details
New York	West Point	June 1	Gave the commencement address at the United States Military Academy.
Arkansas	Little Rock	June 3	Spoke at the Statehouse Convention Center. Took questions on welfare reform policy at The Church at Rock Creek.
Iowa	Des Moines	June 7	Attended the World Pork Expo at the Iowa State Fairgrounds.
Missouri	Kansas City	June 11	Toured a water treatment facility and Oak Park High School. Campaigned for Jim Talent for Senate at the Marriott Kansas City Downtown.
Ohio	Columbus	June 14	Gave the commencement address at Ohio State University in Ohio Stadium.
Texas	Houston	June 14	Visited the headquarters of the Association for the Advancement of Mexican Americans. Campaigned for Rick Perry in the gubernatorial election at the Hyatt Regency Houston Downtown.
Georgia	Atlanta	June 17	Spoke at St. Paul AME Church.
Florida	Orlando	June 21	Attended the Republican Party of Florida Majority Dinner at the Universal Studios Florida Loews Portofino Bay Hotel.
New Jersey	Newark	June 24	Met with first responders to the September 11 attacks at Port Newark–Elizabeth Marine Terminal. Campaigned for Mike Ferguson for Congress at the Sheraton Newark Airport Hotel.
Arizona	Springerville, Eagar	June 25	Met with people displaced by the Rodeo–Chediski Fire at Round Valley High School.
Canada	Kananaskis	June 25–27	Attended the 28th G8 summit.

== July ==
State or country	Areas visited	Dates	Details
Ohio	Cleveland	July 1	Spoke about "inner-city compassion" at Playhouse Square Center.
Wisconsin	Milwaukee	July 2	Spoke about faith-based welfare initiatives at the Holy Redeemer Institutional Church of God in Christ.
West Virginia	Ripley	July 4	Celebrated Independence Day at a "Saluting Our Veterans" in Courthouse Square.
New York	New York	July 9	Spoke about corporate responsibility at the Regent Wall Street Hotel.
Minnesota	Minneapolis	July 11	Discussed prescription drug policy at the Hyatt Regency Minneapolis. Campaigned for Norm Coleman for Senate and John Kline for Congress at Target Center.
Maryland	Thurmont	July 12	Visited Camp Greentop.
Alabama	Birmingham	July 15	Spoke at the Alys Robinson Stephens Performing Arts Center at the University of Alabama at Birmingham. Campaigned for Bob Riley in the gubernatorial election at the Birmingham–Jefferson Convention Complex.
Michigan	Rochester, Troy	July 18	Traveled with Polish president Aleksander Kwaśniewski. The two presidents addressed Polish Americans at the Oakland University Athletics Center and attended a luncheon at the American-Polish Cultural Center.
New York	Fort Drum	July 19	Welcomed the 10th Mountain Division, the first U.S. conventional forces to fight in Operation Enduring Freedom, as they returned home.
Illinois	Argonne	July 22	Spoke at Argonne National Laboratory.
North Carolina	High Point, Greensboro	July 25	Discussed medical liability reform at High Point Regional Hospital. Spoke at the Millis Athletic Convocation Center at High Point University. Campaigned for Elizabeth Dole for Senate at Grandover Resort and Conference Center.
South Carolina	Charleston	July 29	Spoke at West Ashley High School. Campaigned for Mark Sanford in the gubernatorial election at North Charleston Coliseum.

== August ==
State or country	Areas visited	Dates	Details
Maine	Scarborough	August 3	Campaigned for Susan Collins at the Black Point Inn on Prouts Neck.
Pennsylvania	Green Tree, Pittsburgh	August 5	Met with Jumpstart tutoring program volunteers at Pittsburgh International Airport. Met with the nine miners saved in the Quecreek Mine rescue at the Green Tree Volunteer Fire Department station. Campaigned for D. Michael Fisher and signed the Born-Alive Infants Protection Act of 2002 into law in Ballroom 3 at the Hilton Pittsburgh.
Mississippi	Madison, Jackson	August 7	Visited Madison Central High School. Campaigned for Chip Pickering at the Hilton Jackson and Convention Center.
Texas	Waco	August 10	Golfed at the Ridgewood Country Club.
Texas	Waco	August 13	Hosted the President's Economic Forum at Baylor Law School.
Wisconsin	Milwaukee	August 14	Spoke at the Klotsche Center at the University of Wisconsin-Milwaukee. Campaigned for Governor Scott McCallum's re-election at the Bradley Center.
Iowa	Des Moines	August 14	Met the four-year-old McCaughey septuplets and their parents. Visited the Iowa State Fair. Campaigned for Doug Gross in the gubernatorial election at the Iowa Veterans Memorial Auditorium.
South Dakota	Rapid City, Keystone	August 15	Visited Mount Rushmore National Memorial.
Oregon	Ruch, Central Point, Portland	August 22–23	Toured damage from the Squire Peak Fire, then spoke in favor of the Healthy Forests Initiative. Spoke at the Compton Arena. Campaigned for Gordon H. Smith for Senate at the Hilton Portland Hotel.
California	Stockton, Santa Ana, Dana Point, Westwood	August 23–24	Spoke at the Stockton Memorial Civic Auditorium. Campaigned for Bill Simon in the gubernatorial election at the A.G. Spanos Jet Center at Stockton Metropolitan Airport, the St. Regis Monarch Beach Resort in Dana Point, and the Regency Club in Westwood. Addressed the Hispanic community at the Bowers Museum.
New Mexico	Las Cruces	August 24	Spoke at the Pan American Center at New Mexico State University. Campaigned for Steve Pearce for Congress at the Las Cruces Hilton.
Oklahoma	Oklahoma City	August 29	Campaigned for Steve Largent in the gubernatorial election and Jim Inhofe for Senate at the Cox Convention Center.
Arkansas	Little Rock	August 29	Visited Parkview Arts and Science Magnet High School. Campaigned for Tim Hutchinson for Senate at the Statehouse Convention Center.

== September ==
State or country	Areas visited	Dates	Details
Pennsylvania	Neville Township	September 2	Observed Labor Day at a United Brotherhood of Carpenters and Joiners of America training center.
Kentucky	Louisville	September 5	Met the players of Valley Sports American Little League, the 2002 Little League World Series champions. Discussed small business policy at Broadbent Arena. Campaigned for Anne Northup for Congress at The Seelbach Hilton Louisville.
Indiana	South Bend	September 5	Spoke at South Bend Regional Airport. Campaigned for Chris Chocola for Congress at the Century Center.
Michigan	Detroit	September 9	Met Canadian prime minister Jean Chrétien at Cobo Center, discussing progress on the implementation of the Smart Border Declaration. Toured the U.S. Customs and Border Protection facilities at Ambassador Bridge.
Pennsylvania	Shanksville	September 11	Visited the crash site of United Airlines Flight 93 on the first anniversary of the September 11 attacks.
New York	New York	September 11–13	Visited Ellis Island and the World Trade Center site on the first anniversary of the September 11 attacks. Attended the opening of the 57th United Nations General Assembly, including a reception for UN delegates which marked the reopening of the Winter Garden Atrium, which had been heavily damaged in the attacks. Stayed at the Waldorf-Astoria Hotel.
Iowa	Davenport	September 16	Toured a local business, Sears Manufacturing. Campaigned for Jim Nussle for Congress at the Mississippi Valley Fairgrounds.
Tennessee	Nashville	September 17	Campaigned for Lamar Alexander at the Nashville Convention Center. Visited East Literature Magnet School for Pledge Across America.
New Jersey	Trenton	September 23	Spoke at Trenton–Mercer Airport. Campaigned for Douglas Forrester for Senate at the Sovereign Bank Arena.
Texas	Houston	September 26	Campaigned for John Cornyn for Senate at the Hyatt Regency Houston Downtown.
Colorado	Denver	September 27	Campaigned for Bob Beauprez for Congress at the Adam's Mark Hotel.
Arizona	Flagstaff, Phoenix	September 27	Campaigned for Rick Renzi for Congress at the Coconino County Fairgrounds, and for Matt Salmon in the gubernatorial election at Phoenix Civic Plaza.

== October ==
State or country	Areas visited	Dates	Details
Maryland	Baltimore	October 2	Campaigned for Bob Ehrlich in the gubernatorial election at the Hyatt Regency Baltimore.
Massachusetts	Boston	October 4	Campaigned for Mitt Romney in the gubernatorial election at the Seaport Hotel and Seaport World Trade Center.
New Hampshire	Manchester	October 5	Spoke at the local National Guard Armory. Campaigned for John Sununu for Senate at the Expo Center of New Hampshire Holiday Inn.
Ohio	Cincinnati	October 7	Gave a national televised address, laying out the case for war and urging the passage of the Authorization for Use of Military Force Against Iraq, at the Cincinnati Museum Center.
Tennessee	Alcoa, Knoxville	October 8	Spoke at McGhee Tyson Airport. Campaigned for Van Hilleary in the gubernatorial election at the Knoxville Convention Center.
Michigan	Waterford, Dearborn	October 14	Spoke at the Oakland County International Airport. Campaigned for Thaddeus McCotter for Congress at the Ritz-Carlton Dearborn.
Georgia	Atlanta	October 17	Campaigned for Sonny Perdue in the gubernatorial election and Saxby Chambliss for Senate at the Atlanta Marriott Marquis.
Florida	New Smyrna Beach, Daytona Beach	October 17	Visited Read-Pattillo Elementary School in New Smyrna Beach. Attended a Florida Victory 2002 reception at a private residence in Daytona Beach.
Missouri	Springfield	October 18	Spoke at the Hammons Student Center at Southwest Missouri State University.
Minnesota	Rochester	October 18	Spoke at the Rochester Community and Technical College fieldhouse.
Pennsylvania	Downingtown	October 22	Spoke at the United Sports Training Center.
Maine	Bangor	October 22	Spoke at Bangor International Airport.
North Carolina	Charlotte	October 24	Spoke at Charlotte Coliseum.
South Carolina	Columbia	October 24	Spoke at the Jimmy Doolittle Flight Facility Hangar at Columbia Metropolitan Airport.
Alabama	Auburn	October 24	Spoke at Plainsman Park.
Mexico	Los Cabos	October 26–27	Attended the APEC Summit Meeting.
Arizona	Phoenix	October 27–28	Spoke at the Dodge Theater.
New Mexico	Alamogordo	October 28	Spoke at the Riner Steinhoff Soccer Complex.
Colorado	Denver	October 28	Spoke at Wings Over the Rockies Air and Space Museum.
South Dakota	Aberdeen	October 31	Spoke at the Barnett Center at Northern State University.
Indiana	South Bend	October 31	Spoke at South Bend Regional Airport.
West Virginia	Charleston	October 31	Spoke at the Charleston Coliseum & Convention Center.

== November ==
State or country	Areas visited	Dates	Details
Pennsylvania	Harrisburg	November 1	Spoke at Harrisburg International Airport.
New Hampshire	Portsmouth	November 1	Spoke at Pease International Tradeport.
Kentucky	Louisville	November 1	Spoke at the Kentucky International Convention Center.
Tennessee	Blountville	November 2	Spoke at Tri-Cities Regional Airport.
Georgia	Atlanta, Savannah	November 2	Spoke at Cobb Galleria Centre and Savannah International Airport.
Florida	Tampa	November 2–3	Spoke at the Sun Dome at the University of South Florida.
Illinois	Springfield	November 3	Spoke at the Illinois State Police Academy.
Minnesota	St. Paul	November 3	Spoke at the Xcel Energy Center.
South Dakota	Sioux Falls	November 3	Spoke at the Sioux Falls Convention Center.
Iowa	Cedar Rapids	November 3–4	Spoke at the U.S. Cellular Center.
Missouri	St. Charles	November 4	Spoke at the Family Arena.
Arkansas	Bentonville	November 4	Spoke at Northwest Arkansas Regional Airport.
Texas	Dallas	November 4	Spoke at Moody Coliseum at Southern Methodist University.
Czech Republic	Prague	November 19–22	Attended the NATO and EAPC Summit Meetings.
Russia	St. Petersburg	November 22	Met with President Vladimir Putin.
Lithuania	Vilnius	November 22–23	Met with the Presidents of the Baltic states, becoming the first U.S. president to visit the country.
Romania	Bucharest	November 23	Met with President Ion Iliescu.

== December ==
State or country	Areas visited	Dates	Details
Louisiana	Shreveport, New Orleans	December 3	Spoke at Hirsch Memorial Coliseum. Campaigned for Suzanne Haik Terrell in the Senate runoff election at the Fairmont Hotel.
Pennsylvania	Philadelphia	December 12	Met with participants in the Amachi Mentoring Program at Bright Hope Baptist Church. Hosted the White House Conference on Faith-Based and Community Initiatives at the Downtown Marriott Hotel.
