= List of tallest buildings in Pennsylvania =

This list of the tallest buildings in Pennsylvania includes all skyscrapers 400 feet (120 m) or taller, ranked by height. The tallest building in Pennsylvania is the 60-story Comcast Technology Center in Center City Philadelphia, which is 1,121 feet (342 m) in height. The building opened in 2018. It is currently the 14th-tallest building in the United States.

Among Pennsylvania cities, Philadelphia has the most buildings exceeding 400 feet (120 m) in height with 34 followed by Pittsburgh with 16. Excluding buildings in these two cities, the tallest buildings elsewhere in the state are Scranton Times Tower in Scranton, PA at 385 ft (117 m)- although this is a radio tower atop a 5-story structure, 333 Market Street in Harrisburg at 341 ft (104 m), Martin Tower (demolished on May 19, 2019) in Bethlehem at 332 ft (101 m), PPL Building in Allentown at 322 feet (98 m), and the Berks County Courthouse in Reading, PA at 275 ft (84 m). The Comcast Technology Center is not the tallest freestanding structure in Pennsylvania as that would go to the Unit 3 original smokestack in Homer City at 1,217 feet tall.

== Tallest buildings ==
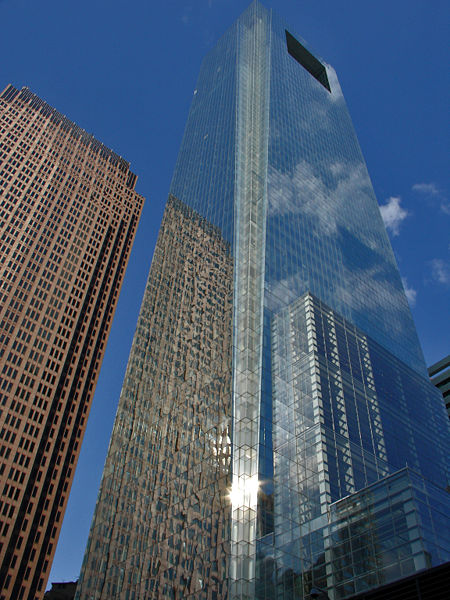
Comcast Center, the second-tallest building in Philadelphia and Pennsylvania

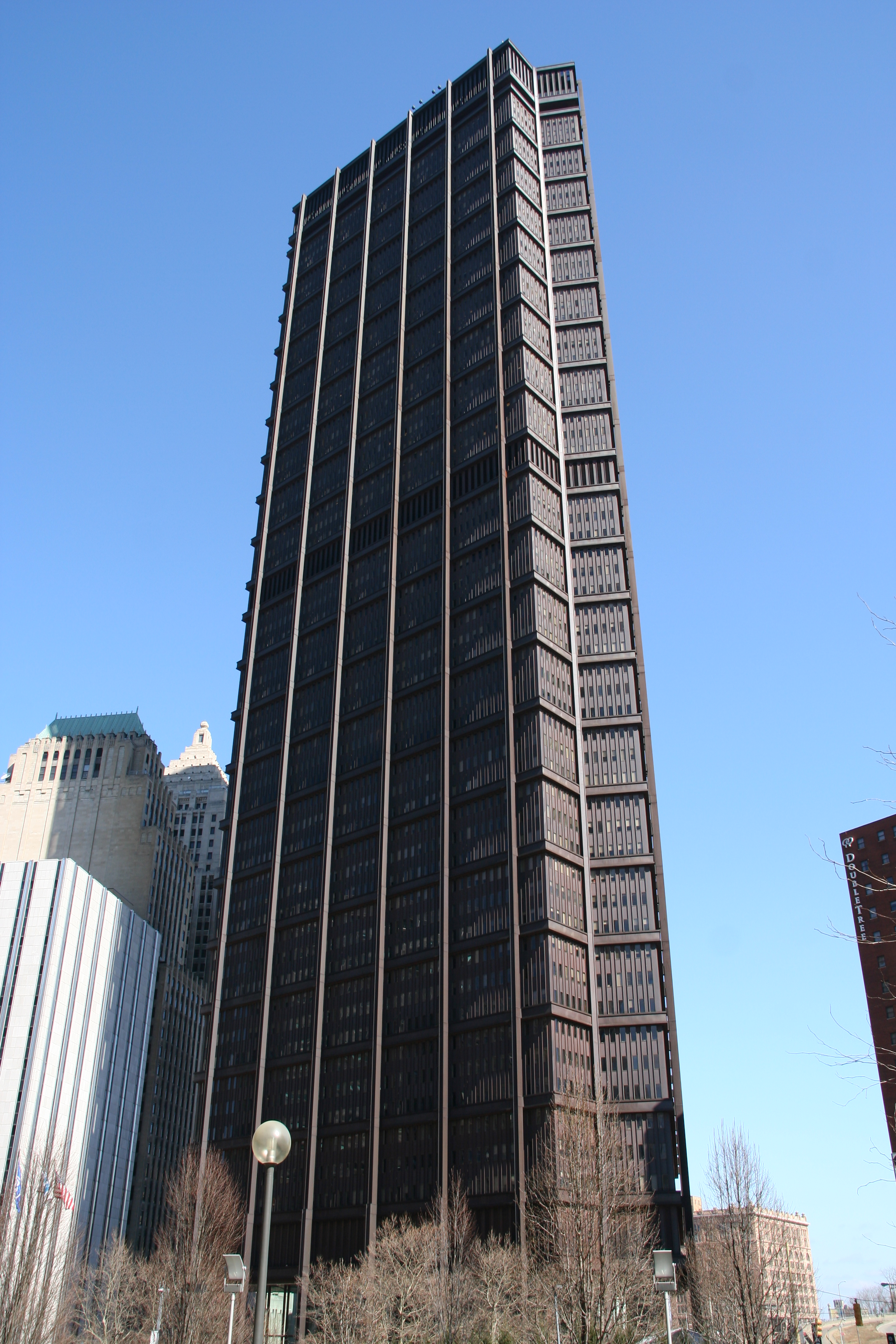
US Steel Tower, the tallest building in Pittsburgh and fifth-tallest building in Pennsylvania

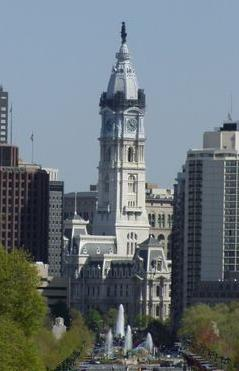
Philadelphia City Hall was the tallest building in the city for 92 years; in 1986, it was surpassed with the opening of One Liberty Place.

Rank	Name	Image	Height ft / (m)	Floors	Year	City	Notes
1	Comcast Technology Center		1,121 / 341	60	2018	Philadelphia	Tallest building in Pennsylvania and Philadelphia; 14th-tallest building in the United States; tallest building completed in Pennsylvania and Philadelphia in the 2010s.
2	Comcast Center		975 / 297	58	2008	Philadelphia	28th-tallest building in the country; tallest building completed in Pennsylvania and Philadelphia in the 2000s
3	One Liberty Place		945 / 288	61	1987	Philadelphia	33rd-tallest building in the country; tallest building completed in Pennsylvania and Philadelphia in the 1980s
4	Two Liberty Place		848 / 258	58	1990	Philadelphia	58th-tallest building in the country; tallest building completed in Pennsylvania and Philadelphia in the 1990s
5	U.S. Steel Tower		841 / 256	64	1971	Pittsburgh	63rd-tallest building in the country; tallest building in Pittsburgh since 1970; tallest building in the state from 1970 until the 1987 completion of One Liberty Place in Philadelphia; tallest building constructed in Pennsylvania and Pittsburgh in the 1970s; formerly known as USX Tower
6	BNY Mellon Center		792 / 241	54	1990	Philadelphia	76th-tallest building in the country; also known as Nine Penn Center
7	Three Logan Square		739 / 225	55	1991	Philadelphia	128th-tallest building in the country; formerly known as Bell Atlantic Tower and Verizon Tower
8	FMC Tower at Cira Centre South		730 / 223	49	2016	Philadelphia	138th-tallest building in the country; the tallest building in Philadelphia outside Center City
9	BNY Mellon Center		725 / 221	54	1984	Pittsburgh	143rd-tallest building in the country; tallest building constructed in Pittsburgh in the 1980s; formerly known as One Mellon Center
10	One PPG Place		635 / 194	40	1984	Pittsburgh	
11	G. Fred DiBona Jr. Building		625 / 191	45	1990	Philadelphia	Formerly known as the Blue Cross–Blue Shield Tower and the IBX Tower
12	The W Philadelphia and Element Philadelphia		617 / 188	51	2020	Philadelphia	tallest building completed in Pennsylvania and Philadelphia in the 2020s.
13	Fifth Avenue Place		616 / 188	31	1988	Pittsburgh	Also known as Highmark Place
14	One Oxford Centre		615 / 187	45	1983	Pittsburgh	
15	The Laurel		604 / 184	50	2022	Philadelphia	Tallest residential building in Philadelphia and Pennsylvania
16	Gulf Tower		582 / 177	44	1932	Pittsburgh	Tallest building constructed in Pennsylvania and Pittsburgh in the 1930s
17=	One Commerce Square		565 / 172	41	1987	Philadelphia	
17=	Two Commerce Square		565 / 172	41	1992	Philadelphia	
19	Philadelphia City Hall		548 / 167	9	1901	Philadelphia	1901 is the official year of completion and the transfer of ownership to the city government; however, the tower had been topped out in 1894 and the building had been partially occupied by then, making it the tallest habitable building in the United States and the world from 1894 until the completion of the Singer Building in 1908; tallest building completed in Pennsylvania and Philadelphia in the 1900s.
20	Tower at PNC Plaza		545 / 166	33	2015	Pittsburgh	Tallest building constructed in Pittsburgh in the 2010s;
21	Cathedral of Learning		535 / 163	42	1936	Pittsburgh	Second-tallest educational building in the world, behind the main building of Moscow State University; tallest building in the city located outside of Downtown
22	Arthaus		528 / 161	47	2022	Philadelphia	
23	525 William Penn Place		520 / 158	41	1951	Pittsburgh	Tallest building constructed in Pennsylvania and Pittsburgh in the 1950s
24	The Residences at The Ritz-Carlton		518 / 158	48	2009	Philadelphia	
25	K&L Gates Center		511 / 156	39	1968	Pittsburgh	Tallest building constructed in Pennsylvania and Pittsburgh in the 1960s
26	1818 Market Street		500 / 152	40	1974	Philadelphia	Tallest building completed in Philadelphia in the 1970s
27	The St. James		498 / 152	45	2004	Philadelphia	Tallest building located east of Broad Street When constructed in 2003, the St. James was the tallest apartment building in Philadelphia.
28	Loews Philadelphia Hotel		492 / 150	36	1932	Philadelphia	Known commonly as the PSFS Building; tallest hotel in the city until the Four Seasons opens in the Comcast Technology Center; tallest building completed in Philadelphia in the 1930s.
29	PNC Bank Building		491 / 150	40	1983	Philadelphia	
30=	Centre Square II		490 / 149	40	1973	Philadelphia	
30=	Five Penn Center		490 / 149	36	1970	Philadelphia	
32	Grant Building		485 / 148	40	1930	Pittsburgh	
33=	Koppers Tower		475 / 145	34	1929	Pittsburgh	Tallest building constructed in Pennsylvania and Pittsburgh in the 1920s
33=	Murano		475 / 145	43	2008	Philadelphia	
35	One South Broad		472 / 144	28	1932	Philadelphia	Formerly known as the PNB Building
36	Two PNC Plaza		445 / 136	34	1975	Pittsburgh	
37=	2000 Market Street		435 / 133	29	1973	Philadelphia	
37=	Two Logan Square		435 / 133	35	1987	Philadelphia	
39	Cira Centre		434 / 133	28	2005	Philadelphia	
40=	1700 Market		430 / 131	32	1968	Philadelphia	Tallest building completed in Philadelphia the 1960s
40=	EQT Plaza		430 / 131	32	1987	Pittsburgh	
40=	Evo at Cira Centre South		430 / 131	33	2014	Philadelphia	
43	1835 Market Street		425 / 130	29	1986	Philadelphia	Name was changed from Eleven Penn Center in 2003
44	One PNC Plaza		424 / 129	30	1972	Pittsburgh	
45	Centre Square I		417 / 127	32	1973	Philadelphia	
46	Jefferson Tower		412 / 126	32	1984	Philadelphia	Formerly known as One Reading Center
47	Regional Enterprise Tower		410 / 125	30	1953	Pittsburgh	
48	Wells Fargo Building		405 / 123	29	1927	Philadelphia	Originally the Fidelity-Philadelphia Trust Company Building; tallest building completed in Philadelphia in the 1920s
49	1706 Rittenhouse		401 / 122	33	2011	Philadelphia	
50	One Logan Square		400 / 122	31	1983	Philadelphia	

== Timeline of tallest buildings ==
Name	Image	Height	Floors	Years tallest	City
Philadelphia City Hall		548 / 167	9	1901–1932 (31 years)	Philadelphia
Gulf Tower		582 / 177	44	1932–1971 (39 years)	Pittsburgh
U.S. Steel Tower		841 / 256	64	1971–1984 (13 years)	Pittsburgh
One Liberty Place		945 / 288	61	1987–2008 (21 years)	Philadelphia
Comcast Center		975 / 297	58	2008–2018 (10 years)	Philadelphia
Comcast Technology Center		1121 / 341	60	2018–present	Philadelphia

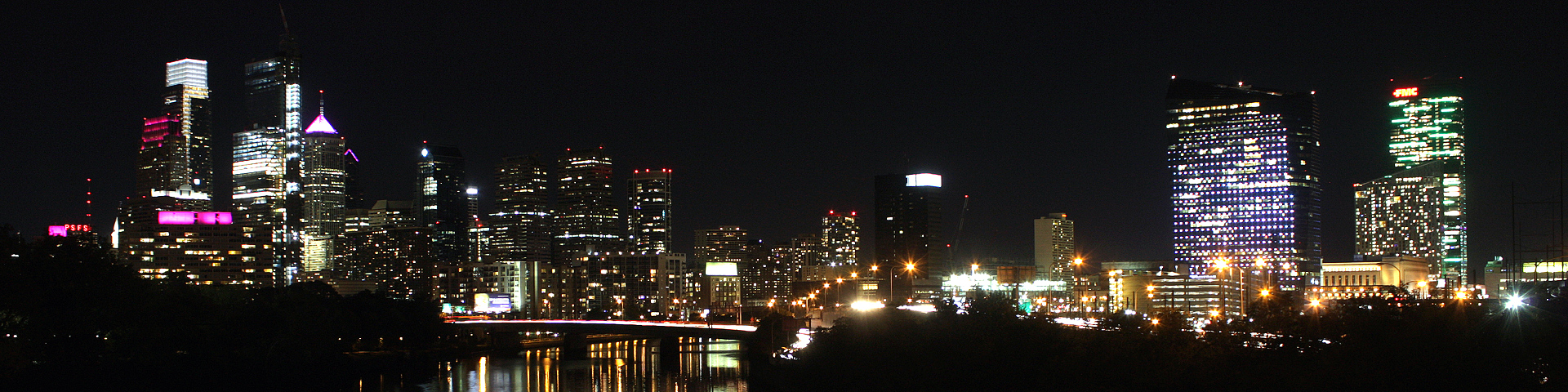
Skyline of Philadelphia viewed from Spring Garden Street Bridge, with Comcast Technology Center to the left with rooftop crane, 2017 (annotated version)
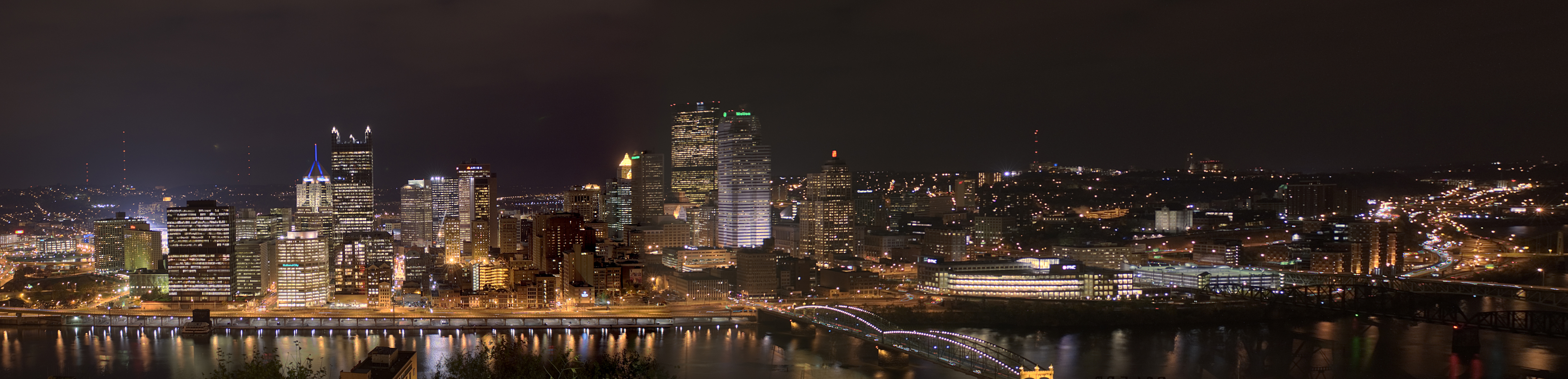
Skyline of Pittsburgh viewed from Mount Washington, 2007

== See also ==
- List of tallest buildings in Harrisburg
- List of tallest buildings in Philadelphia
- List of tallest buildings in Pittsburgh
- List of tallest buildings in Reading, Pennsylvania
