= Tracey Snelling =

American contemporary artist

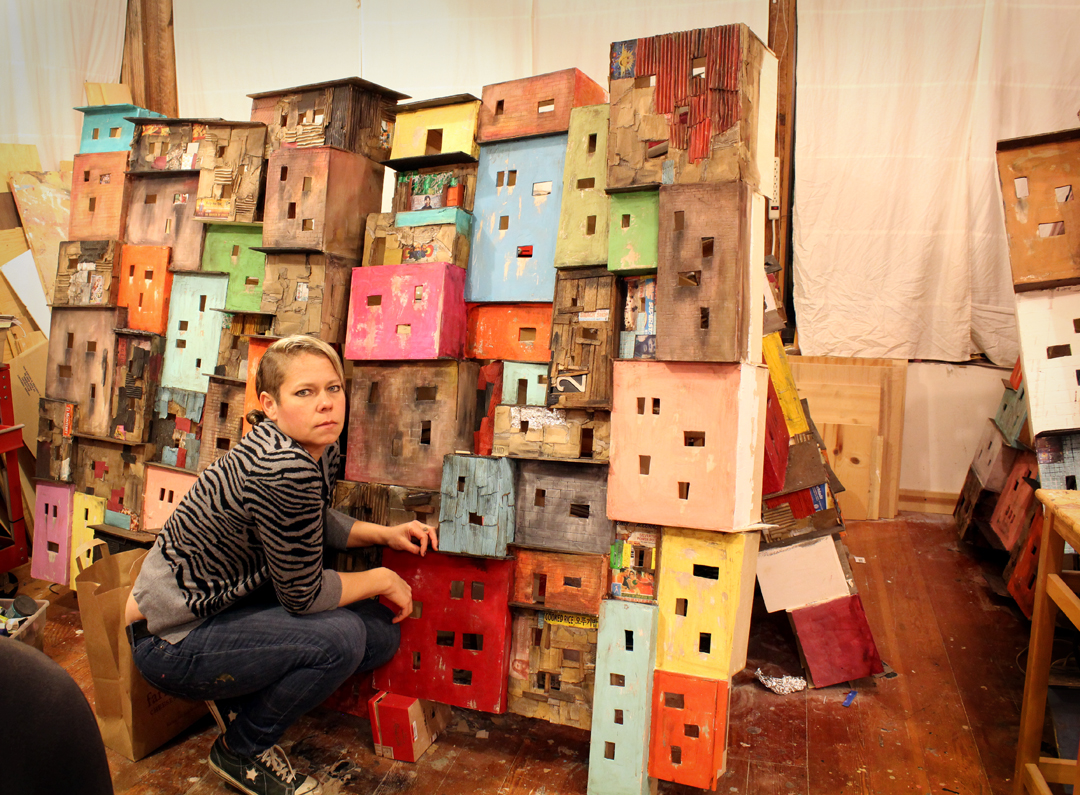
- Born: Tracey Snelling; 1970 (age 55–56); Oakland, California
- Education: University of New Mexico
- Style: Contemporary
- Awards: 2015 Joan Mitchell Foundation Painters and Sculptors Grant

Tracey Snelling (born 1970) is an American contemporary artist. Working with sculpture, video, photography and installation, and deriving from sociology, voyeurism and geographical and architectural location, her work gives her impression of a place, its people, and their experience.

== Early life and education ==
Snelling was born in Oakland, California. She learned about alternative processes and contemporary artists while attending photography classes in Northern California, and began to experiment with photography. She took several years off to do conservation work with the California Conservation Corps and later attended the University of New Mexico, where she earned a BFA, working as a firefighter with the U.S. Forest Service to finance her education.

== Career ==
After her graduation, Snelling worked primarily as a photographer and collage artist. She continued to experiment with photography, painting over images of everyday life and tearing negatives to create surreal images. Her collage photograph 1881 Chestnut Street, an elaborate 2-D representation of a New York brownstone created from snippets of 1940s-era LIFE magazines, inspired her first series of building-type sculptures.

In 2005, she created El Mirador, a small scale sculpture of an adobe hotel with six windows. A DVD player behind the piece showed a montage of film clips, synced so that the characters appeared to be interacting with one another. The original El Mirador was twenty inches tall; Snelling subsequently made a six-and-a-half foot tall version of the piece ("Big El Mirador") to show at a solo exhibition in London and later at Sundance and the Oakland Underground Film Festival. In a review of El Mirador as it was exhibited during Art Basel in 2006, the Miami New Times wrote: "Snelling's voyeuristic work exudes a surreal vibe dripping with poignant haplessness. It plays with the viewer's desire to engage in the emotional mix of the strangers they are intruding upon, as if challenging one not to find seduction in people or things that are broken."

Snelling originally used found footage for her video work. In 2008, she created a large-scale installation, Woman on the Run, commissioned by Selfridges. She had previously used found footage for her video work; for Woman on the Run, she and her friends appeared as characters in the installation, and original footage was shot. Snelling and her co-producer, Idan Levin, collaborated on adding new elements to the installation each time it was shown. Woman on the Run traveled to five different museums in the US, following the debut in London. Snelling worked with Levin again in 2015 on The Stranger, a 4:42 minute film which explored belonging and identity. The film included two narrated poems, one in English and Spanish and the other in Hebrew and Arabic, with concurrent subtitles below.

Snelling's 2013 work included Mystery Hour. It used large-scale posters and elaborate architectural models to create "archetypal worlds from middle- and lowbrow genre films" to "depict imaginary B movies whose premises are as facetious as they are seductively lurid." Artforum described Mystery Hour as "mesmerizing, sinister."

Her multi-media sculptural installation One Thousand Shacks (2016) conveyed the "precarious individual existence" of people living in extreme poverty. Composed of a 16-foot by 10 foot wall of small-scale shacks, photographs, wire, wood, and other materials were used in each shack to capture people "living the best they can in excruciating circumstances," portraying her subjects "not as powerless victims, but rather as defiant and hopeful members of humanity." A variation of One Thousand Shacks titled Tenement Rising was included in Snelling's Naked City solo show in Cologne, Germany in late 2016.

Snelling has exhibited in international galleries, museums and institutions, including the Royal Museums of Fine Arts of Belgium, Palazzo Reale, Milan; Museum of Arts and Design, New York; Kunstmuseem Krefeld, Germany; El Museo de Arte de Banco de la Republica, Bogota; and the Stenersen Museet, Oslo. Her short films have screened at the San Francisco International Film Festival, the Thessaloniki International Film Festival, Circuito Off in Venice, Italy, and the Arquiteturas Film Festival Lisboa in Portugal, among other places. Snelling's Criminal City, a commission for Historisches Museum Frankfurt, opened in September 2017.

Her work is included in the collection of the Museum of Fine Arts Houston.

Snelling lives and works in Oakland, California and Berlin, Germany.
