= Four Seasons Hotel Philadelphia =

Hotel in Philadelphia

Coordinates: 39.9549°N 75.1704°W

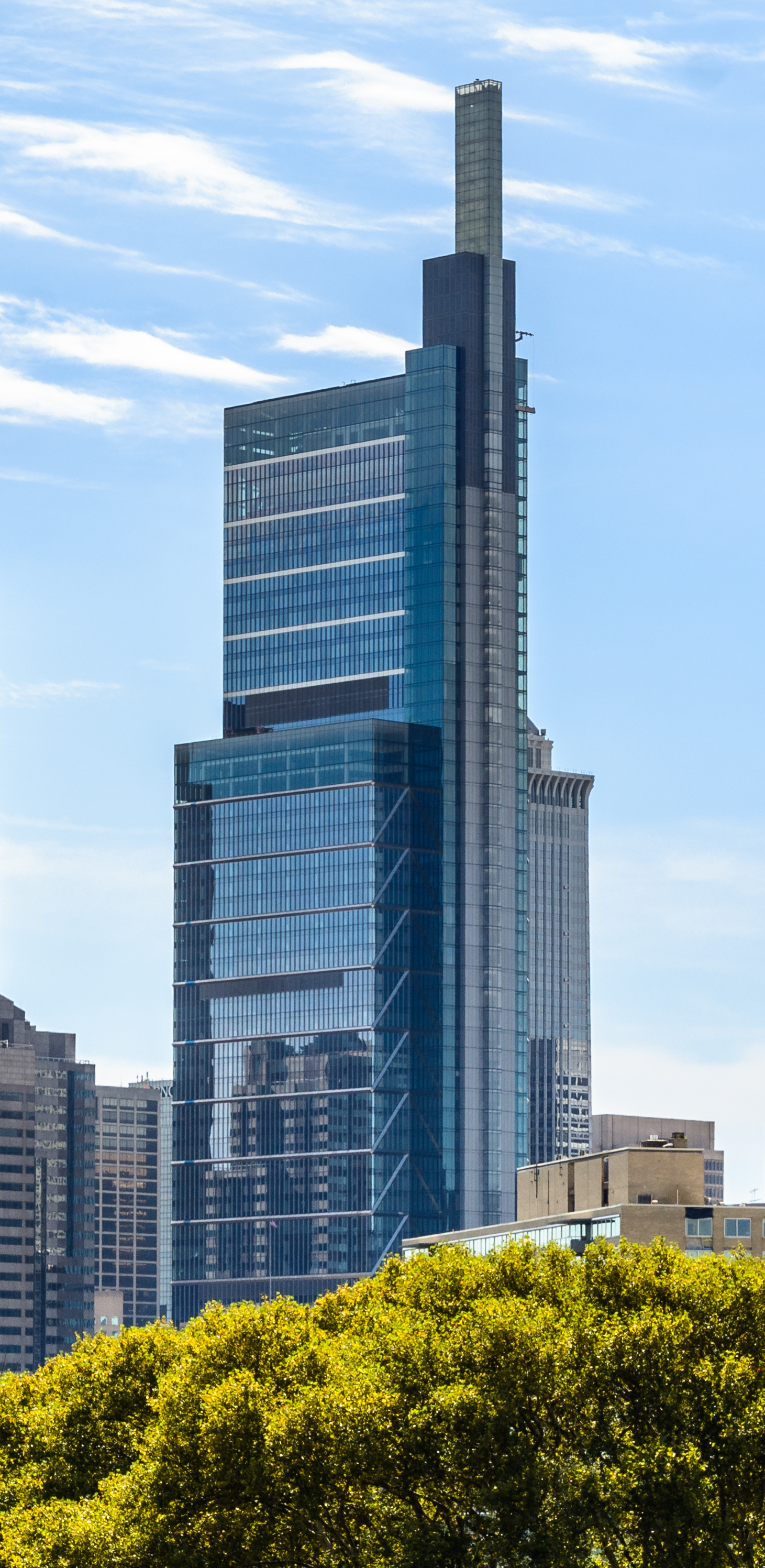
- The Comcast Technology Center hosts the Four Seasons Hotel Philadelphia on the 48th through 56th and 60th floors.

- Location within Pennsylvania

General information
- Type: Hotel, retail, office (mixed-use)
- Location: 1 N. 19th Street, Philadelphia, PA, United States
- Construction started: 2014
- Completed: 2018
- Opening: 2019

Design and construction
- Architects: Foster and Partners; Kendall/Heaton Associates
- Developer: Liberty Property Trust
- Structural engineer: Thornton Tomasetti

The Four Seasons Hotel Philadelphia at Comcast Center is a luxury hotel in Philadelphia that is part of the Four Seasons Hotels and Resorts group.

== History and specifications ==
The hotel is located on the 48th to 56th floors of the Comcast Technology Center with a lobby and restaurant on the 60th floor. Accommodations include 219 rooms, 39 of them suites. The hotel also features an infinity pool and spa.

The building containing the hotel also includes television studios, restaurants, a retail mall, and a parking garage. The entire project contains about 1,566,000 square feet (145,500 m^{2}).

The hotel was formerly on Logan Circle, where it had been for over 30 years. That former location is now the site of The Logan Hotel. The new Four Seasons Hotel opened at the Comcast Technology Center in August 2019.

== In popular culture ==
On November 7, 2020, the Four Seasons Hotel Philadelphia may have been confused by the Donald Trump 2020 presidential campaign for Four Seasons Total Landscaping, a landscaping business on the outskirts of the city that hosted a press conference for the Trump campaign. This resulted in a burst of publicity for both the hotel and the landscaping business.
