= Trinity Lutheran Church (Reading, Pennsylvania) =

Historic church in Pennsylvania, United States

- U.S. National Register of Historic Places
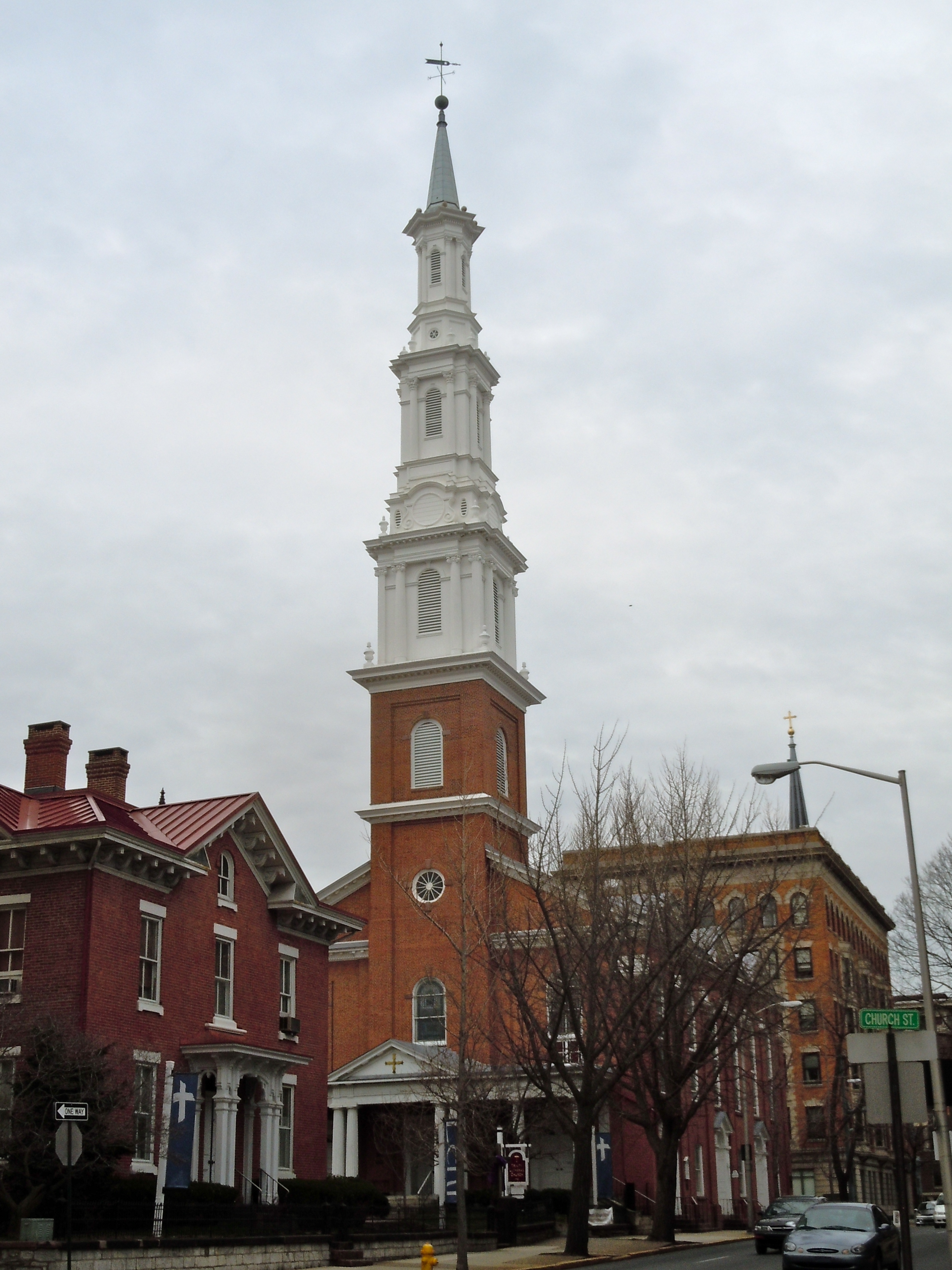
- Trinity Lutheran Church, March 2011

- Location within Pennsylvania Location within the United States
- Location: 6th and Washington Sts., Reading, Pennsylvania
- Coordinates: 40°20′13″N 75°55′35″W
- Area: less than one acre
- Architectural style: Georgian
- NRHP reference No.: 76001603
- Added to NRHP: June 7, 1976

Trinity Lutheran Church is an historic Lutheran church that is located at 6th and Washington Streets in Reading, Berks County, Pennsylvania, United States.

It was listed on the National Register of Historic Places in 1976.

== History and architectural features ==
The current church building was built in 1791, and is a two-story, three-bay by five-bay, red brick building with stone and wood trim. It was designed in the Georgian style. The second floor, which was added in 1851, has a square bell tower and steeple that was last replaced in 1963. The front facade features a columned portico that was added in 1900.

It was listed on the National Register of Historic Places in 1976.

Trinity remains an active presence in the Reading community. The Rev. Hans Becklin was called to serve as Senior Pastor in 2023.
