= Comcast Technology Center =

Skyscraper in Philadelphia

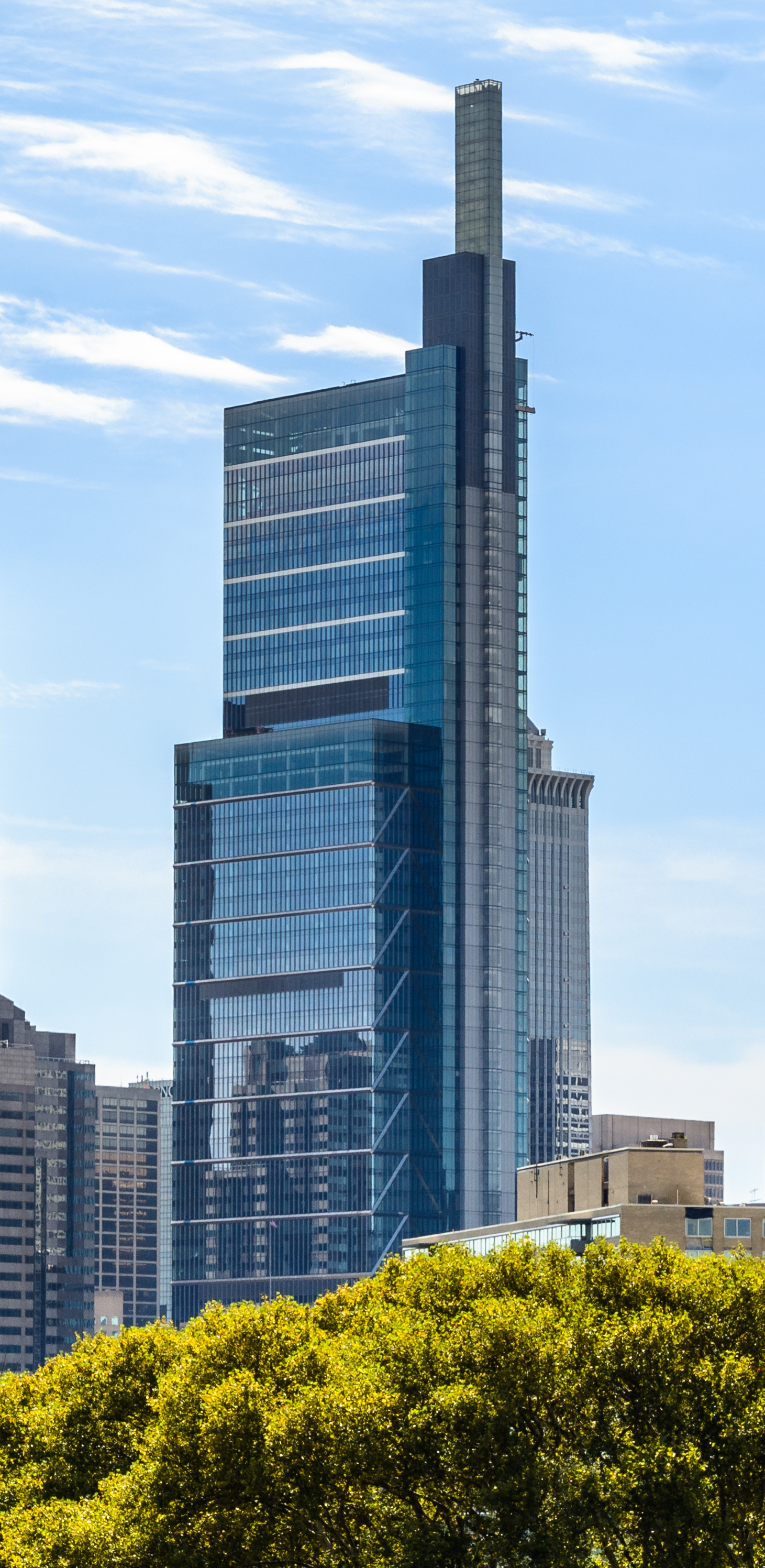
- Comcast Technology Center in September 2019

- Location within Philadelphia Location within Pennsylvania Location within the United States

Record height
- Tallest in Pennsylvania since 2017^{[I]}
- Preceded by: Comcast Center

General information
- Status: Completed
- Type: Hotel, restaurant, office, parking garage, retail, television studios
- Location: 1800 Arch Street, Philadelphia, Pennsylvania, U.S.
- Coordinates: 39.9549°N 75.1704°W
- Construction started: 2014
- Completed: 2018
- Cost: US$1.5 billion
- Owner: Comcast; Prologis

Height
- Height: 1,121 feet (342 m)

Technical details
- Floor count: 61
- Floor area: 1,566,000 ft^{2} (145,500 m^{2})

Design and construction
- Architects: Foster and Partners; Kendall/Heaton Associates
- Developer: Liberty Property Trust
- Structural engineer: Thornton Tomasetti

Website
- comcastcentercampus.com

The Comcast Technology Center is a supertall skyscraper in Center City, Philadelphia. The 60-floor building, with a height of 1,121 feet (342 m), is the tallest building in both Philadelphia and the state of Pennsylvania and the tallest building in the Western Hemisphere outside of Manhattan and Chicago.

The tower is located on the southwest corner of 18th and Arch Streets, one block west of the Comcast Center, the headquarters of Comcast Corporation. The company collectively calls the two buildings its Comcast Center Campus. A hotel, representing the highest hotel in the nation, and restaurant are located on the top floors. The building's central floors are offices for Comcast software developers and engineers, and the lowest floors have television studios and retail stores.

Construction on the building began in mid-2014 and was completed on November 27, 2017. The first personnel began moving into the building in late July 2018, and the tower was open to the public in October of that year.

== Design and construction ==
The lead architect was Foster and Partners, with Kendall/Heaton Associates the collaborating architect, and interior design by Gensler with Foster and Partners in collaboration. The L.F. Driscoll Company was the construction contractor. The tower contains approximately 1.566 million rentable square feet, including 1.334 million rentable square feet of office space, 230,112 square feet of hotel space, and 2,682 rentable square feet of retail space.

A set of five tuned sloshing dampers containing 125,000 gallons of water are located in the ceiling of the 57th floor, beneath the hotel lobby. The moving water is a counteracting force on windy days to reduce swaying of the upper part of the tower. A-shaped steel braces are embedded between hotel rooms on the east and west sides, to stiffen the upper part of the building against strong winds.

== Use ==
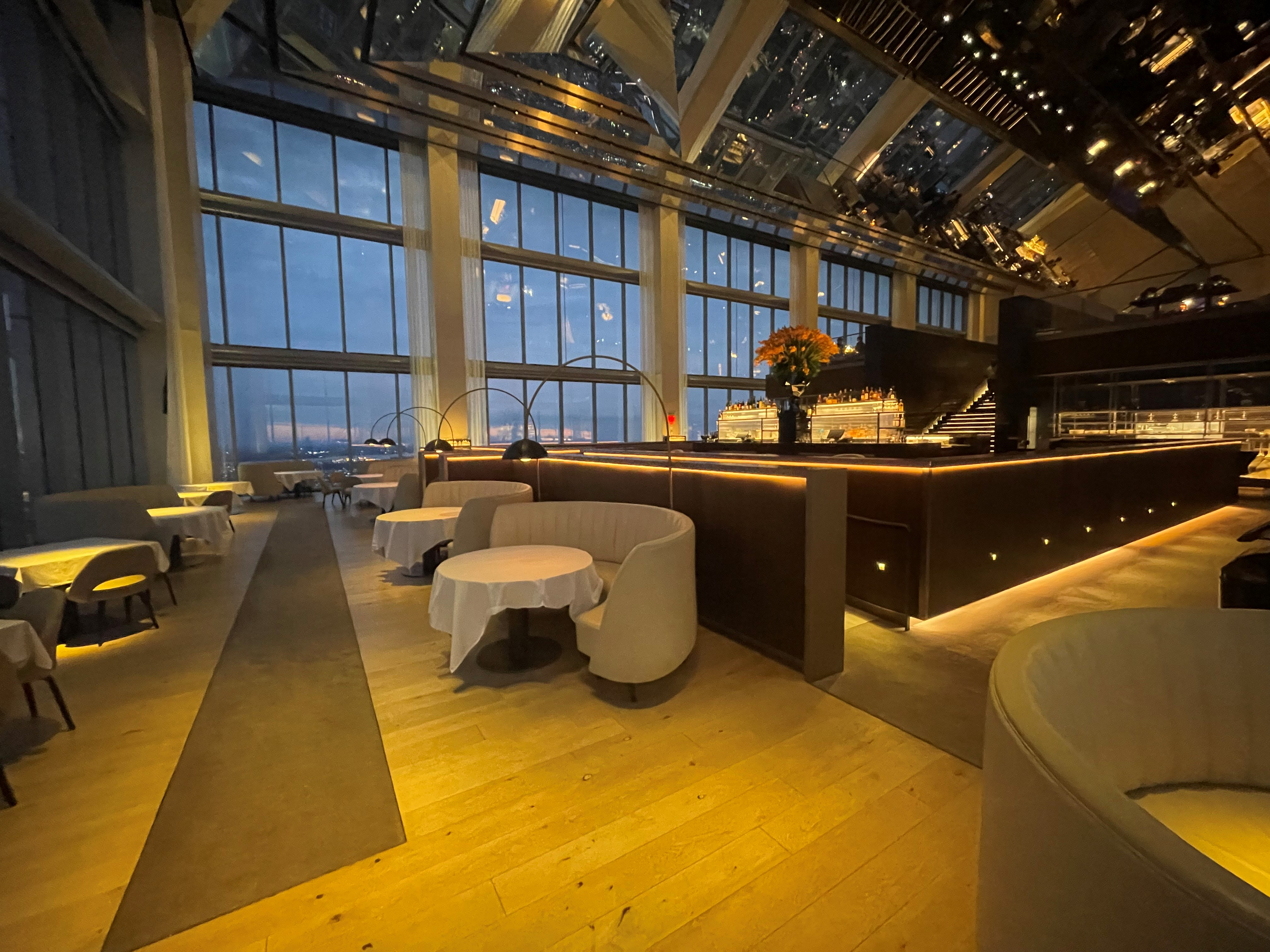
Inside the Jean-Georges Sky High restaurant on the 60th floor, in July 2022

The building consists primarily of workspace for Comcast employees and the Four Seasons Hotel, formerly on Logan Circle. The hotel is on the 48th to 56th floors with a lobby and restaurant on the 60th floor. Accommodations include 219 rooms, 39 of them suites. The building also includes television studios, restaurants, a retail mall, and a parking garage. The entire project contains about 1,566,000 square feet (145,500 m^{2}). The property is co-owned by Comcast and Prologis, and had an estimated construction cost of $1.5 billion.

Comcast's NBC owned-and-operated station WCAU (channel 10), along with Telemundo's owned-and-operated station WWSI (channel 62) announced plans to move their studio operations and offices from City Avenue, the Philadelphia–Bala Cynwyd boundary, to several of the lower floors of the building. The stations completed the on-air move on October 21, 2018, though some operations (such as the base for the station's news vehicles) will remain in Bala Cynwyd for the time being.

== Gallery ==
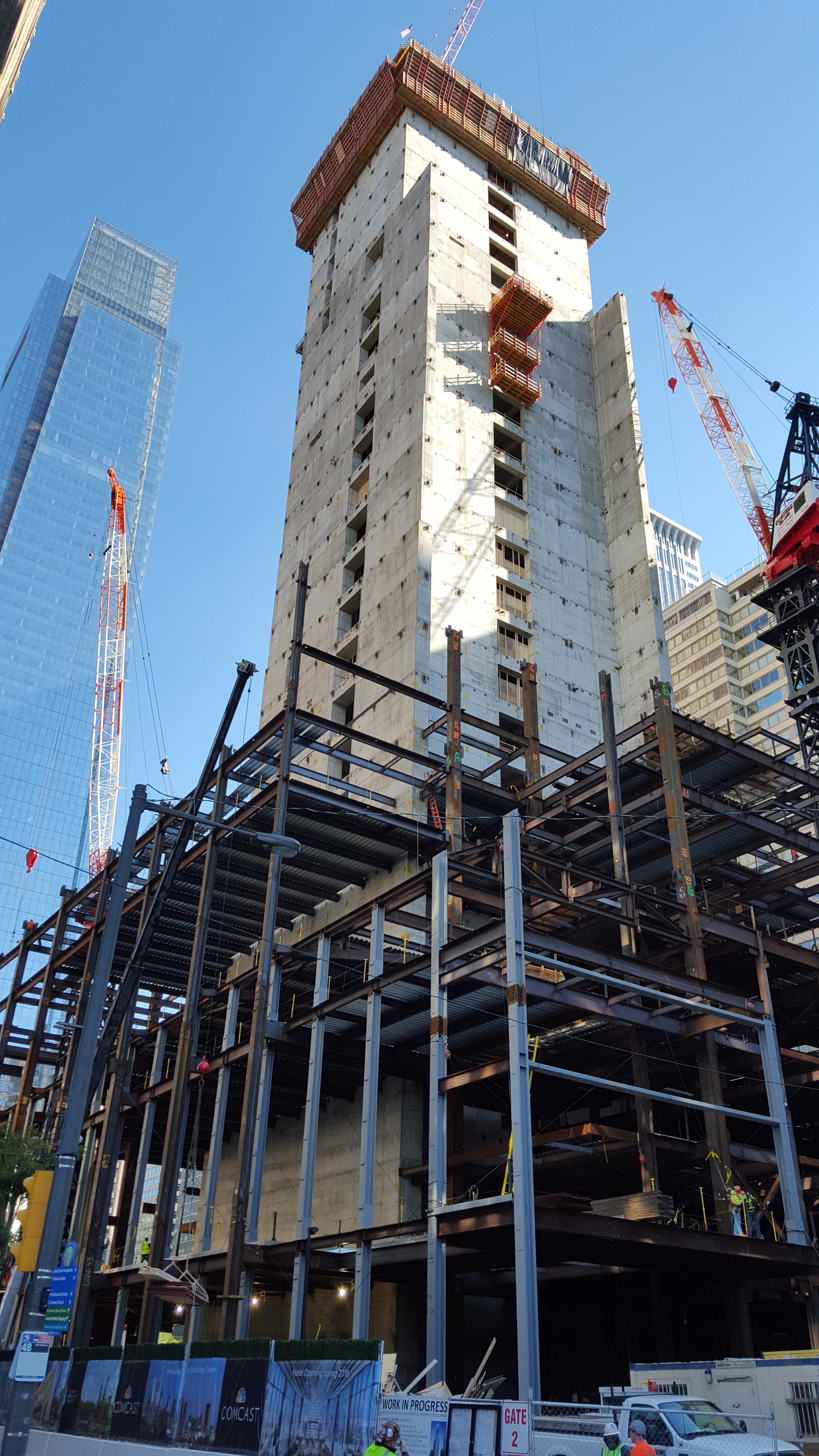
Construction from northwest corner, October 2015

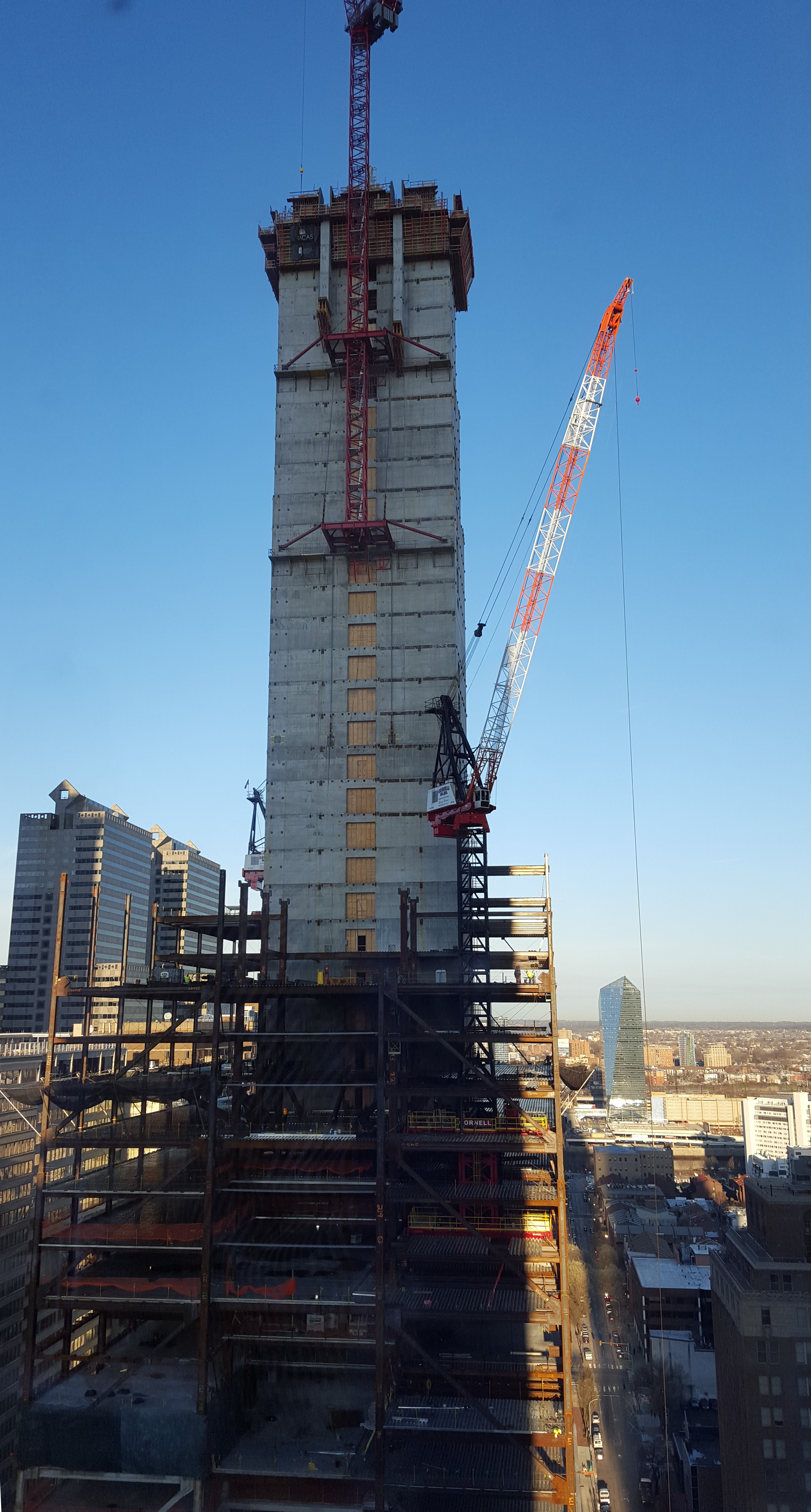
Construction of the concrete core, from inside the Comcast Center, March 2016

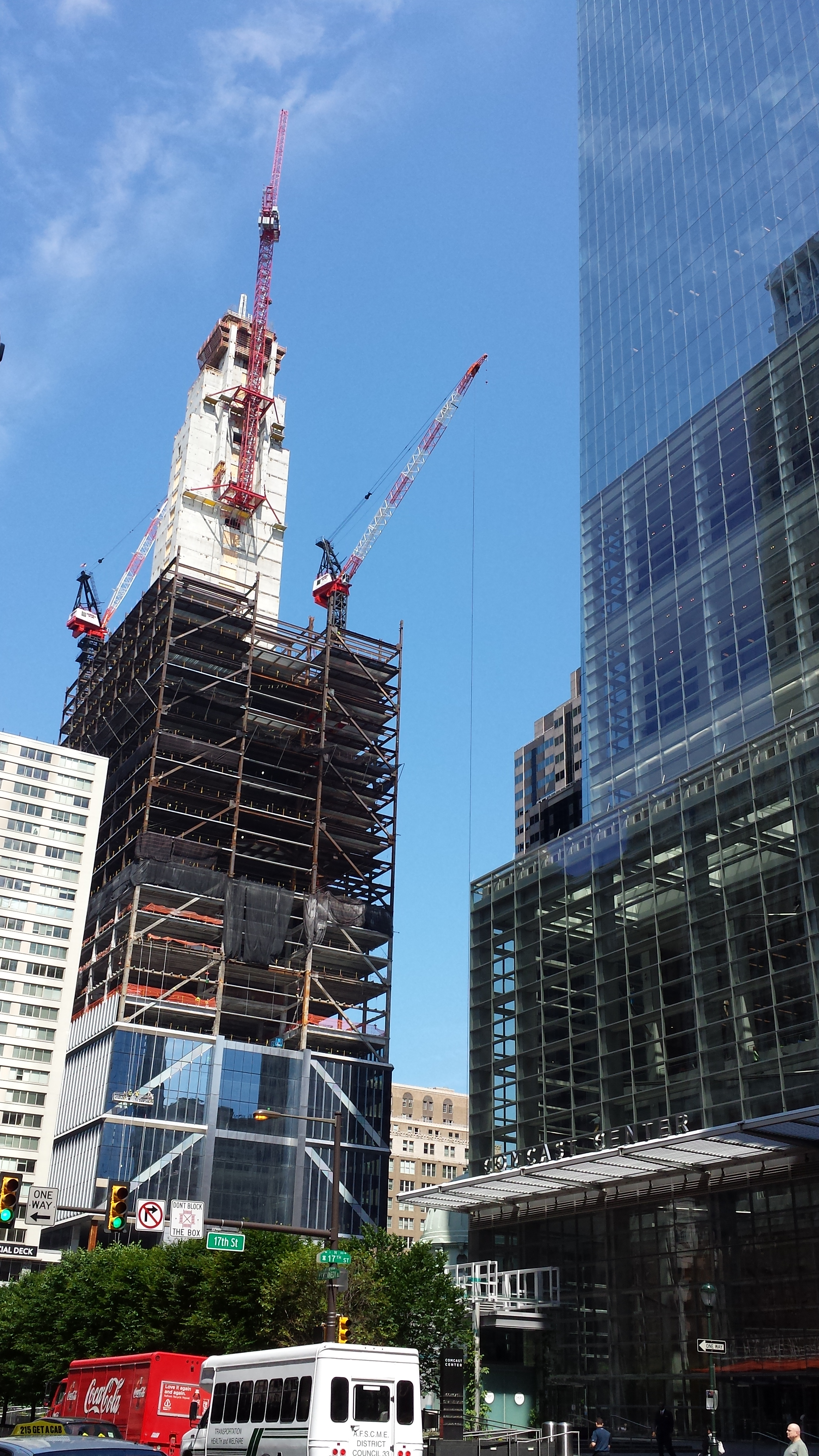
Construction from the southeast, May 2016

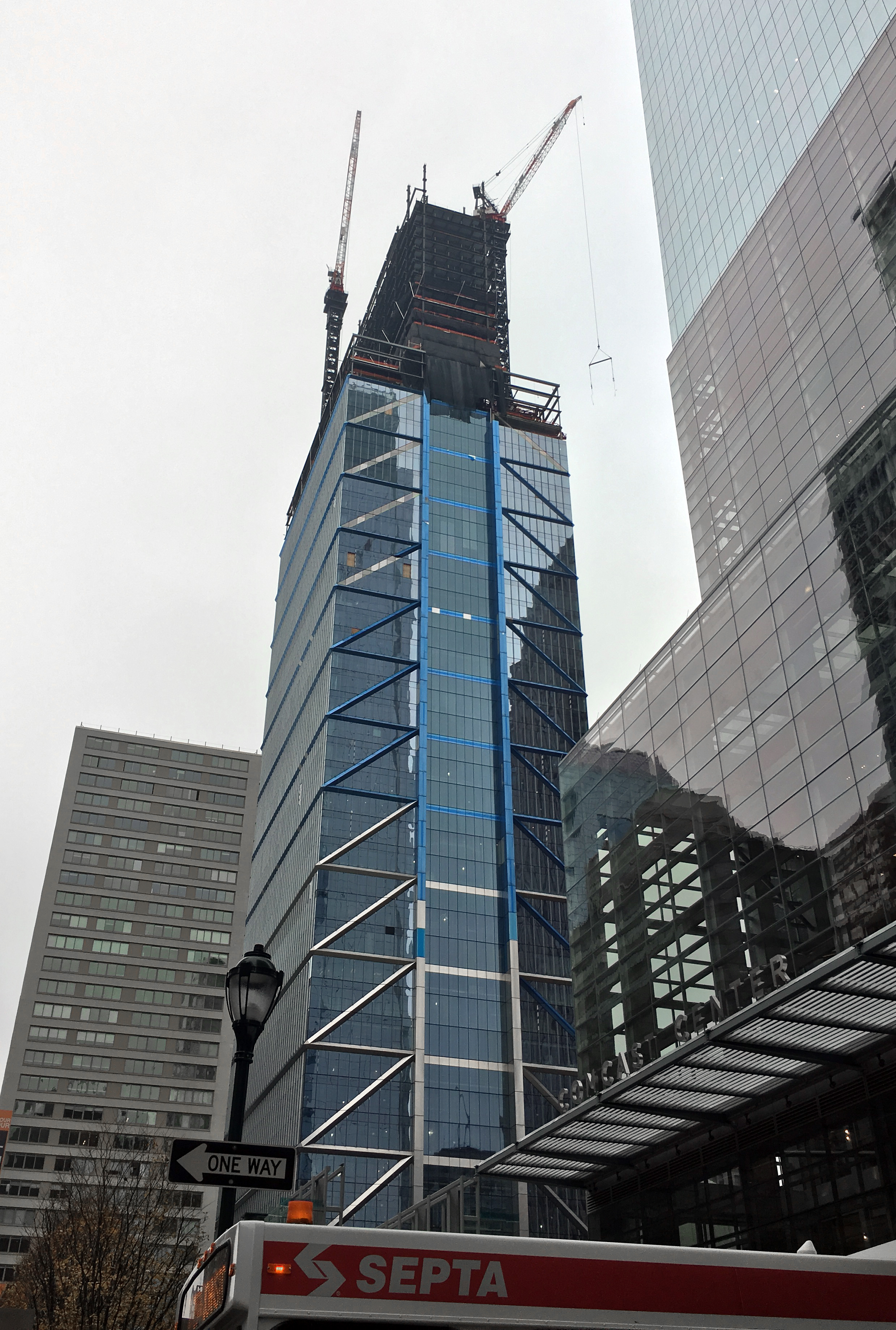
From the base of the Comcast Center, December 2016

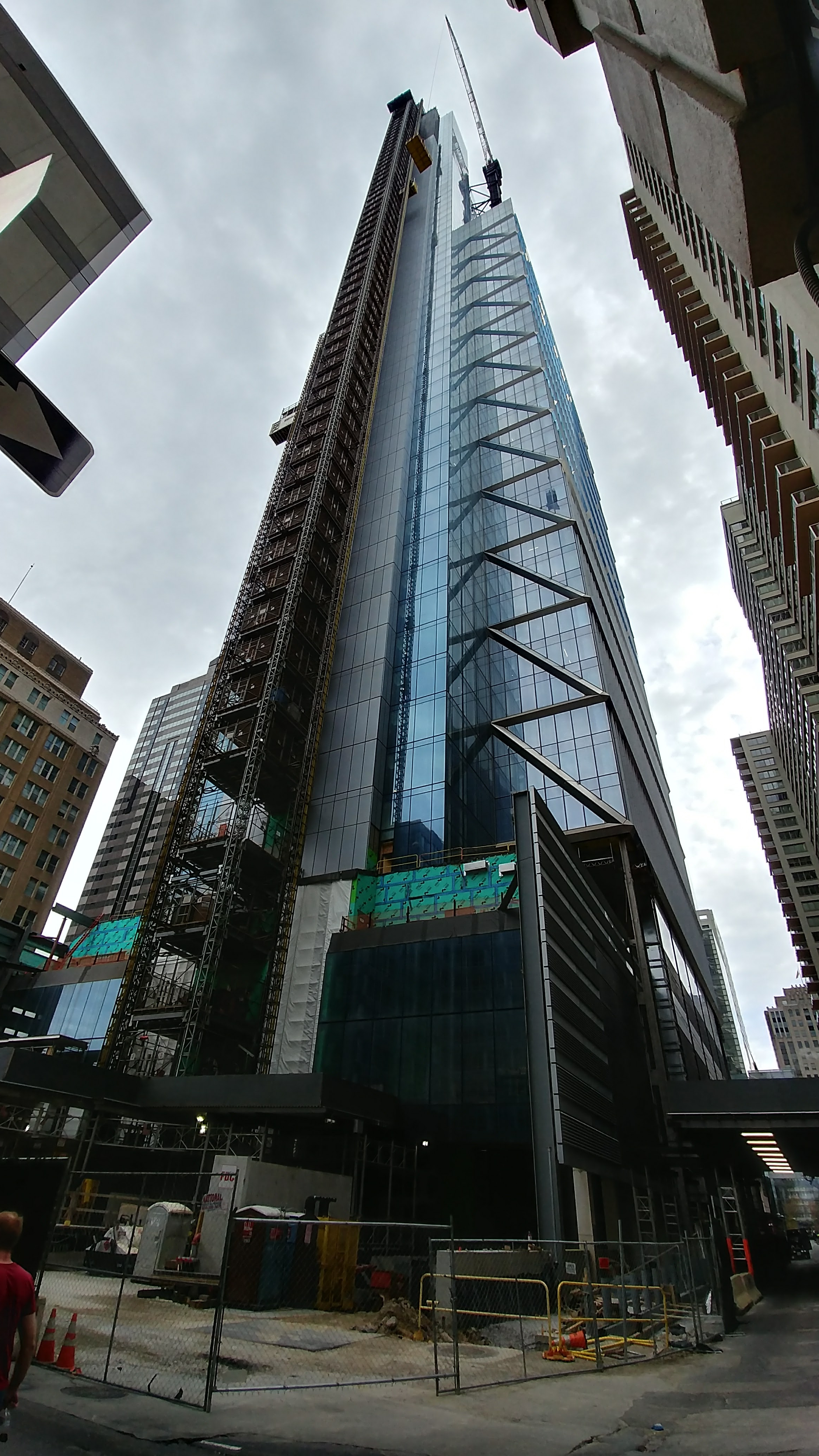
From the southwest corner, November 2017

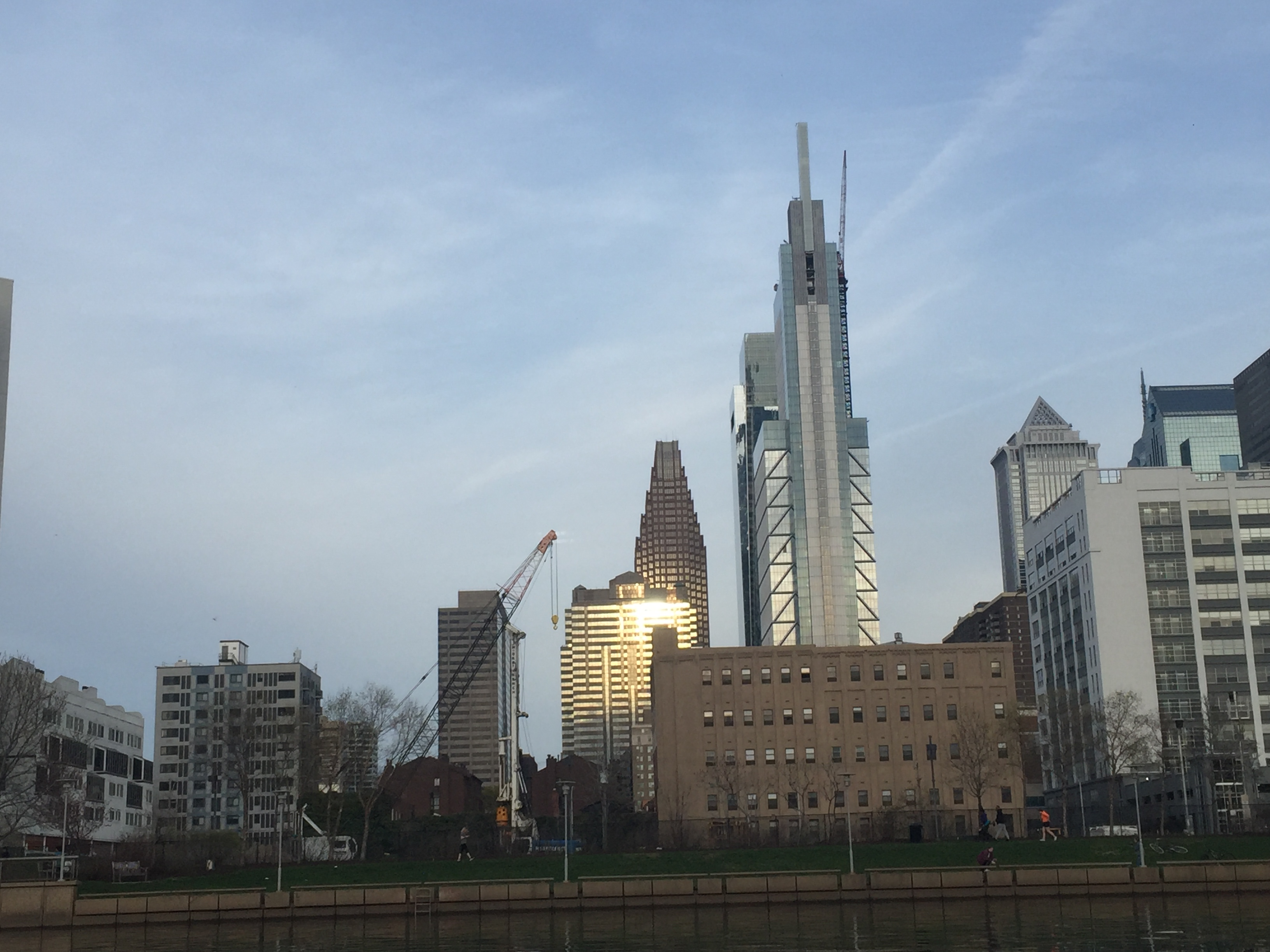
After top-off and prior to opening, as viewed from a kayak on the Schuylkill River, April 2018

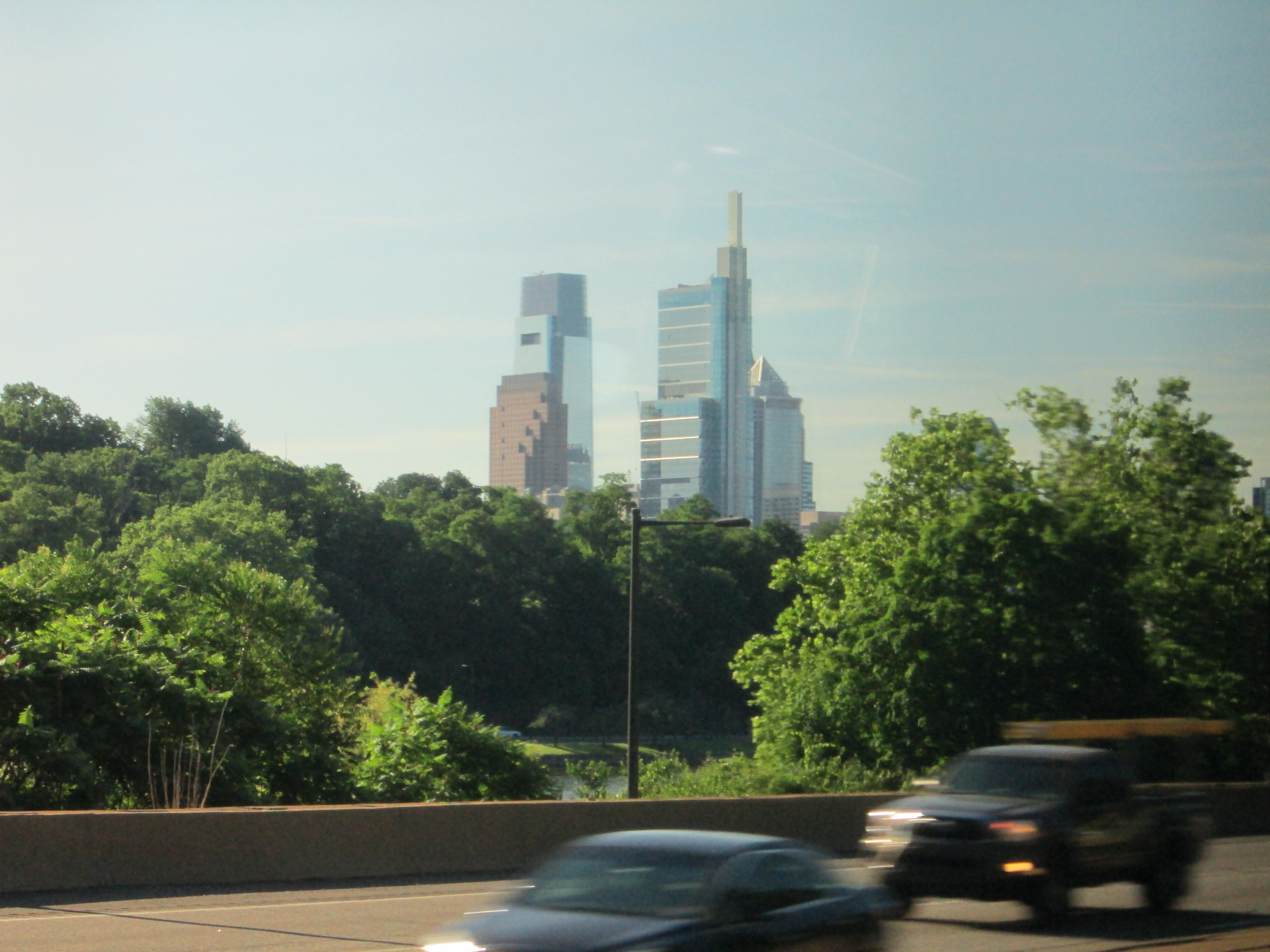
From Interstate 76, June 2018

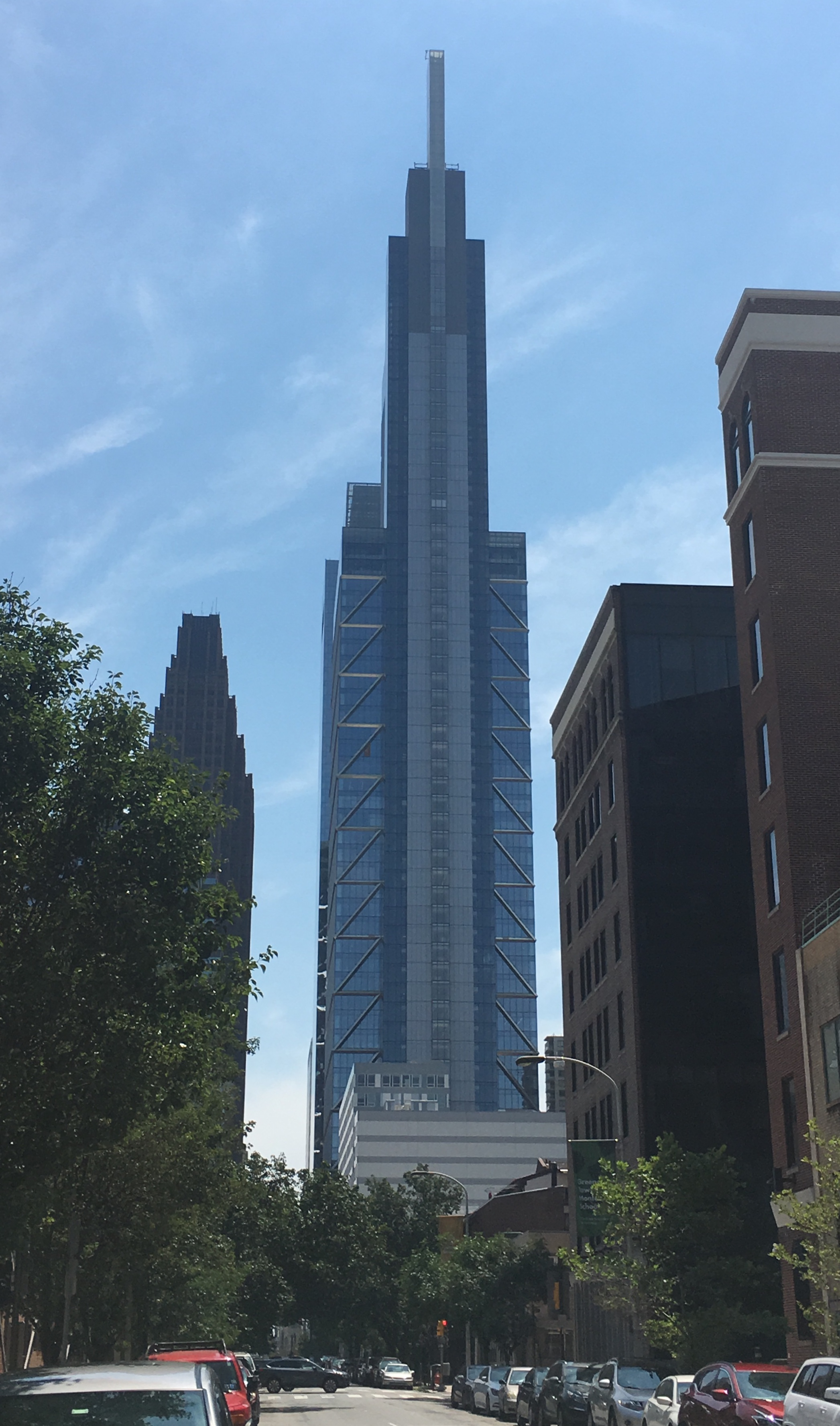
Nearly complete Comcast Technology Center, July 2018

== See also ==
- List of tallest buildings
- List of tallest buildings in Pennsylvania
- List of tallest buildings in Philadelphia
- List of tallest buildings in the United States

Records
Preceded by Comcast Center	Tallest building in Philadelphia; 342 metres (1,122 ft); 2018-present	Succeeded by Incumbent
