= Metropolitan Edison Building =

- U.S. National Register of Historic Places
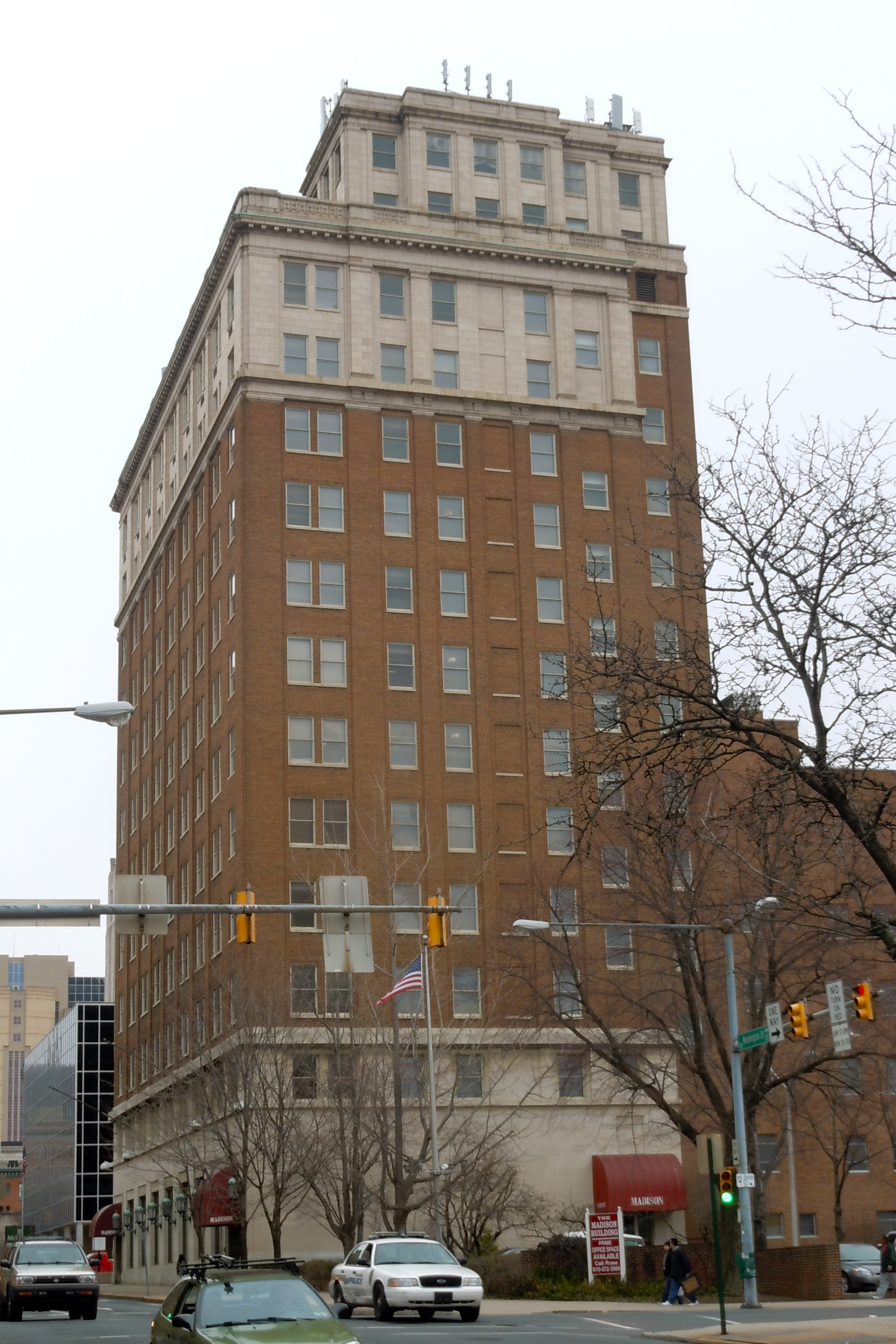
- Metropolitan Edison Building, March 2011

- Location within Pennsylvania Location within the United States
- Location: 412 Washington St., Reading, Pennsylvania
- Coordinates: 40°20′11″N 75°55′46″W
- Area: 1.1 acres (0.45 ha)
- Built: 1926-1927, 1956
- Architect: Multiple
- Architectural style: Chicago
- NRHP reference No.: 83004192
- Added to NRHP: October 28, 1983

The Metropolitan Edison Building is an historic office building that is located in Reading, Berks County, Pennsylvania, United States.

It was listed on the National Register of Historic Places in 1983.

== History and architectural features ==
Built between 1926 and 1927, this historic structure is a twelve-story, L-shaped, steel-frame building that was faced with Indiana limestone, brick, and terra cotta. Reflective of the Chicago style, it stands 150 feet tall. A five-story addition was completed in 1956. The building measures 119 feet, 8 inches, by 169 feet, 6 inches. It was the original home of the Metropolitan Edison Company, Gilbert-Commonwealth, and the CNA Insurance Company.

It was listed on the National Register of Historic Places in 1983.

== See also ==
- List of tallest buildings in Reading, Pennsylvania
