= John Neumann =

Czech–American Catholic bishop and saint

Saint John Neumann CSsR
- Bishop of Philadelphia
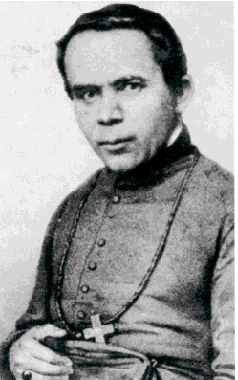
- Native name: Johann Nepomuk Neumann
- Church: Latin Church
- Diocese: Philadelphia
- Appointed: February 5, 1852
- Installed: March 28, 1852
- Term ended: January 5, 1860
- Predecessor: Francis Kenrick
- Successor: James Frederick Wood

Orders
- Ordination: June 25, 1836 by John Dubois
- Consecration: March 28, 1852 by Francis Kenrick

Personal details
- Born: March 28, 1811 Prachatitz, Kingdom of Bohemia, Austrian Empire
- Died: January 5, 1860 (aged 48) Philadelphia, Pennsylvania, United States
- Buried: National Shrine of Saint John Neumann
- Education: Charles University in Prague
- Motto: Passio Christi comforta me (Latin for 'Passion of Christ strengthen me')
- Signature: John Neumann's signature

- Coat of arms: John Neumann's coat of arms

Sainthood
- Feast day: January 5; June 19 (Czech Republic)
- Venerated in: Catholic Church (United States and Czech Republic)
- Title as Saint: Missionary, religious and Bishop
- Beatified: October 13, 1963; Vatican City, by Pope Paul VI
- Canonized: June 19, 1977; Vatican City, by Pope Paul VI
- Attributes: Redemptorist habit with a pectoral cross
- Patronage: Catholic education
- Shrines: National Shrine of Saint John Neumann, Philadelphia, Pennsylvania, United States

Ordination history
History
Diaconal ordination
- Ordained by: John Dubois
- Date: June 24, 1836
- Place: St. Patrick's Old Cathedral, New York, New York, United States
Priestly ordination
- Ordained by: John Dubois
- Date: June 25, 1836
- Place: St. Patrick's Old Cathedral, New York, New York, United States
Episcopal consecration
- Principal consecrator: Francis Kenrick
- Co-consecrators: Bernard O’Reilly (Hartford)
- Date: March 28, 1852
- Place: National Shrine of St. Alphonsus Liguori, Baltimore, Maryland, United States

John Nepomucene Neumann (German: Johann Nepomuk Neumann, Czech: Jan Nepomucký Neumann, Latin: Ioannes Nepomucenus Neumann; March 28, 1811 – January 5, 1860) was a Bohemian-born American Catholic prelate who served as the fourth Bishop of Philadelphia from 1852 to 1860.

An immigrant from Bohemia, he came to the United States in 1836, where he was ordained, joined the Congregation of the Most Holy Redeemer, and became the bishop of Philadelphia in 1852. In Philadelphia, Neumann founded the first Catholic diocesan school system in the United States. Canonized in 1977, he is the only male American citizen to be named a saint.

== Early life and education ==
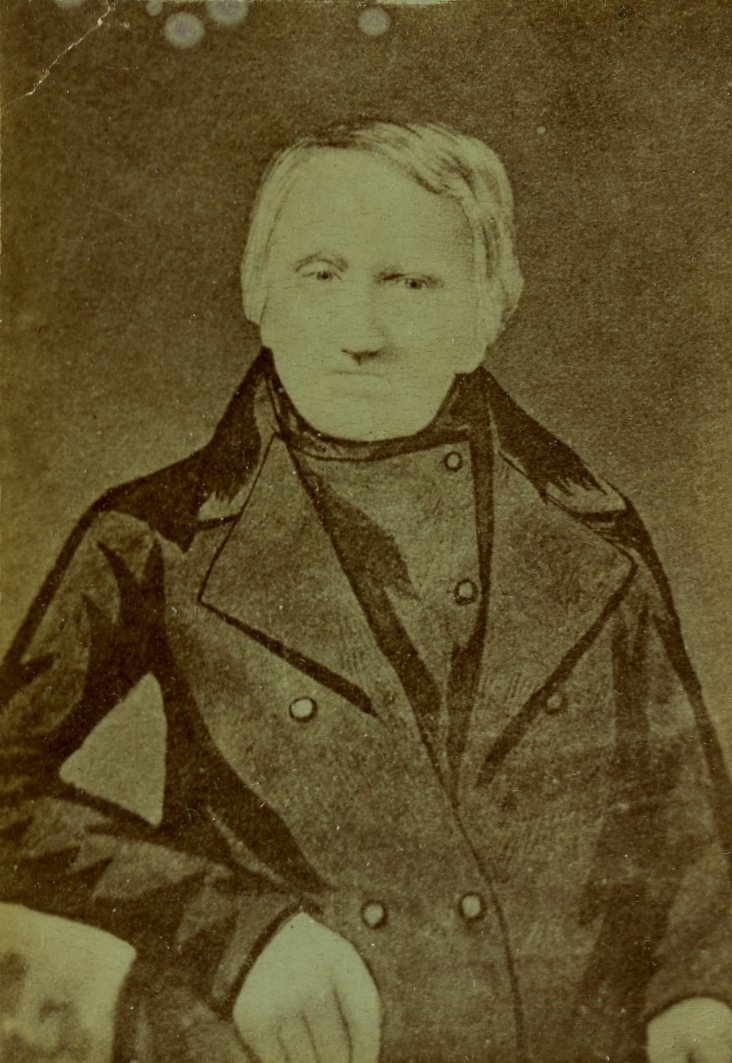
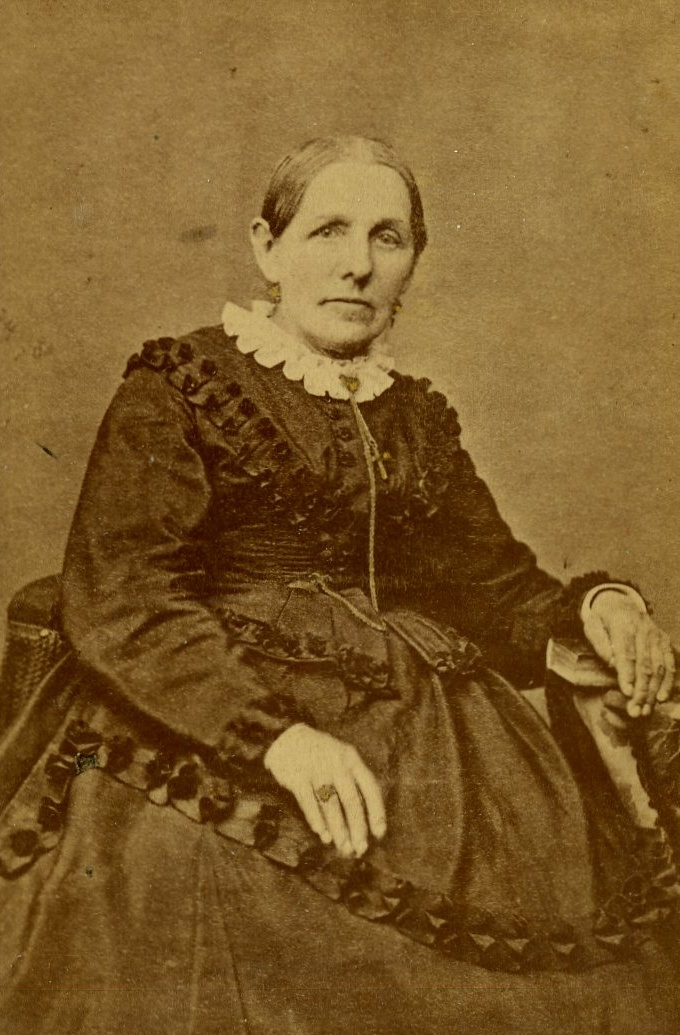
Neumann's father and mother, Philip and Agnes Neumann

Neumann's father, Philip Neumann, was a stocking knitter from Obernburg am Main in the Electorate of Mainz. He moved to Prachatice in the Kingdom of Bohemia (then part of the Austrian Empire, now in the Czechia) in 1802 at age 28 with his wife, Antonie Strakotinská. Antonie died in November 1804 during childbirth. Philip then married the daughter of a Czech harness maker, Agnes Lepší, on July 17, 1805; John Neumann was the third of their six children: Catherine, Veronica, John, Joan, Louise, and Wenceslaus (aka Wenzel).

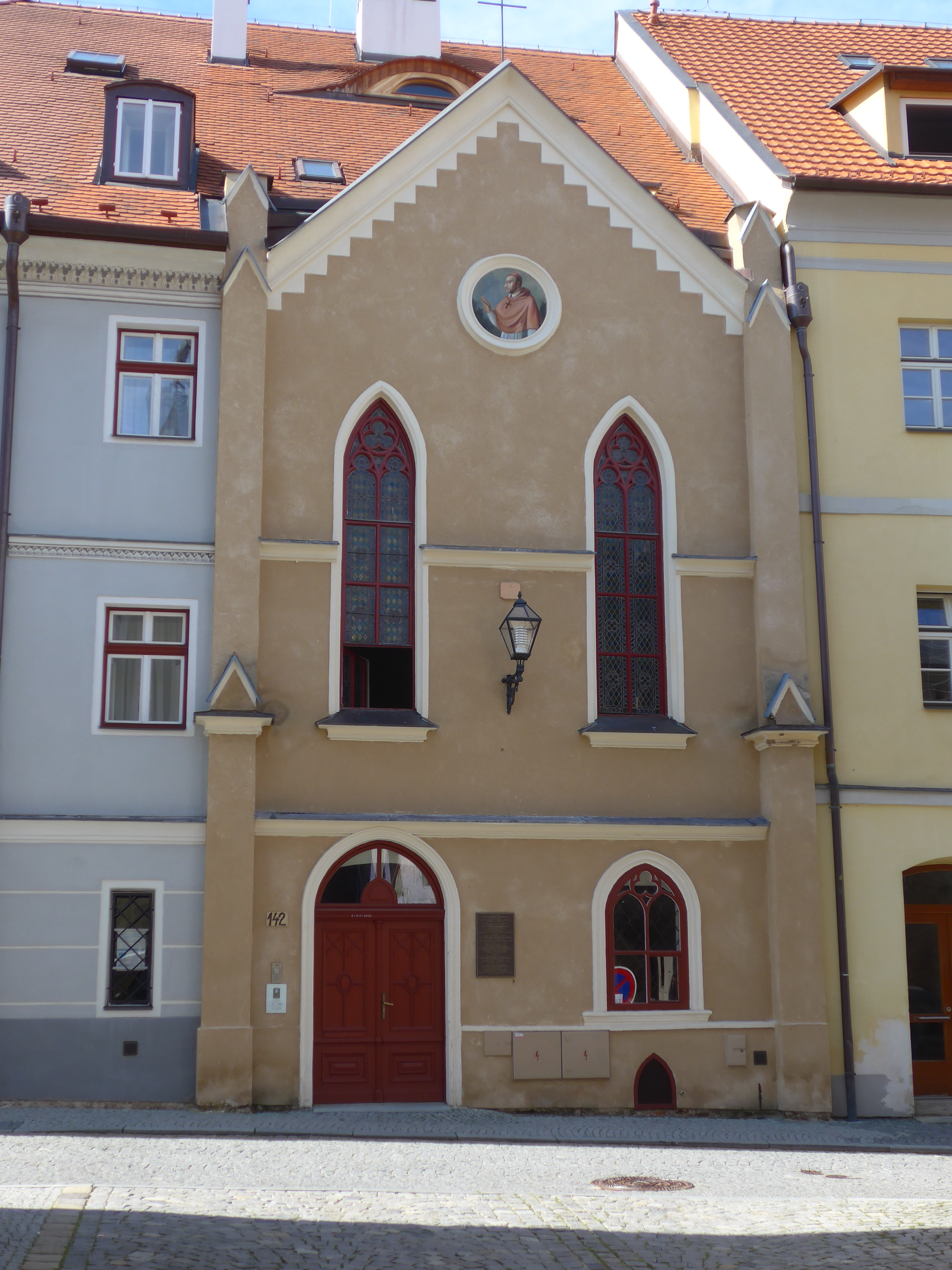
Neumann's birthplace

Neumann was born in Prachatice on March 18, 1811; he was baptized the same day in the village Catholic church. He began his education in the village grammar school when he was six. Neumann was a studious and hardworking child, with Agnes calling him "my little bibliomaniac" for his love of books and reading. Neumann spoke German at home and school. He also gained a passing knowledge of Czech during his childhood.

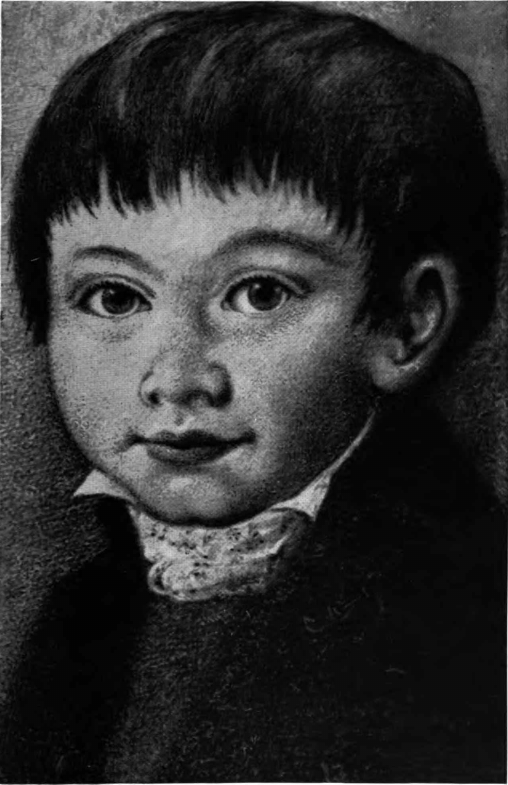
Portrait of Neumann around age ten

At age ten, Philip and Agnes told Neumann that they would allow him to further his studies gymnasium (secondary school) after grammar school. During this time period, most ten-year-old boys were sent to work. While in his final two years of grammar school, Neumann started Latin lessons with the catechist of Prachatitz to prepare himself for the gymnasium. In the autumn of 1823, Neumann passed the entrance examination, with distinction, for the Piarist School. This was a gymnasium in Budweis in South Bohemia that was operated by the Piarist Fathers.

=== Adolescence ===
==== Piarist School ====
Neumann in late 1823 entered the Piarist School in Budweis. His class had 103 students; fewer than 50 would ultimately complete the six-year course. The school curriculum covered Latin, mathematics, geography, history, and Christian doctrine in the first four years, then concentrated on Latin and Greek classical authors during the final two years. Neumann was disappointed with the course's slow pace in his first years. He believed that he could easily advance to the third year, but the school would not allow it.

In the middle of Neumann's third year at the Piarist School, his professor was dismissed for appearing before a public gathering while intoxicated. The school replaced him with a much stricter professor who increased the pace of instruction to make up for lost time. The new professor also believed in rote learning, which Neumann disliked. Twenty members of Neumann's classmates dropped out, but he remained. Neumann passed the final examination with a fair average, like he had in the first and second years.

Neumann's school grades suffered in his fourth year. He found it difficult to study in his boarding house because the landlady's son kept distracting him. Philip, thinking that his son was losing interest in his studies, encouraged him to come home and learn a trade. However, Agnes and sister Veronica told him to persevere. Philip then asked a professor vacationing in Prachatice to judge his son's academic progress. After speaking with Neumann, the professor told the family that his grades did not reflect his academic progress.

Now convinced that his son could do better in gymnasium, Philip moved him to a quieter and less distracting boarding house. Neumann's grades distinctly improved, except in mathematics, his weak subject. Though his fifth and sixth-year professor was stricter than the second-year one, the boy enjoyed the coursework. Neumann achieved his highest grades at the Piarist School during his sixth and final year. Neumann's hobbies at this time included playing the guitar and making images with a pantograph.

==== Philosophical Institute ====
After completing the Piarist School in 1829, Neumann began two years of study at the Philosophical Institute there. He was instructed by the Cistercian monks of Hohenfurth Abbey in Vyšší Brod. His subjects included philosophy, religion, higher mathematics, the natural sciences, and Latin philology. Neumann attained a better-than-fair grade average in philosophy, philology, and mathematics, improving in the latter subject. He excelled in botany and astronomy, forming a club with fellow students to discuss scientific subjects in their spare time.

After graduating from the Philosophical Institute in the summer of 1831, Neumann was faced with deciding to become a physician, lawyer, or priest. At the time, he seemed unlikely to join the priesthood. Neumann enjoyed science and secular poetry more than theology and the mystics. In addition, admission to the theological seminary of Budweis was difficult, especially as his family had no influential friends to recommend him.

Neumann decided to study medicine, and Philip prepared to pay the tuition for medical school. However, Agnes, sensing that her son really wanted to enter the priesthood, encouraged him to apply to the seminary. To Neumann's surprise, the seminary accepted him.

=== Seminary studies ===
==== Theological seminary of Budweis ====
Neumann entered the theological seminary of the Diocese of Budweis in Budweis on November 1, 1831. Neumann spent his first two years studying theology, which he enjoyed tremendously. The first year coursework included ecclesiastical history, Biblical archaeology, and an introduction to and exegesis of the Old Testament. He received the highest possible grade, eminentem, in every subject, including diligence and conduct. At the end of his first year, Neumann was one of the few men in his seminary class permitted to take the tonsure and the minor orders.

In his second year at Budweis, the coursework included Biblical hermeneutics, philology, Greek, pedagogy, introduction to and exegesis of the New Testament, and canon law. His grades were again very good, receiving the highest grade in every subject except in one semester of pedagogy. In his spare time, Neumann began to study French, Italian, and Czech.

Also during his second year, Neumann began to read the reports of the Leopoldine Society, a missionary society based in Vienna in the Austrian Empire. The Society spoke of the need for missionary priests in the United States, especially to serve the increasing population of Catholic German immigrants. On one occasion, Neumann and his fellow seminarian Adalbert Schmidt attended a lecture by the seminary director on the missionary activities of Paul the Apostle. The two seminarians each decided to become a missionary after completing their seminary studies. Neither mentioned this plan to the other until Schmidt finally did a few weeks after the lecture. Neumann teased Schmidt for the whole month before finally admitting, "I am going with you."

To become a missionary in the United States, Neumann had to learn English. However, it was not taught in Budweis. In early 1833, Neumann successfully petitioned Bishop Arnošt Konstantin Růžičkato of Budweis to allow him to transfer to the diocesan seminary affiliated with the Charles-Ferdinand University (now known as Charles University) in Prague in the Austrian Empire.

==== Charles-Ferdinand University seminary ====
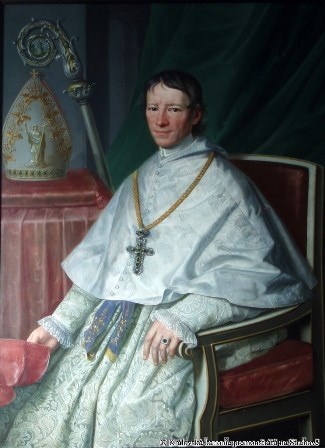
Jeroným Zeidler

Some sources say that Neumann began to attend the French lectures at Charles-Ferdinand. However, that became impossible when the state in 1834 restricted the activities of seminarians. Nevertheless, Neumann continued to study French independently and took the French language examination. He passed the examination with a very high grade despite missing some of the lectures. Unfortunately, the Charles-Ferdinand University did not offer instruction in English. Instead, Neumann studied an English language book and conversed with English workmen at a nearby factory. After a year, he could write portions of his diary in English.

Neumann found the lectures in the university disagreeable because of the Febronianism views of his professors. Febronianism favored a reduction in the power of the pope in favor of more control by national churches. Neumann regarded this doctrine as being heretical. The lector in dogmatic theology, Jeroným Zeidler, denied papal infallibility. There is no evidence that Neumann challenged Zeidler's beliefs in class. However, at one point, Neumann said that Zeidler had little influence among his students and could therefore inflict little harm on them. Neumann eventually wrote a treatise on papal supremacy that he sent to a friend in Budweis.

Neumann privately studied the Roman Catechism, along with works of the Italian cardinal Robert Bellarmine and the Dutch doctor of the church, Peter Canisius. Neumann also read the writings of the Church Fathers, especially the theologian Augustine of Hippo and Pope Gregory the Great.

Neumann's grades at the end of the 1833 to 1834 academic year at Charles-Ferdinand were again very high, though not as high as at Budweis. In his final year at Prague, Neumann studied pastoral theology, homiletics, pedagogy, and catechetics. His grades, while good, were the lowest of his four years studying theology. By this time, Neumann was able to use German, Czech, French, English, Spanish, and Italian, as well as Latin and Greek.

== Journey to America ==
=== Leaving Bohemia ===
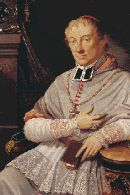
Bishop Růžička

While Neumann was in Prague, Schmidt was continuing his studies at the seminary in Budweis. He told his confessor, Hermann Dichtl, of their intentions to become missionaries. Through his correspondence with Andreas Räss, the director of a seminary in Strasbourg, Dichtl learned that Coadjutor Bishop Francis Kenrick wanted to recruit two German-speaking priests to serve in the Diocese of Philadelphia in the United States. Dichtl sent a letter to Kenrick recommending Neumann and Schmidt for the positions. However, correspondence between Europe and the United States was slow, and Dichtl received no definite response from Kenrick.

Neumann expected Bishop Ernest Růžička of Budweis to ordain him to the priesthood at the end of the academic year in 1835, but he became seriously ill in June. Neumann returned to Budweis from Prague for his canonical examination for the priesthood, which he easily passed. However, the Diocese of Budweis then cancelled all the ordinations of the graduated seminarians because it had no need for more priests. The cancellation was a blow to Neumann as he could not give the traditional first priestly blessing to his parents, nor have his family attend his first Mass.

When Neumann told his family that he was becoming a missionary, they were shocked and saddened; his sisters cried. In his diary, Neumann wrote that the bishop and canons of Budweis "more or less approved" of his plans. Dichtl still intended to send both Schmidt and Neumann to Philadelphia, but did not have the money for ship passage. In addition, the Leopoldine Society was unwilling to fund Schmidt and Neumann without a confirmation letter from Kenrick. Unwilling to wait, Neumann decided to start his trip to the United States anyway.

Neumann left his house in Prachatice on February 8, 1836, only telling Veronica that he was going overseas; his mother believed he was traveling to Budweis. He departed with 200 francs (approximately $40 (USD)). At this point, Schmidt had given up his plan to become a missionary, remaining in Budweis to serve as a diocesan priest. He did accompany Neumann from Bohemia to Einsiedeln in Switzerland. Neumann arrived on February 16th in Linz in the Austrian Empire. Bishop Gregory Ziegler of Linz extended his hospitality to Neumann and provided him with a letter of introduction. Neumann departed on February 18th for Munich in the Kingdom of Bavaria.

=== Munich and Strasbourg ===
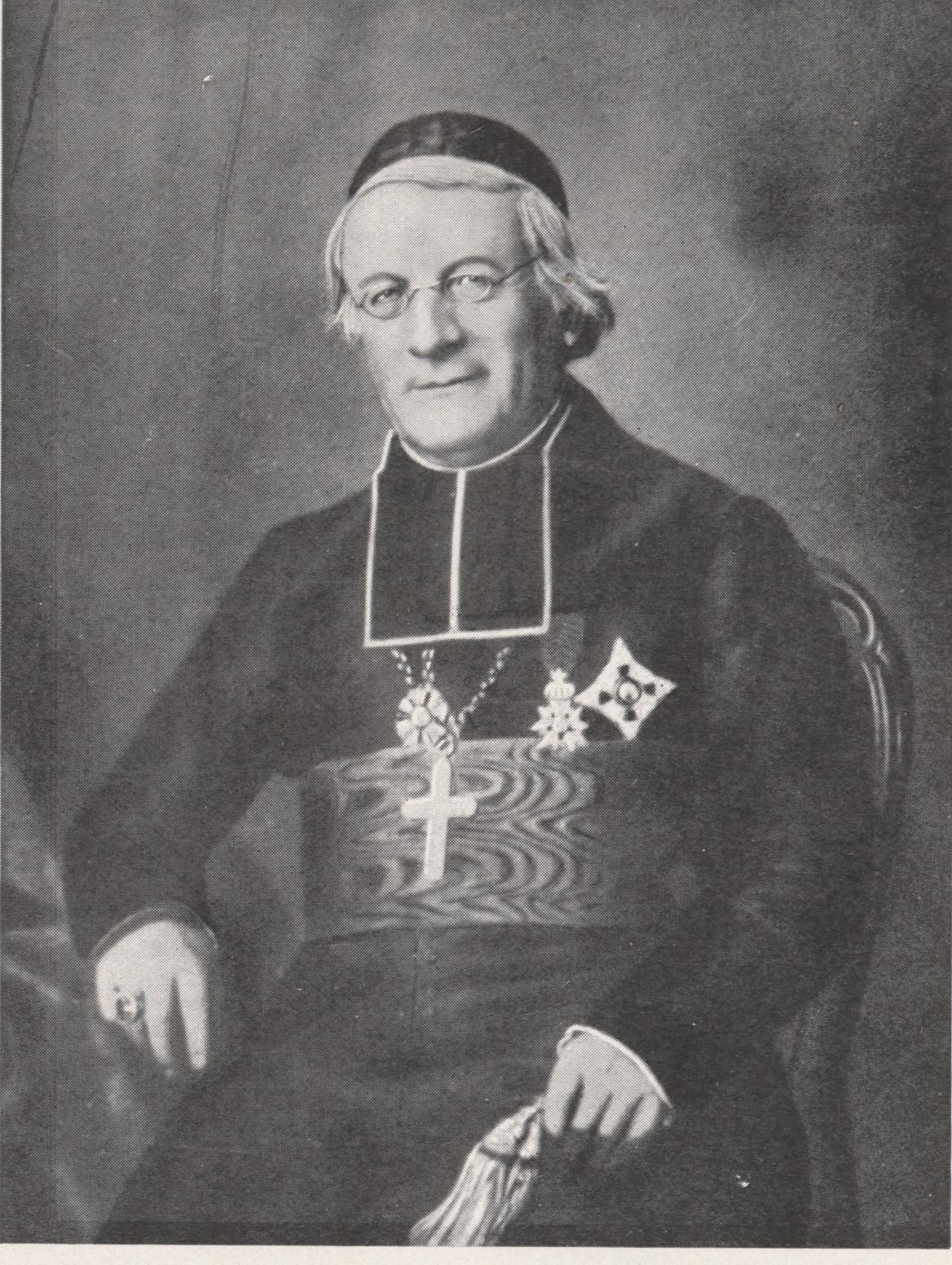
Bischof Räss

In Munich, Neumann was introduced to the missionary Swiss priest John Henni, who was serving in the Diocese of Cincinnati in the United States. Henni told Neumann that Kenrick did not need more priests in Philadelphia. However, Henni reassured him that he could find a position in many American dioceses, including Detroit, New York, and Vincennes. Henni also told him that he should stay in Europe until he received his dimissorial letters from Budweis.

The next morning, a professor at the Ludwig-Maximilians-Universität München advised Neumann to speak with the French Bishop Simon Bruté. He was currently visiting Paris, trying to recruit priests for the Diocese of Vincennes in the United States. Henni provided Neumann with Bruté's Paris address; Neumann sent him a letter.

Neumann traveled to Strasbourg in France on February 26th. He spoke there with Andreas Räss, canon of the Diocese of Strasbourg, who confirmed the bad news from Philadelphia. Räss also said that he had no money to give Neumann. However, Räss gave him a letter of introduction to a wealthy merchant in Paris who would assist Neumann financially. Räss also said he would write to Bishop John Dubois of New York, urging him to accept Neumann.

Neumann noted that Räss seemed cold and stiff towards him. However, Räss did assist him on his journey and gave him many books. Neumann left Strasbourg for Nancy in France, where he spent four days residing with the Sisters of St. Charles. He continued to Paris by way of Châlons-en-Champagne and Meaux. Another missionary bound for the United States, a priest named Schaefer, accompanied Neumann on this stage of his trip.

=== Paris and Le Havre ===
Neumann stayed a month in Paris, awaiting news from Bruté or Dubois. Neumann spent his time browsing book stalls and visiting attractions such as the Panthéon, the churches in Montmartre, and the Louvre. During Lent, he attended a Mass celebrated by the prominent French priest Henri-Dominique Lacordaire at Notre-Dame de Paris. Two weeks after Neumann and Schaefer arrived in Paris, Schaefer received a letter from Bruté accepting him for Vincennes. Neumann heard nothing from Bruté or Dubois. The funds from the Paris merchant did not materialize, and Neumann was running out of money. Finally, Neumann decided to spend what money he had left on passage to New York City without a position or his dimissorial letters.

Neumann left Paris and arrived in Le Havre on the French coast on April 7, 1836. He saw the ocean for the first time. Neumann chose to sail on the Europa, a 210 foot (64 m) three-master ship with a 60 foot (18 m) beam. He preferred a larger ship as it would be less crowded with passengers. It took Neumann four days to embark on the Europa. He spent the time praying in the local parish church and reading Francis de Sales' Introduction to the Devout Life. He also practiced his English and French with the locals.

The voyage to New York lasted 40 days. Neumann was seasick for three days, then recovered. For three more days, the Europa was becalmed and made no progress. When icebergs were spotted off the banks of Newfoundland, Neumann became chilled by the thought of what might happen if the ship should collide with one of them.

=== Arrival in New York City ===
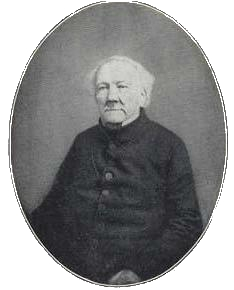
Vicar General Raffeiner

The passengers of the Europa sighted land on May 28, 1836. The captain anchored the ship outside New York Harbor for another three days. This was due to bad weather and for some sick people aboard to recover. If these people were still sick when the ship arrived, the American quarantine officials would require the Europa to transport them back to Europe. Neumann, anxious to get ashore, was refused permission to disembark by the captain six times. Finally, the captain allowed Neumann to take a rowboat to Staten Island. Several hours later, he took the small steamer Hercules to Lower Manhattan.

Neumann arrived in New York City with one tattered suit of clothes and one dollar in his pocket. A Swiss innkeeper in Manhattan directed him to a Catholic church. Its pastor, Joseph A. Schneller, gave Neuman the address for John Raffeiner, the vicar-general of the German Catholics in New York.

Neumann met with Raffeiner, who said that he had sent a note to Räss three weeks earlier, accepting him in the diocese. The two priests went to Dubois, who greeted Neumann warmly. After seeing sufficient guarantees of Neumann's education in Europe, Dubois told him to immediately prepare for ordination. Neumann asked for some preparation time, which Dubious granted, as he was leaving New York City for a visitation. When Neumann mentioned his lack of dismissorial letters, Dubois told him, "I can and must ordain you quickly for I need you." After the meeting with Dubois, Raffeiner took Neumann to his parish, St. Nicholas Kirche in Manhattan, assigning him to teach catechism to the children preparing for their first communion.

== Ordination ==
Dubois ordained Neumann to the subdiaconate at St. Patrick's Old Cathedral in Manhattan on June 19th and the diaconate on June 24th. Neumann was ordained to the priesthood on June 25th for the Diocese of New York. Neumann celebrated his first Mass the next morning, June 26, at St. Nicholas. During that Mass, Neumann made the following remarks:

"Oh Jesus, You poured out the fullness of Your grace over me yesterday. You made me a priest and gave me the power to offer You up to God. Ah! God! This is too much for my soul! Angels of God, all you saints of heaven, come down and adore my Jesus because what my heart says is only the imperfect echo of what Holy Church tells me to say." "I will pray to You that You may give to me holiness, and to all the living and the dead, pardon, that someday we may all be together with You, our dearest God!"

== Assignments as diocesan priest ==
=== New York City ===
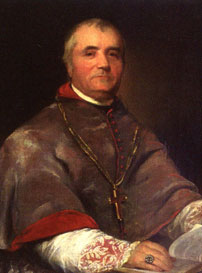
Bishop DuBois

The Vatican had established the Catholic hierarchy in the United States after the end of the American Revolution in 1783. Pope Pius VI had appointed John Carroll as prefect-apostolic of the United States in 1784 and then in 1789 as bishop of the Diocese of Baltimore, the first diocese in the nation.Until 1808, the Vatican regard all of the United States as mission territory, under the jurisdiction of the Congregation for the Propagation of the Faith (or Propaganda). There were no parishes in the strict sense. In his writings, Neumann always observed correct technical usage in referring to a portion of a diocese as a "mission," "congregation," or "quasi-parish." However, places where he worked are often described by more recent writers as parishes.

The Vatican erected the Diocese of New York in 1808. By 1836, the diocese encompassed all of New York State and the upper third of New Jersey. It was home to 200,000 Catholics, a population rapidly swelling due to immigration from the German states and Ireland. The diocese had 33 churches and several oratories, with 50 private homes serving as temporary places of worship. The parishioners were served by 36 priests, 31 Irish and three German; at least 15 more priests were needed. Räss had promised to send Dubois three priests, but Neumann was the only one who arrived.

=== Rochester ===
After Neumann's ordination on June 25th, Dubois assigned him to Buffalo, New York, to assist the priest Alexander Pax in serving recent German immigrants. The more senior priest in Buffalo, John Nicholas Mertz, was in Europe doing fundraising. Neumann departed for Buffalo on June 28th, traveling up the Hudson River by ship. Raffeiner had outfitted him with new clothes and provided money for travel expenses. While Neumann was traversing the Erie Canal, Dubois had asked him to stop briefly in Rochester, New York. The German Catholics in Rochester were then holding services in the basement of St. Patrick's Church, an Irish church under the pastor Bernard O'Reilly. However, they were raising money to build a national parish for German-speakers.

The Germans at St. Patrick's were delighted by the visit of a German-speaking priest. Some of them wanted Dubois to assign Neumann to Rochester permanently. Neumann began teaching the parish children, who were unable to speak either German or English correctly, and to celebrate the sacraments in German. After administering his first baptism, Neumann wrote in his journal,

"If the child I baptized today dies in the grace of this sacrament, then my journey to America has been repaid a million times, even though I do nothing for the rest of my life."

After a few days in Rochester, Neumann was relieved by the arrival of the German Redemptorist, Joseph Prost. Neumann's conversations with Prost prompted him to briefly consider joining the Redemptorist Order. However, Neumann continued to Buffalo on July 11th.

=== Western New York ===
==== Williamsville ====
After Neumann arrived in Buffalo in July 1836, Pax told him that he could select mission work in the city or in the countryside. Choosing the countryside, Pax assigned Neumann to serve three mission churches in the villages of Williamsville, Lancaster, and North Bush (present-day Kenmore), all close to Buffalo. Neumann decided to move to Williamsville, the home of Sts. Peter and Paul, its mission church. The town had 400 Catholic families, of whom 300 were German. Once in Williamsville, Neumann took a room at the residence of Jacob Philip Wirtz, a wealthy benefactor of the mission.

Sts. Peter and Paul Church in 1836 had only four walls with no roof. A local Protestant man had donated land to the Catholics on the condition that they construct a stone church that was 115 feet (35 m) long, 30 feet (9.1 m) high, and 20 feet (6.1 m) wide. He reportedly wanted it to be larger than the Methodist church in the village.The poor Catholic immigrants in Williamsville could not collect enough money to finish the building. Neumann eventually persuaded Wirtz to forgive a $400 loan that had been made to the parish; Wirtz's only condition was that a priest celebrate a memorial Mass for him every year after his death. Sts. Peter and Paul Church was finally completed.

Another problem was the small parish school in Williamsville, which held classes taught by a lay teacher. After firing the teacher for unsatisfactory conduct, Neumann taught at the school for the next seven months. He taught class two hours in the morning and two hours in the afternoon. His students later described him as a gifted teacher who related memorable stories in catechism class. Neumann frequently rewarded good students with small gifts. If a student complained of having a sore throat while singing the liturgy, Neumann would give them rock candy.

The building of a Catholic church in Williamsville raised tensions with the large Mennonite population there. When Neumann celebrated Mass at the unfinished Sts. Peter and Paul Church for the first time, some vandals threw stones over the walls, with one landing on the altar. Anti-Catholic posters were pasted on village buildings and Protestant evangelists tried to convert Catholics. While traveling between missions in the woods, Neumann was twice waylaid by assailants. He was rescued the first time by a Catholic man and the second time by members of the Tonawanda band of Seneca tribe. To diffuse tensions, Neumann asked to visit with Mennonite elders in their meeting house. During a theological discussion with the men, he quickly proved his superior knowledge of the bible. They then requested a public debate between him and one of their most knowledgeable members. Again, Neumann outmaneuvered his opponent at the debate. However, the debate did result in an end to harassment of Catholics in Williamsville.

While in Williamsville, Neumann faced his first problems with lay trusteeism. In many American Catholic congregations during the early 19th century, the parish corporation held the title to the parish property, not the diocese. Most of the corporation trustees were lay people who often acted independently of their pastor and bishop. Neumann avoided open arguments with contentious trustees in Williamsville; he smiled at them while ignoring their accusations. Some trustees construed his responses as being disrespectful

A controversy arose in 1837 with the trustees after one of them spread rumors about Neumann's living arrangements. The Wirtz residence occupied the top floors of a tavern. Due to the building's construction, Neumann could only enter his room by passing through the room of a young servant girl. The trustees called Neumann to a meeting in the tavern and told him the subject was about the servant girl and whether Wirtz should fire her, all to avoid the appearance of impropriety. Astounded that someone should insinuate that, Neumann delivered a quiet disavowal. The trustees became convinced that Neumann was incapable of violating his oath of celibacy and instead castigated the trustee who spread the false rumor.

==== North Bush ====
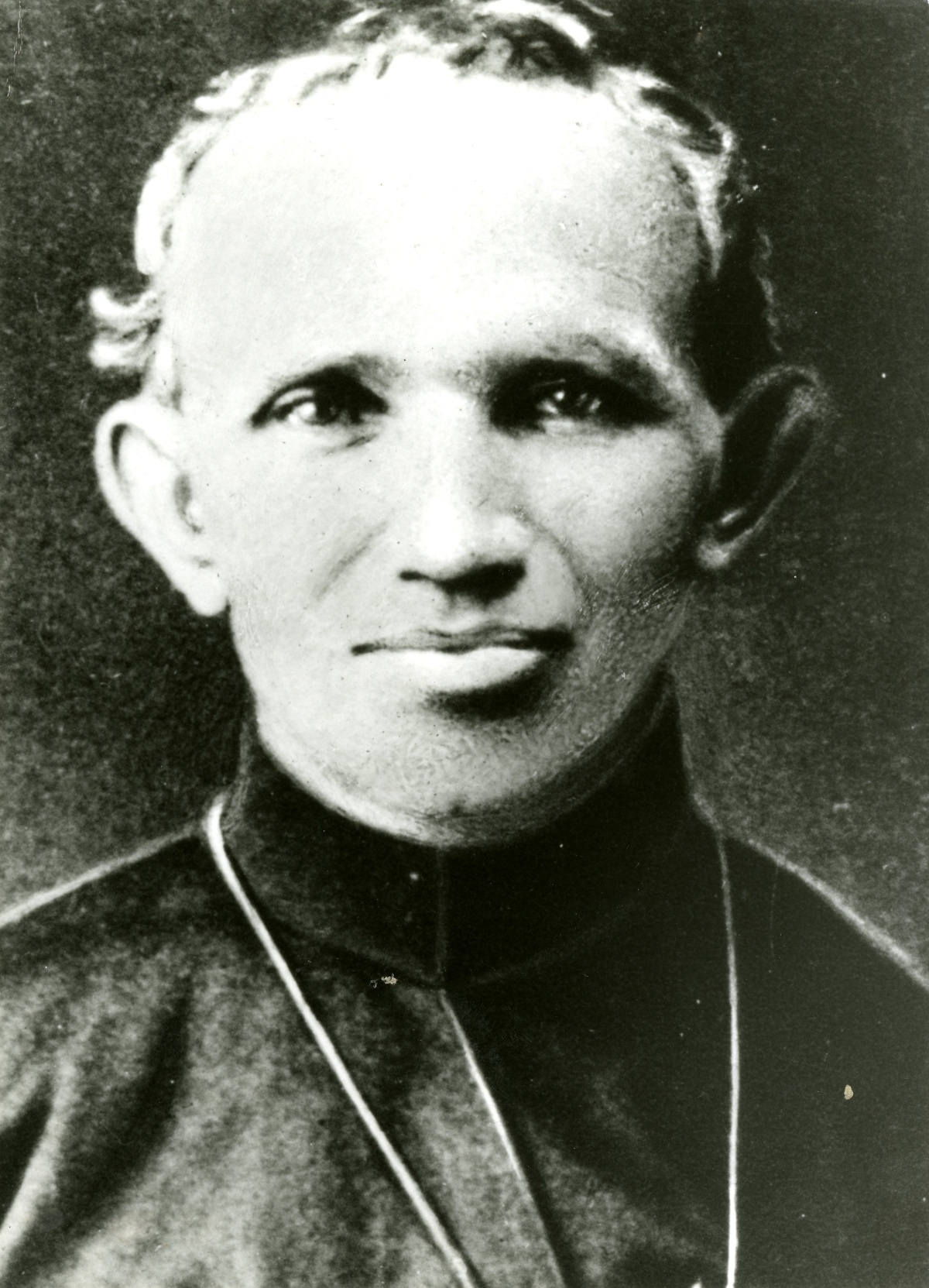
Wenzel Neumann

After the trustee meeting in Williamsville about the servant girl, Neumann decided in 1837 to move out of the Wirtz residence. He accepted free lodgings from John Schmidt, a Catholic who lived 1.5 miles (2.4 km) from St. John the Baptist Church in North Bush. Soon after his arrival in the village, Neumann erected a school there, where he started teaching.

Every morning, Neumann walked over an almost impassable road to St. John the Baptist to say his daily Mass. In his three villages, Neumann averaged 65 baptisms a year and eight marriages. Neumann frequently visited the sick, aided the dying, baptized babies, and counseled those having trouble with their faith. Shortly after the move to North Bush, Dubois arrived on a visitation tour of the area. He expressed his pleasure upon seeing the construction of church buildings and schools. Dubois also noted Neumann's careful attention to the sick and the dying, and his weekly, even daily, rounds.

Neumann soon started covering far-flung mission churches in the villages of Transit, Sheldon, Batavia, Pendleton, and Tonawanda in addition to his three assigned churches. The nearest of these new missions was two hours away from North Bush, the furthest 12 hours. He travelled there by foot, carrying a heavy pack containing his vestments. Neumann walked many swampy roads during cold, snowy winters and hot summers. He returned home to North Bush almost every night; the missions had no room for him, and he needed to teach school in North Bush every day.

Concerned for Neumann's health, his congregants persuaded him to get a horse. Having never learned horseback riding, he struggled to master it. Because he was only 5 ft 2 1/2 in (1.59 m) tall, his feet did not reach the stirrups; people laughed at his attempts to get in the saddle. He fell off the horse several times and was thrown off once. After that, Neumann led the horse by the bridle until he learned to properly ride it. Through persistence, he became a fair horseman and developed a good relationship with his horse. On one occasion, the horse ate a collection of botanical specimens that Neumann was planning to send to his family in Bohemia.

Neumann's move from Williamsville to North Bush coincided with the economic depression that followed the financial Panic of 1837 in the United States. Many Catholics in Western New York were now unemployed and struggling to obtain food; they could give little or nothing to support the mission churches or Neumann. He wrote to a fellow priest in Europe, "If you want to be a missionary, you have to love poverty and be entirely disinterested." Although $80 in debt at the end of 1836, Neumann survived, thanks to gifts of corn and potatoes from his congregants.

To ease some of Neumann's burdens, the Catholics in North Bush bought 5 acres (2.0 ha) of land close to St. John the Baptist to build him a residence. He worked with his parishioners to construct a two-room log cabin. He now had land to grow some of his food, along with a shorter commute to St. John's. However, Neumann's neighbors rarely saw smoke coming from his chimney, indicating that he was not lighting a fire to cook many meals. On one occasion, Neumann said that he subsisted on bread alone for four weeks. When visiting the homes of parishioners. he never asked for a meal.

Neumann was unsuccessful in his attempts to recruit more priests from Europe to come to New York. However, in September 1839, Neumann's brother Wenzel immigrated from Bohemia to assist his brother. He took over the cooking at Neumann's log cabin as well as his teaching responsibilities. Wenzel helped build churches, schoolhouses, and rectories. He also brought Neumann the first news he'd had of his family in three years, for none of their letters had reached him since he left Europe.Neumann opened a third schoolhouse at Lancaster in December 1839.

== Joining the Redemptorists ==
=== Physical and spiritual breakdown ===
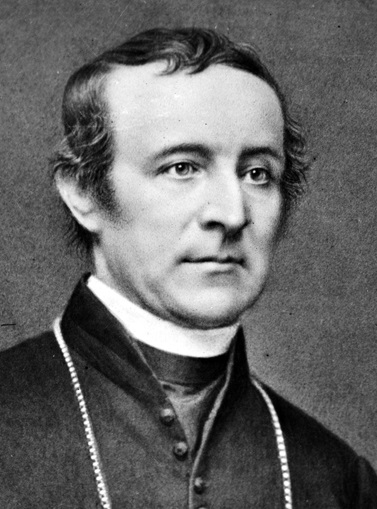
Bishop Hughes

After several years of an exhausting workload in the severe climate of Western New York, Neumann suffered a health breakdown in the summer of 1840. He was forced to stop all his pastoral work for three months. During this recovery period, Neumann underwent a spiritual crisis. Not used to being idle, he began seeing himself as lazy and proud. He feared that his faith in God was diminishing. The people around him saw a humble, dedicated priest who had burned himself out from overwork. Neumann was also suffering from loneliness.

Neumann sent a letter that summer to Prost discussing his spiritual difficulties. Now the superior for the Redemptorists in the United States, Prost replied that living alone was difficult for a priest, quoting Ecclesiastes in the Old Testament, "woe to him who is alone!" After much self-examination, Neumann finally realized that he needed the company of other priests. He spoke about this several times with Pax, who served as Neumann's confessor. Pax finally told Neumann that it was his vocation to serve as a priest in a religious order.

=== Leaving the diocese ===
On September 4, 1840, Neumann wrote to Prost, asking to join the Redemptorists. Receiving a favorable reply from Prost on September 16th, Neumann immediately wrote to Bishop John Hughes of New York. Neumann said that he was leaving the diocese and asked Hughes to assign one or more priests to Neumann's churches. There was no immediate reply from Hughes as he was out of town. Not waiting for an answer, Neumann left New York for the long trip to Pittsburgh, Pennsylvania, one of the Redemptorist centers, on October 8 or 9, 1840. He left it with Pax and Prost to correspond with Hughes.

When Hughes learned of Neumann's request, he wanted Neumann to stay as he was a valuable pastor. However, Prost convinced Hughes that he had no control of the matter, later writing,

"I appealed to canon law and pointed out that I could not refuse to accept him, even if I wished to. The Most Reverend Bishop was obliged to yield. "

Wenzel remained in New York to gather his brother's possessions from all the mission churches. He later followed Neumann to Pittsburgh, where he joined the Redemptorists as a lay brother. Hughes then finally resolved Neumann's problem with the missing dimissorial letters.

=== Novitiate period ===
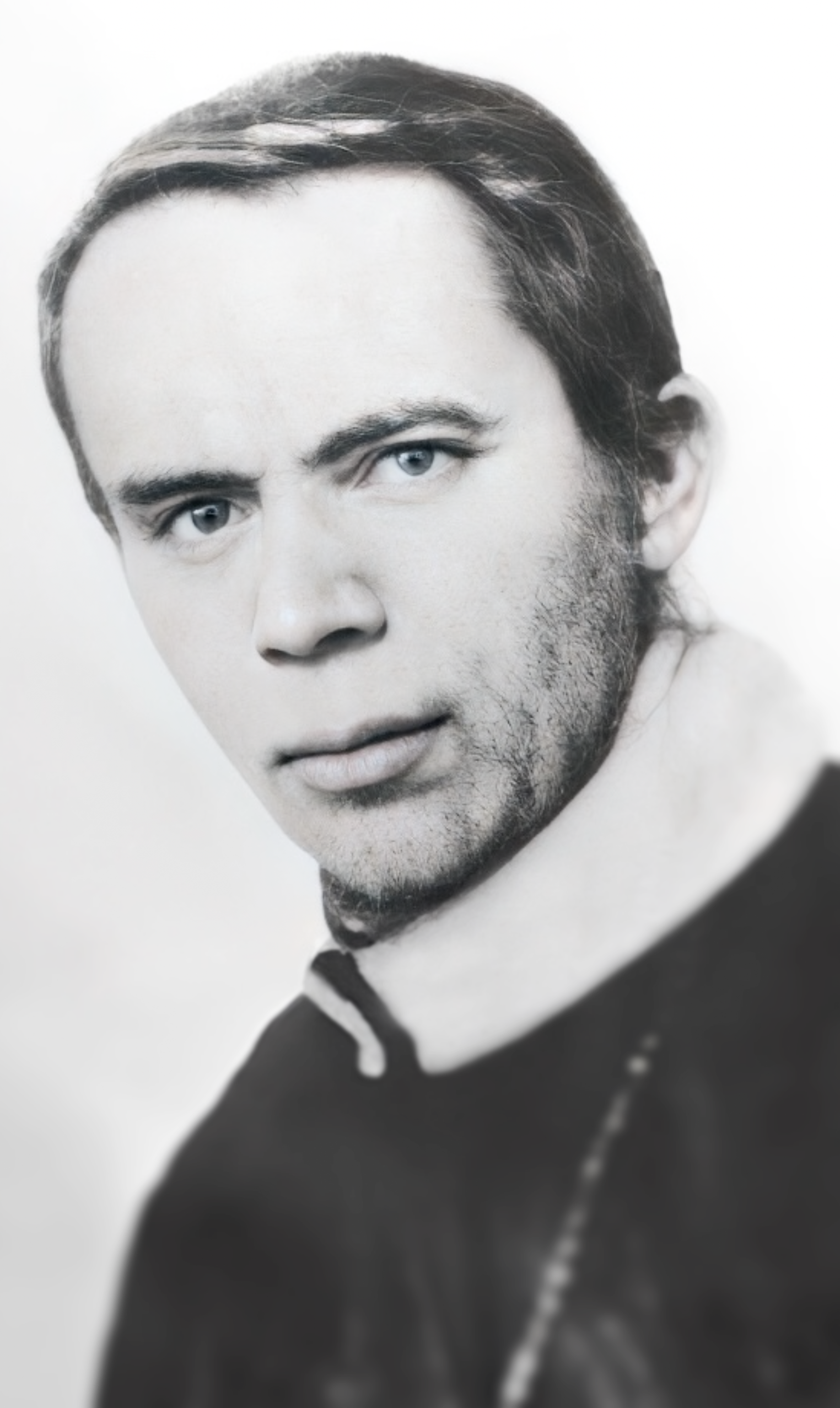
John Neumann

The Redemptorist priest Joseph Passerat, who ran the order from 1820 to 1848, sent their first missionaries to the United States in 1832. The missionaries established the first Redemptorist foundation in Pittsburgh in April 1839, taking over St. Philomena's Church in that city. When Neumann joined them, the order had four foundations: St. Philomena's, St. John's in Baltimore, St. Joseph's in Rochester, and St. Alphonsus' in Norwalk, Ohio.

Neumann arrived in Pittsburgh on October 18, 1840, a Sunday. The Redemptorists invited him to sing the Requiem High Mass and deliver a homily, which he did despite his tiring journey. Prost hurried to Pittsburgh to invest Neumann into the order. As this was the first Redemptorist investiture in North America, the priests wished to make it a correct ceremony. Unfortunately, their only copies of the investiture ritual had been destroyed by fire in New York City. Drawing on memories of their own investitures, the priests devised a suitable ceremony for Neumann.

After his investiture, the Redemptorists in September 1841 sent Neumann to serve for three months at the Peru St. Alphonsus Parish in Peru Township, Huron County, Ohio.

=== Religious vows ===
Neumann left Ohio to go to Baltimore in January 1842 to take his religious vows. During this period, he spent much of his time working with German immigrants in that city.

In 1843, the Oblate Sisters of Providence, an order of African-American nuns in Baltimore, was on the verge of dissolution. Their founder, James Nicholas Joubert, had died and Archbishop Samuel Eccleston refused to help them. Neumann noticed the nuns visiting St. Alphonsus Church in that city and introduced himself to them. After learning about their predicament, he offered to help them in any way he could. Neumann later recruited Thaddeus Anwander, a new priest, to serve as the sisters' new spiritual director. After much pleading, Anwander persuaded Eccleston to save the order.

Neumann was appointed the vice-provincial superior of the American Redemptorists in 1846. He was naturalized as an American citizen in Baltimore in 1848. Neumann left his position as vice-provincial superior in 1849 to serve as pastor of St. Alphonsus Parish in Baltimore.

== Bishop of Philadelphia ==
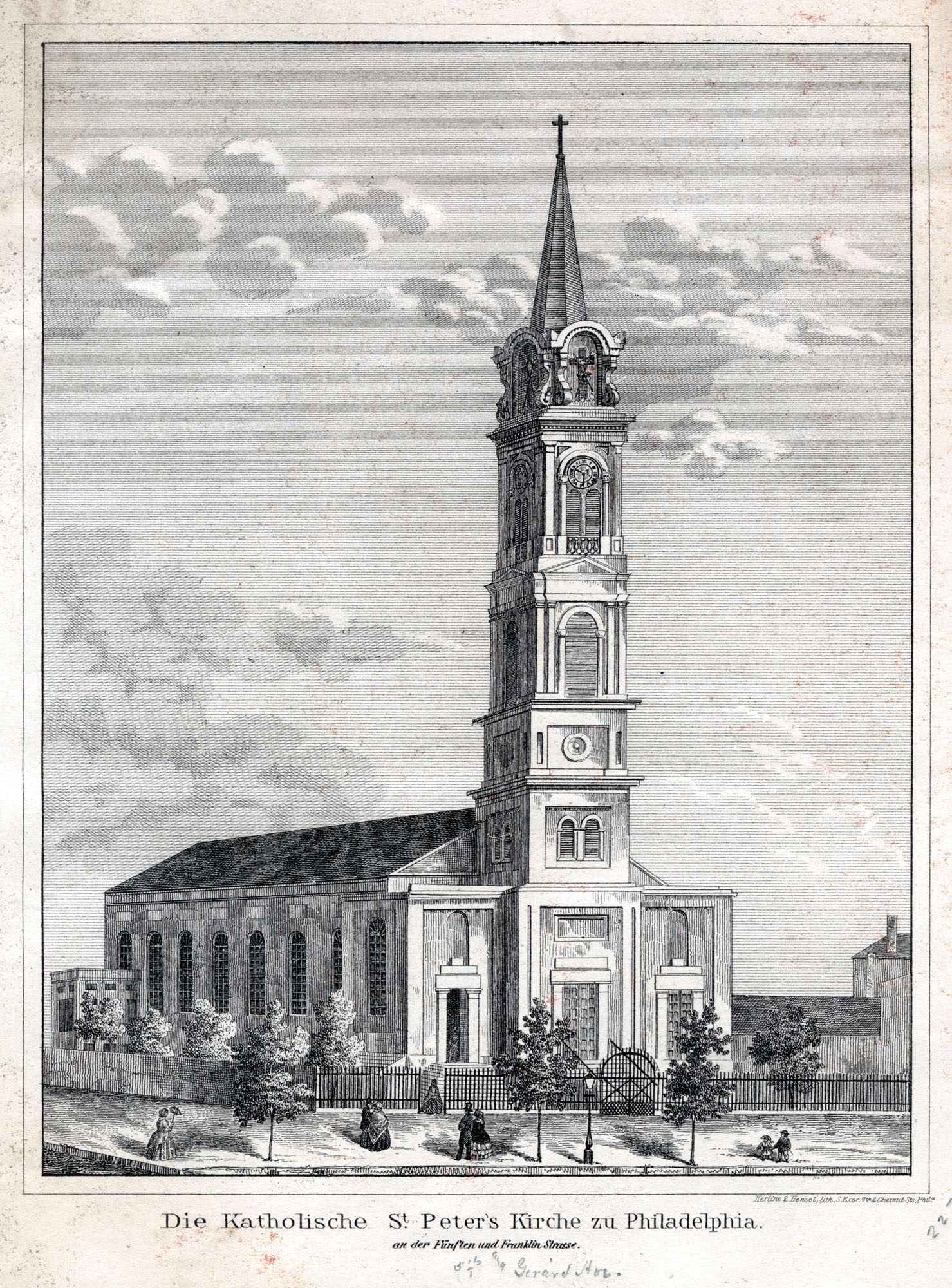
St. Peter the Apostle Church, Philadelphia

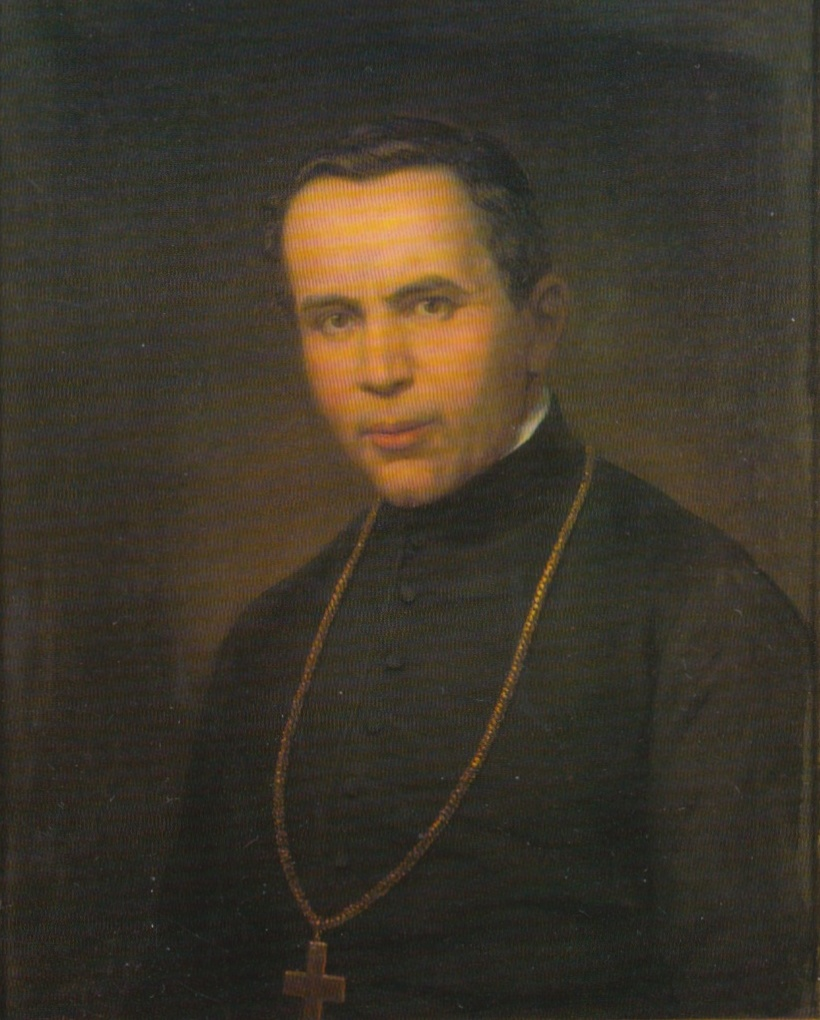
Bishop Neumann, Neumanneum, Prachatice

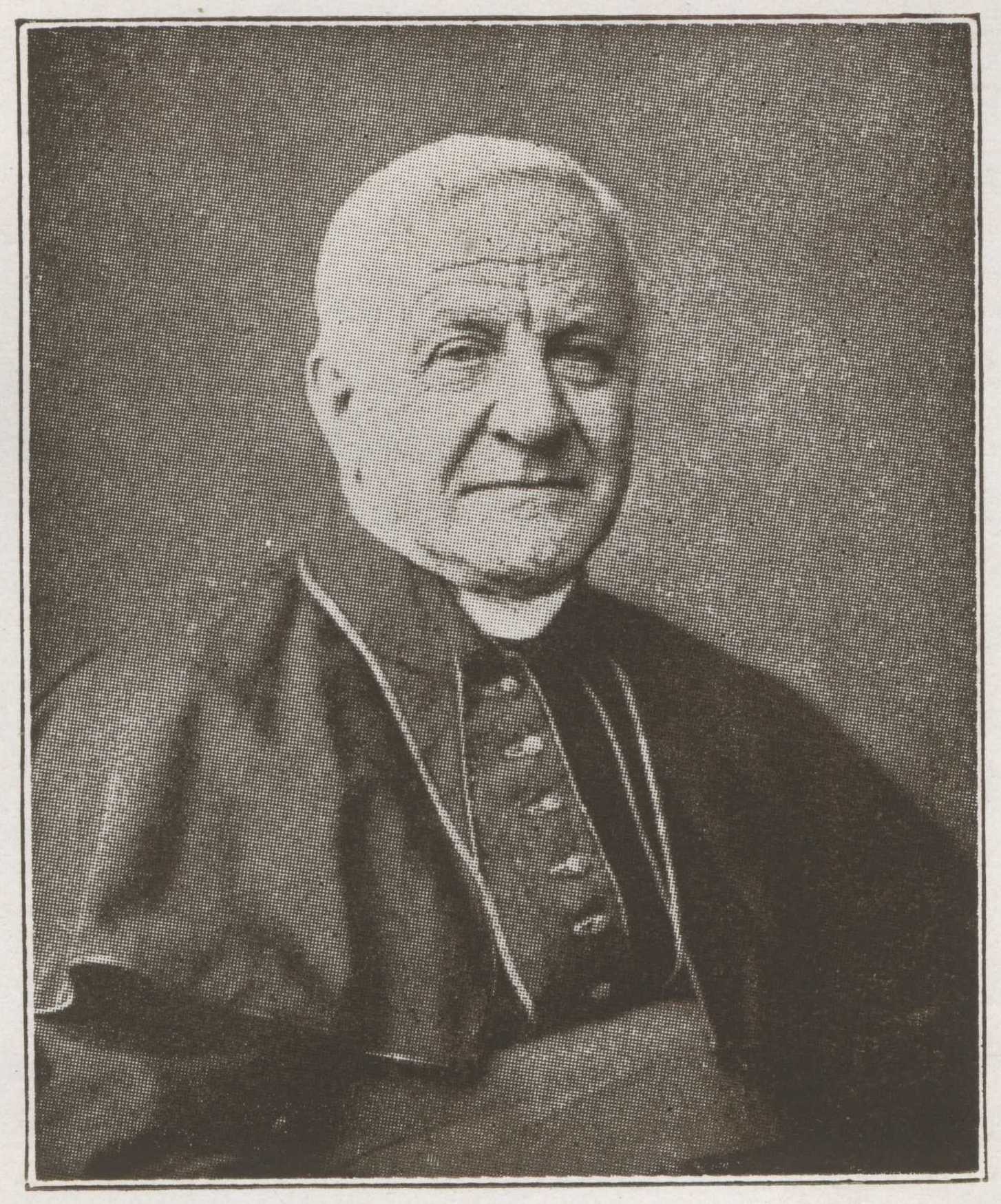
Archbishop Wood

On February 5, 1852, Pope Pius IX appointed Neumann as bishop of Philadelphia. Neumann did not look forward to the appointment, as it clashed with his dislike of receiving honors and praise.Kenrick presided over Neumann's consecration as bishop on March 28, 1852, with Bernard O'Reilly serving as co-consecrator. The consecration was held in Baltimore at St. Alphonsus Church.

Neumann's contemporaries in Philadelphia described him as very knowledgeable, but humble. He never criticized his priests or made negative comments about others. Neumann slept only a few hours a night, reportedly on the floor of his bedroom. His clothes were old and shabby; if gifted with new clothes, he immediately donated them to the poor. Neumann ate sparingly. He was welcoming to anyone who wanted to see him. His residence had few amenities, and he donated much of his cash to the needy. Neumann also enjoyed spending time with small children. When visiting St. Peter the Apostle Church in Philadelphia, established by the Redemptorists, he would venture into the kitchen to help wash dishes.

Philadelphia had a large, expanding Catholic immigrant population. The first wave were Germans fleeing the Napoleonic Wars of the early 1800s in Europe. They were followed by Irish escaping the Great Famine in Ireland of 1845 to 1852. Large groups of impoverished Italians and people from Eastern Europe and the Balkans started arriving. Catholic churches in the diocese became associated with immigrants from particular regions and language groups. They were known as national parishes. Their parishioners frequently did not speak English or needed help obtaining social services. They needed pastors who spoke their languages.

Soon after his consecration, Neumann had to deal with the problem of Holy Trinity Parish, a German national parish in Philadelphia. After years of court battles, Kenrick had closed the church in 1851 due to conflicts with its trustees over its ownership. Neumann continued the fight, suing the trustees. He also opened a new German parish, St. Alphonsus, in the city for the Holy Trinity parishioners. In 1854, Neumann won the court battle and gained control of the Holy Trinity property.

Unlike many German-speaking bishops, Neumann was fluent in Italian. He was also very invested in helping the new Italian immigrants. In September 1852, Neumann purchased a property to build the first church for Italian immigrants in Philadelphia. St. Mary Magdalen de Pazzi Church was dedicated in 1857; it was the first Italian national parish in the United States.

Neumann introduced the first diocesan-wide Forty Hours Devotion in the United States. A common practice in European dioceses, the devotion memorialized the 40 hours in which Christ's body lay in its tomb. Some people questioned the timing of this event, as the anti-Catholic Philadelphia Nativist Riots had occurred only nine years ago. Neumann related how he fell asleep at his desk one night while working late. When he awoke, he saw that his candle had charred some of his papers. He expressed his gratitude to God for saving him from a serious fire, then reported hearing these words

“As the flames are burning here without consuming or injuring the writing, so shall I pour out my grace in the Blessed Sacrament without prejudice to My honor. Fear no profanation, therefore: no longer to carry out your design for My glory.”

Neumann went ahead with the devotion at the Church of St. Philip Neri in May 1853 in honor of the church's patron. The Forty Hours Devotions were received with great enthusiasm by parishioners throughout the diocese To encourage savings and to support the financial needs of the Catholic community, Neumann in 1853 assisted in the founding of Beneficial Saving Fund Society, a mutual savings bank, Beneficial Bank, in 1853. Today it is part of WSFS Bank.

Neumann was committed to the Catholic education of immigrant children. At that time, public school systems in the major American cities were dominated by Protestants. Many public schools taught bible lessons using a Protestant bible. He became the first American bishop to organize a diocesan system of Catholic schools. Neumann established standard teaching plans and approved textbooks. His 1852 catechisms became standard texts.

Neumann in 1854 persuaded the School Sisters of Notre Dame de Namur to come to Philadelphia. They established the Academy of Notre Dame de Namur, a girls' school, in the city.In 1855, Neumann supported the foundation of the Sisters of St. Francis of Philadelphia.That same year, Neumann announced that all parishes in the diocese needed to deed their properties to the diocese within the next three months. He also set minimum salaries for pastors, required that parishes build rectories for them, and stipulated that lay persons could only speak during Mass with permission of the bishop. Neumann also tried to standardize all liturgical practices in the diocese, even stating how much wine should be poured when preparing the Eucharist.

At a diocesan synod in 1855, Neumann presented new rules to his clergy. He forbade all priests from visiting seaside resorts. Pastors could not leave their rectories or delegate their tasks to the assistant pastors. These priests could not leave the rectory for more than 24 hours without the pastor's permission.

Neumann was present in Rome at St. Peter's Basilica on December 8th, 1854, when Pius IX solemnly defined, ex cathedra, the dogma of the Immaculate Conception of the Blessed Virgin Mary. Neumann then visited Prachatice for a week in February 1855. Although he wanted a quiet visit, the citizens of Prachatice gave him a rousing welcome.

Neumann had previously created strict restrictions on his clergy, yet he was very reluctant to discipline those who broke the rules. This gave dissident priests room to publicly criticize his actions. Other priests felt that Neumann's leniency was creating disorder in the diocese. Kenrick, who had been a severe disciplinarian when bishop of Philadelphia, joined other clerics in complaining to the Vatican.

The Vatican in April 1857 appointed James Frederick Wood from the Archdiocese of Cincinnati as coadjutor bishop in Philadelphia to assist Neumann in administration and to discipline the clergy.In a later letter to Cardinal Alessandro Barnabò, Neumann said he thought that Pius IX was unhappy with his performance as bishop. Neumann said he would have gladly resigned in favor of Wood, who he felt was more qualified.

Neumann in 1858 attended the Ninth Provincial Council of Baltimore, along with the other American bishops. One of the topics at the council was the erection of new dioceses in the United States. Neumann let it be known that he would be happy to be appointed to a new diocese. However, as he stated in the letter to Barnabò, he would stay as bishop in Philadelphia as long as the pope wanted him there.In September 1859, Neumann presided at the laying of the cornerstone of the new Cathedral of Sts. Peter and Paul in Philadelphia.

=== Death ===
While doing errands in Philadelphia on January 5, 1860, Neumann collapsed; he died of a heart attack at age 48.During his term as bishop, 80 churches were constructed in the diocese, 30 parish schools were established, and he ordained 61 priests. At Neumann's funeral, Kenrick said this about him;

"His people appreciated his zeal and his learning, yet he possessed accomplishments of which the world knew not and virtues of which Heaven alone took comprehensive cognizance."

Neumann was buried, per his request, at St. Peter the Apostle Church beneath the undercroft floor directly below the high altar. Wood automatically succeeded Neumann as bishop of Philadelphia.

== Cause for canonization ==
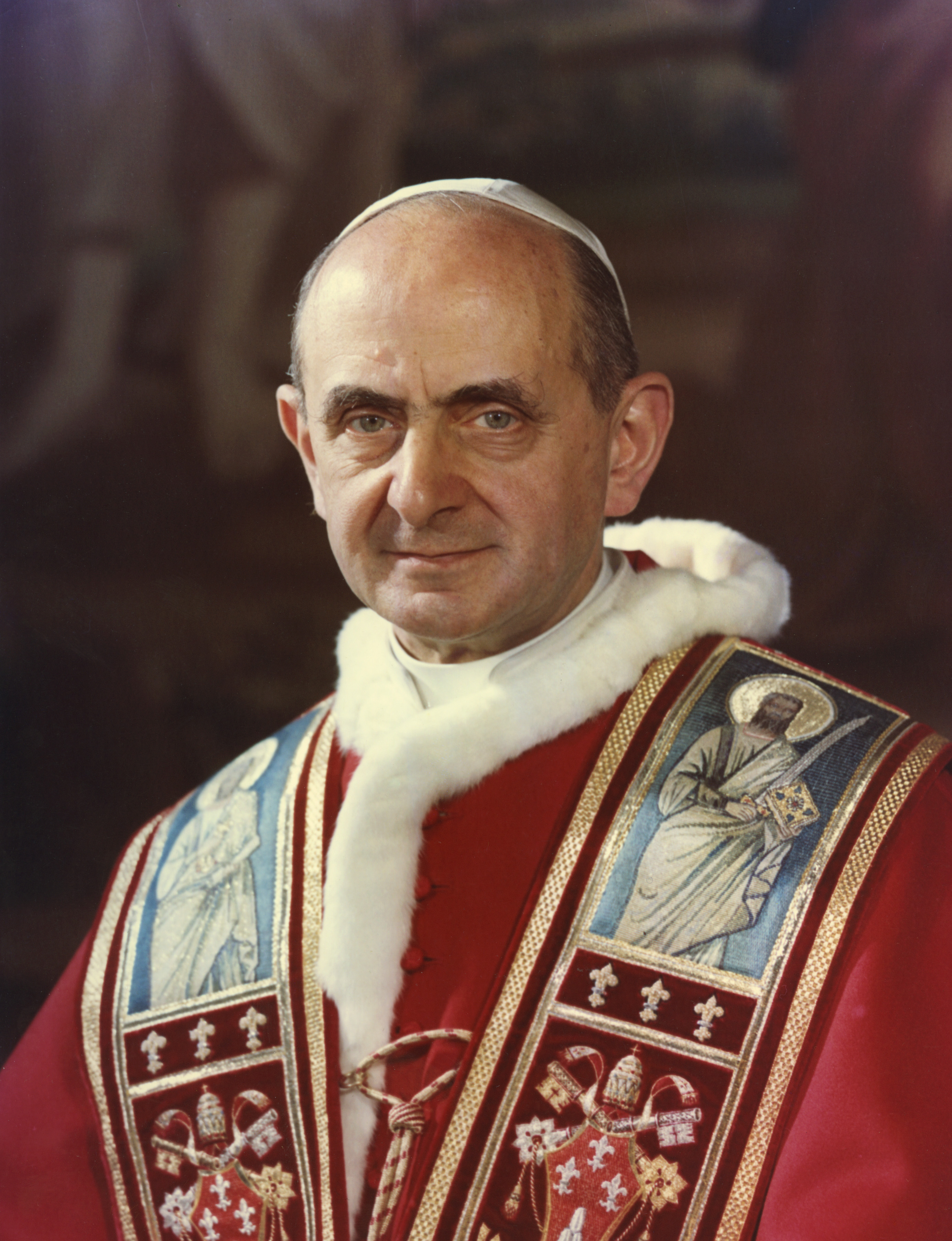
Pope Paul VI

=== Beatification ===
The cause for Neumann's beatification was initiated by the Archdiocese of Philadelphia and the Redemptorists in 1886. At that time, the Vatican required two verified miracles for beatification.The Vatican opened Neumann's cause in 1896, granting him the title of Servant of God. He was declared venerable by Pope Benedict XV in 1921.

Eleven-year-old Eva Benessi of Sassuolo in Northern Italy was diagnosed in 1923 with tuberculous peritonitis. The doctor said that her prognosis was terminal. Benessi's school then organized a prayer service to Neumann, and someone touched her stomach with a picture of him. She experienced a full recovery from the disease.

The managers of Neumann's cause in 1924 submitted the Benessi miracle along with a second one to the Vatican, but they rejected the second miracle due to insufficient evidence. Progress stalled on Neumann's cause.In 1949, 19-year-old J. Kent Lenahan Jr. was critically injured in a car crash in Wayne, Pennsylvania. Suffering from a fractured skull and extensive internal injuries, Lenahan was given no hope of survival. His parents brought a Neumann relic to the hospital and placed it on the bed of their comatose son. He soon awoke and eventually made a full recovery.

One hundred fifty-seven bishops in 1957 signed a petition to the Vatican requesting an apostolic benediction for Neumann, reviving his canonization cause. In March 1963, the Sacred Congregation of Rites at the Vatican accepted the Lenahan and Benessi cases as miracles.Neumann was beatified by Pope Paul VI during the Second Vatican Council in Rome on October 13, 1963. However, to achieve canonization, the Vatican needed to verify a third miracle.

=== Canonization ===
In December 1963, doctors told the parents of 14-year-old Michael Flanigan of Philadelphia that Ewings Sarcoma had metasticized throughout his body. The boy had no hope of recovery. The parents brought him a relic of Neumann and prayed to Neumann for an intercession on behalf of their son. Michael's condition started improving, and he was declared disease-free two years later. After investigating the Flanigan case for several years, the Dicastery for the Causes of Saints confirmed that it was a miracle.Paul VI canonized Neumann on June 19, 1977.

Neumann's feast days are January 5th for the American church and June 19th for the Czech church. After his canonization, the National Shrine of Saint John Neumann was constructed at the St. Peter the Apostle Church. Neumann's remains rest under the altar of the shrine within a glass-walled reliquary.

== Legacy ==
- The St. John Neumann Center was founded in 1965 as a skilled nursing facility in Philadelphia.
- In 1980, the Sisters of St. Francis of Philadelphia renamed Our Lady of the Angels College in Philadelphia as Neumann College. It became Neumann University in 2009.
- The Diocese of Manchester in 2017 established the St. John Neumann Education Trust for the advancement of Catholic education in New Hampshire in the United States.
- The Saint John Neumann Foundation was created in 2024 in Richmond, Virginia, to aid African-American Catholics.
- Neumannova Ulice (Neumann Street) is named after him in Prachatice.
- The St. John Neumann Philadelphia Guild of the Catholic Medical Association is an association of Catholic health care professionals.

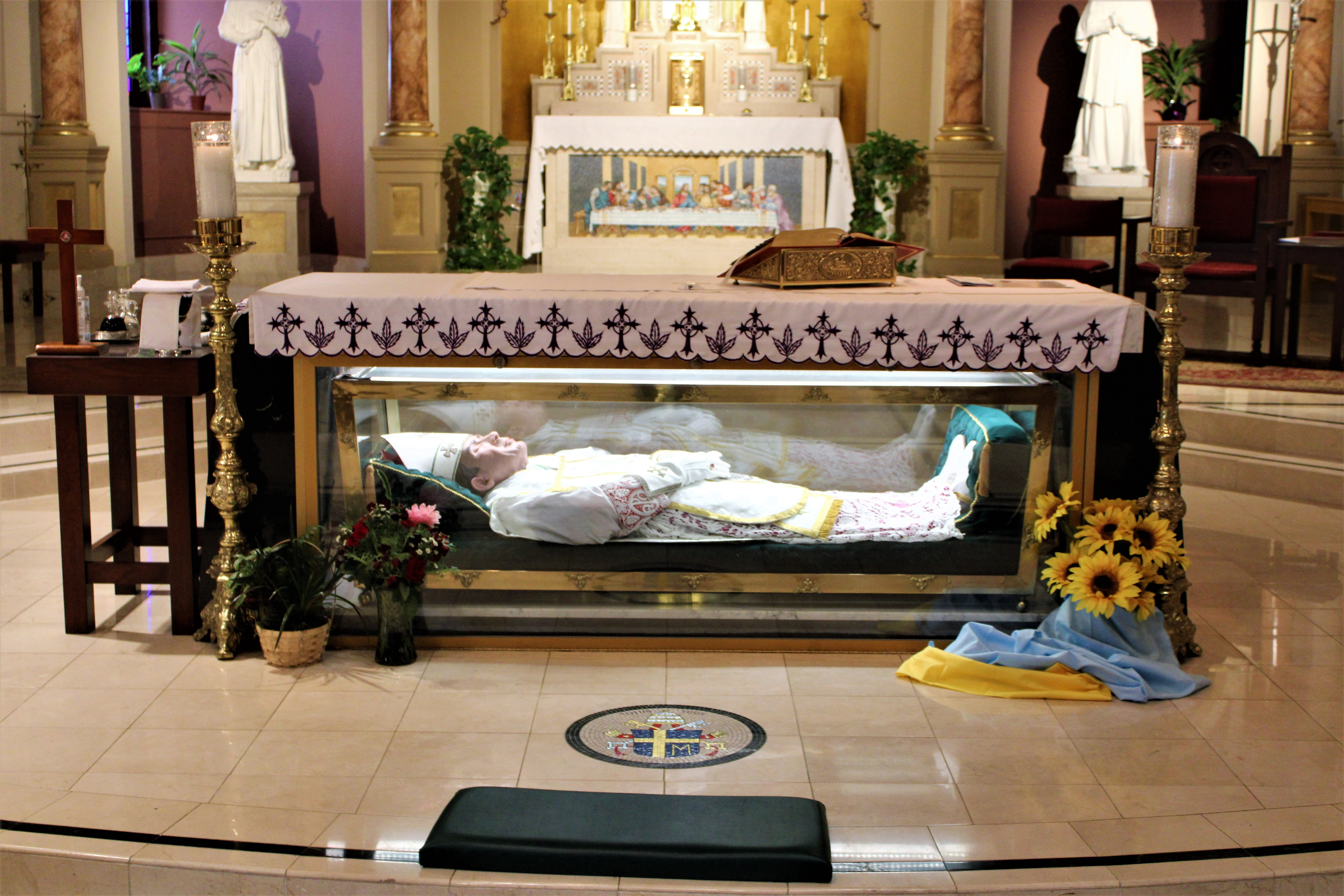
Neuman's remains, National Shrine of St. John Neumann

=== Shrines and chapels ===
- The St. John Neumann Shrine Museum is located at St. John the Baptist Church in Kenmore (North Bush)
- The National Shrine of St. John Neumann is located in Philadelphia.
- The Kostel Svatého Jakuba (Church of St. James) in Prachatice has a Neumann Chapel.

=== Schools ===
- Bishop Neumann Jr/Sr High School – Wahoo, Nebraska
- Neumann/Goretti Catholic High School – Philadelphia
- Saint John Neumann Catholic School – Knoxville, Tennessee
- Saint John Neumann Jr./Sr. High School – Scranton, Pennsylvania
- Saint John Neumann Regional Academy – Williamsport, Pennsylvania
- Saints Colman John Neumann School – Bryn Mawr, Pennsylvania
- St. John Neumann Academy – Blacksburg, Virginia
- St. John Neumann Catholic High School – Naples, Florida
- St. John Neumann Catholic School – Columbia, South Carolina
- St. John Neumann Catholic School – Lancaster, Pennsylvania
- St. John Neumann Catholic School – Maryville, Illinois
- St. John Neumann Catholic School – Miami, Florida
- St. John Neumann Catholic School – Pueblo, Colorado
- St. John Neumann Regional Catholic School – Lilburn, Georgia

== Jubilee year ==
In 2011, the Redemptorist Fathers celebrated the 200th anniversary of Neumann's birth. The closing Mass for the Neumann Year was held on June 23, 2012, in Philadelphia.

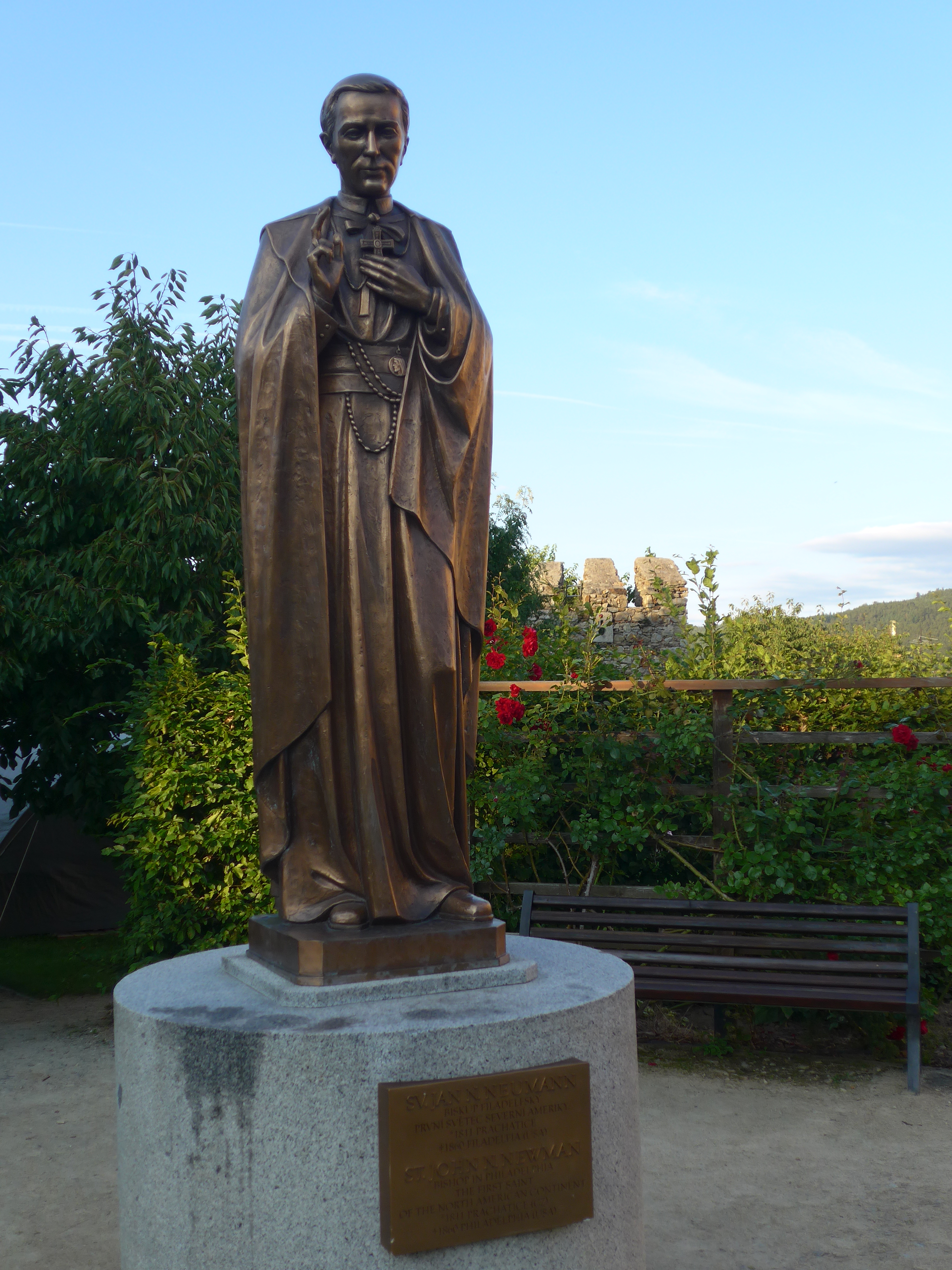
Neumann statue, Prachatitz

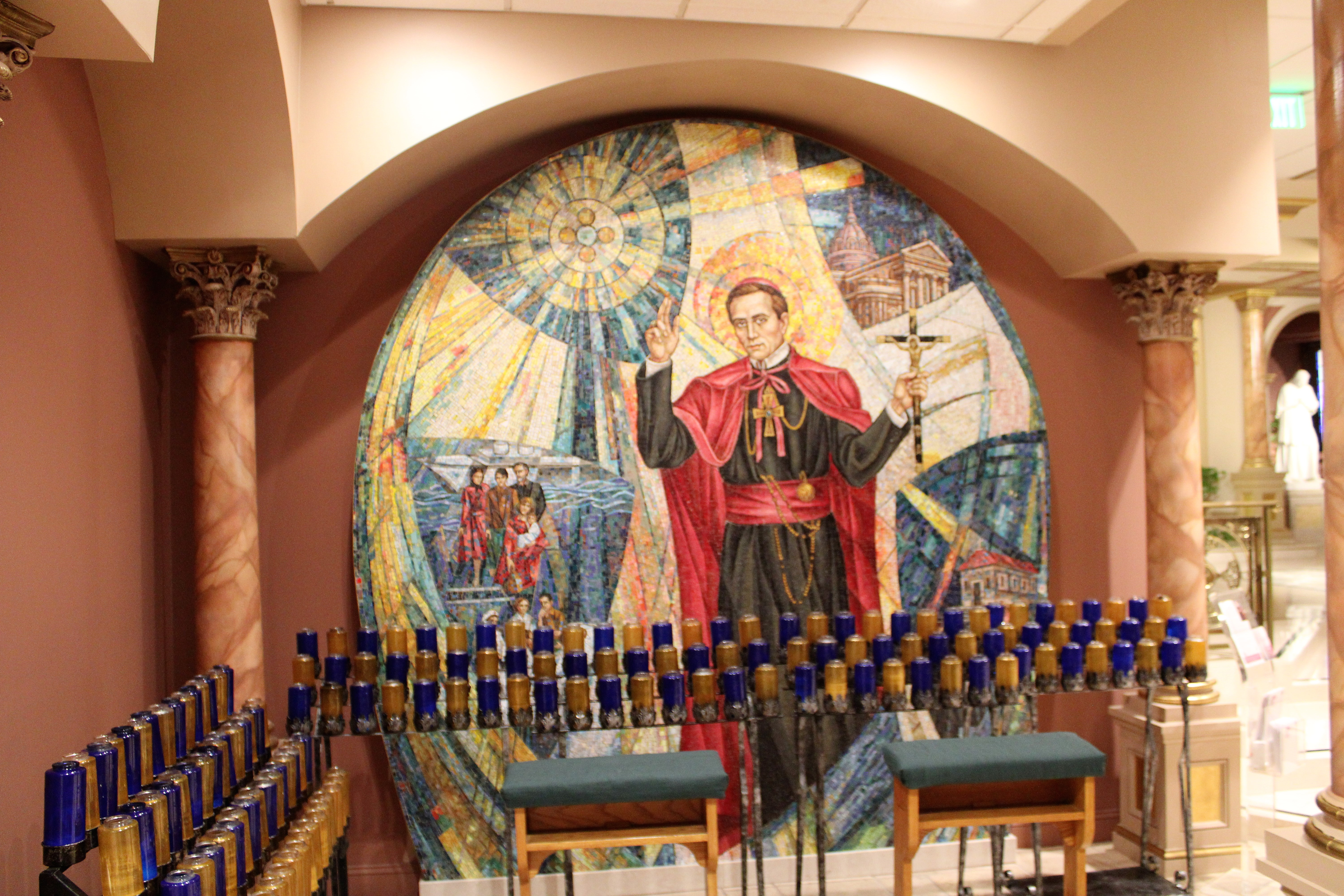
National Shrine of St. John Neumann

== Namesake schools ==
- St. John Neumann Academy (Blacksburg, Virginia)
- St. John Neumann Catholic School, Maryville, IL
- Neumann Preparatory School (Wayne, New Jersey)
- Bishop Neumann Catholic High School in Wahoo, Nebraska
- Neumann Classical School
- Saint John Neumann High School (Pennsylvania)
- St. John Neumann High School (Naples, Florida)
- Neumann University
- Biskupské gymnázium Jana Nepomuka Neumanna (Budweis – Czech Republic)
- Saint John Neumann Catholic School (Knoxville, Tennessee)
- Saint John Neumann Catholic School (Pueblo, Colorado)
- Saint John Neumann Regional Academy (Williamsport, Pennsylvania)
- St. John Neumann Regional Catholic School (Lilburn, Georgia)
- Bishop Neumann High School (Williamsville, New York- Renamed Ss. Peter and Paul School)
- St. John Neumann (Columbia, SC) Grades 3K-6th

== See also ==
- Saint John Neumann, patron saint archive
- Demetrius Augustine Gallitzin, Apostle of the Alleghenies
- John Nepomucene, John Neumann's namesake

== Sources ==
- Curley, Michael (1952). Venerable John Neumann, C.SS.R.: Fourth Bishop of Philadelphia. Washington, D.C.: Catholic University of America Press.
- Svoboda, Rudolf. John Nepomucene Neumann in Budweis 1823–1833. Study at Gymnasium, Institute of Philosophy and Episcopal Priestly Seminary, Spicilegium Historicum Congregationis SSmi Redemptoris 71, 1/2023, 67–117.
- Svoboda, Rudolf. Questions about the Priestly and Missionary Vocation and the Ordination of John Nepomucene Neumann, The Catholic Historical Review, vol. 109 no. 3/2023, 515–540.
- Svoboda, Rudolf. Ordinary Informative Process on John Nepomucene Neumann in the Diocese of Budweis in 1886–1888 and Examination of His Written Estate in 1891, Kościół i Prawo 11(24), 2/2022, 267–287.
- Svoboda, Rudolf. Apostolic Process on John Nepomucene Neumann in the Diocese of Budweis 1897–1901, Kościół i Prawo 12 (25), 1/2023, 223–246.

Catholic Church titles
Preceded by Francis Kenrick	Bishop of Philadelphia; 1852–1860	Succeeded by James Frederick Wood
