= WSFS =

WSFS may refer to:

- WSFS (AM), a radio station (950 AM) licensed to Chicago, Illinois, United States
- World Science Fiction Society, the organization associated with the World Science Fiction Convention
- WSFS Bank, the common name for Wilmington Savings Fund Society, the primary subsidiary of WSFS Financial Corporation
- WQAM-FM, a radio station (104.3 FM) licensed to Miramar, Florida, United States, serving the Miami metropolitan area, which used the call sign WSFS from 2015 to 2025
