= 1818 Market Street =

40-story skyscraper in downtown Philadelphia, Pennsylvania, United States

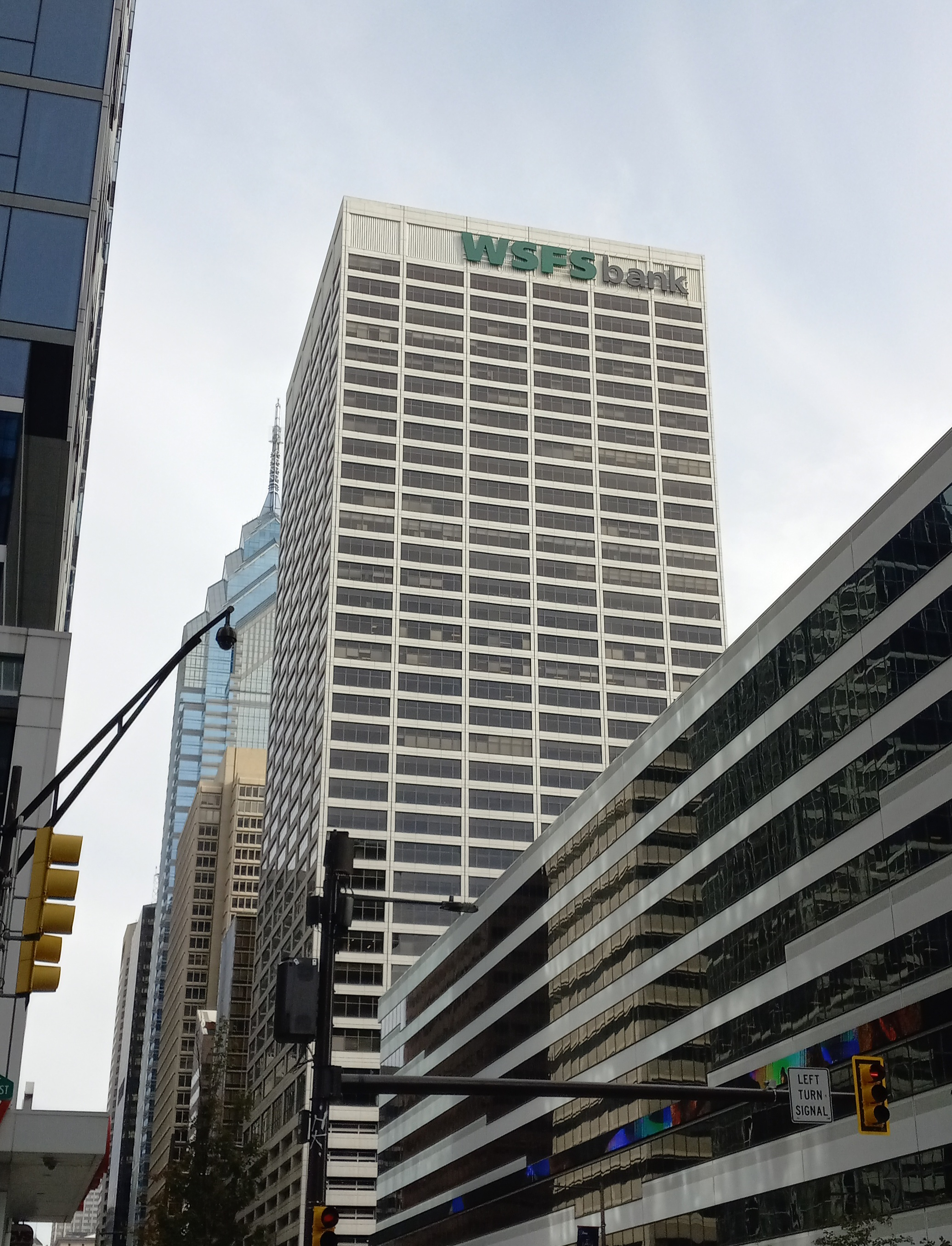
- 1818 Market Street in Philadelphia

- Location within Philadelphia Location within Pennsylvania Location within the United States
- Former names: Beneficial Bank Place
- Alternative names: WSFS Bank Place

General information
- Status: Completed
- Type: Office
- Location: 1818 Market Street, Philadelphia, Pennsylvania, U.S.
- Opening: 1974
- Cost: US$50,000,000
- Owner: Shorenstein Properties

Height
- Roof: 500 ft (152 m)

Technical details
- Floor count: 40
- Floor area: 981,743 sq ft (91,206.9 m^{2})

Design and construction
- Architect: EwingCole (formerly Ewing Cole Cherry Brott)
- Developer: Walters Associates

Website
- www.1818marketstreet.com

1818 Market Street (also known as 1818 WSFS Bank Place) is a 40-story skyscraper in downtown Philadelphia, Pennsylvania. The building was designed by the firm Ewing Cole Cherry Brott (now EwingCole). Construction began on the property in 1972.

The developer, Walters Associates, which also developed the Holiday Inn at 1800 Market (now the Sonesta Philadelphia), planned a construction budget of $50 million for the property. It was the tallest building erected in Philadelphia between the completion of City Hall in 1901 and the completion of One Liberty Place in 1987, during the period of the "gentlemen's agreement", the observation of an unofficial height restriction of the top of the hat of the statue of William Penn atop City Hall that stood for 86 years. The building is the eleventh-tallest in Philadelphia.

The building contains over 981,000 square feet (91,100 m^{2}) of office space over 37 floors with six levels of parking. Its major tenants include ABN Amro, the American College of Radiology, WSFS Bank, Booz Allen Hamilton, eResearch Technology, Five Below, Merrill Lynch, Mitchell & Titus, Metrocorp, Northwestern Mutual, Swiss Re, and STV Incorporated.

The building, currently the tallest reinforced-concrete structure in the city, underwent major renovations in 2003, more than a decade after its facade was treated resulting in its signature white color. In May 2015, the building was purchased by Shorenstein Properties for $184.8 million. In August 2019, WSFS Bank added their logo to the top of the building after completion of their acquisition and rebranding of Beneficial Bank, which had previously been headquartered in the building.

== See also ==
- List of tallest buildings in Philadelphia
- Tallest buildings in the United States
- List of skyscrapers
- World's tallest structures
