= Mitchell & Titus =

Mitchell & Titus, LLP
- Company type: Limited Liability Partnership
- Industry: Professional services
- Founded: 1974
- Headquarters: New York City, New York
- Area served: United States; New York City, NY; Rutherford, NJ; Philadelphia, PA; Baltimore, MD; Washington, D.C. Chicago, IL
- Key people: Bert N. Mitchell (Founder); Anthony S. Kendall (CEO); Kwabina Appiah (former COO)
- Services: Assurance; Tax; Advisory
- Number of employees: 95
- Website: mitchelltitus.com

Mitchell & Titus, LLP is an independent member firm of BDO Alliance USA and the largest accounting firm in the United States owned by a minority social group. Headquartered in New York City, the company provides professional services in assurance, tax, and advisory to Fortune 1000 companies, entrepreneurial enterprises, not-for-profit organizations, financial services firms, government entities, and high-net-worth individuals. Mitchell & Titus maintains six offices across six states in New York, New Jersey, Pennsylvania, Maryland, District of Columbia, and Illinois.

== History ==
=== Early business ===
Bert N. Mitchell and Robert Titus formed a partnership in 1974, establishing Mitchell & Titus, LLP. In the late 1970s, the firm targeted not-for-profit, community-based organizations receiving federal grants from the Great Society programs. Among the first large not-for-profit clients were the Economic Commission of Nassau County (New York), and Recruitment and Training, Inc. of the A. Philip Randolph Institute.

In 1978, Mitchell & Titus broke new ground by pioneering joint venture projects with the then "Big Eight" accounting firms. The firm entered a joint venture agreement with KPMG Peat Marwick to conduct New York City's first independent audit. The firm also opened its Washington, D.C. office in 1979 to be better positioned for government contracts. Joint ventures and minority participation contracts attributed to the firm's growth throughout the late 1980s, during the time when the "Big Eight" became the "Big Six".

=== Relationship with larger accounting networks ===
The relationship with Ernst & Young began in the early 1980s with a joint venture relationship, which included the joint audit of the City of New York for many years. In 1986, Mitchell & Titus established a management consulting division to attract commercial clients and take part in the growing consulting industry.

Mitchell & Titus joined Ernst & Young Global Limited as a member firm in 2006; its membership ended effective October 30, 2015.

On March 9, 2017, Mitchell Titus joined the BDO Alliance USA, a nationwide association of independently owned local and regional accounting, consulting and service firms under the BDO USA, LLP umbrella.

=== Growth through acquisition ===
Mitchell & Titus enacted an acquisition strategy to grow their client base and presence around the country.

1984 – Acquired New York–based accounting firm Stewart, Benjamin and Brown.
1986 – Acquired Philadelphia-based Leevy, Redcross & Co.
2005 – Acquired New Jersey–based Frye, Williams, & Co.
2009 – Acquired Chicago-based Hill Taylor LLC.
2018 – Acquired Chicago-based Washington, Pittman & McKeever, LLC.

Mitchell & Titus offices
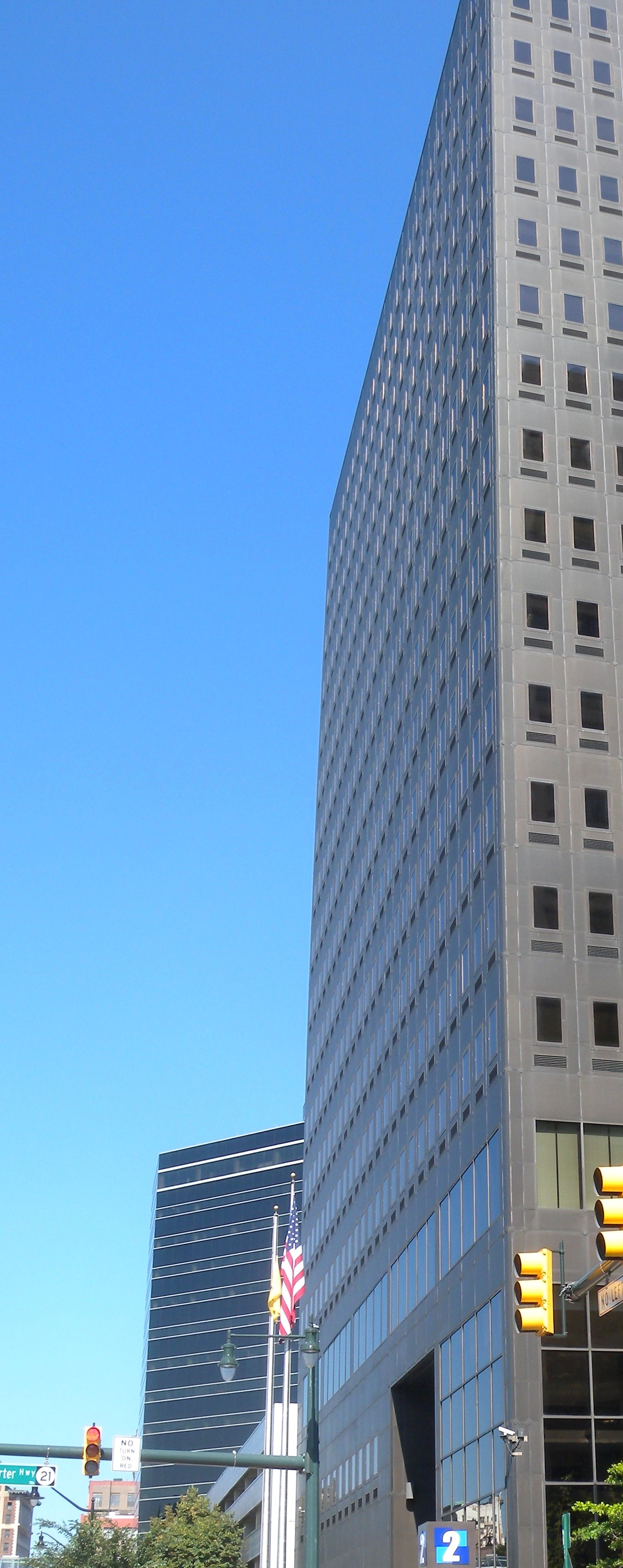
One Gateway Center, Newark, New Jersey

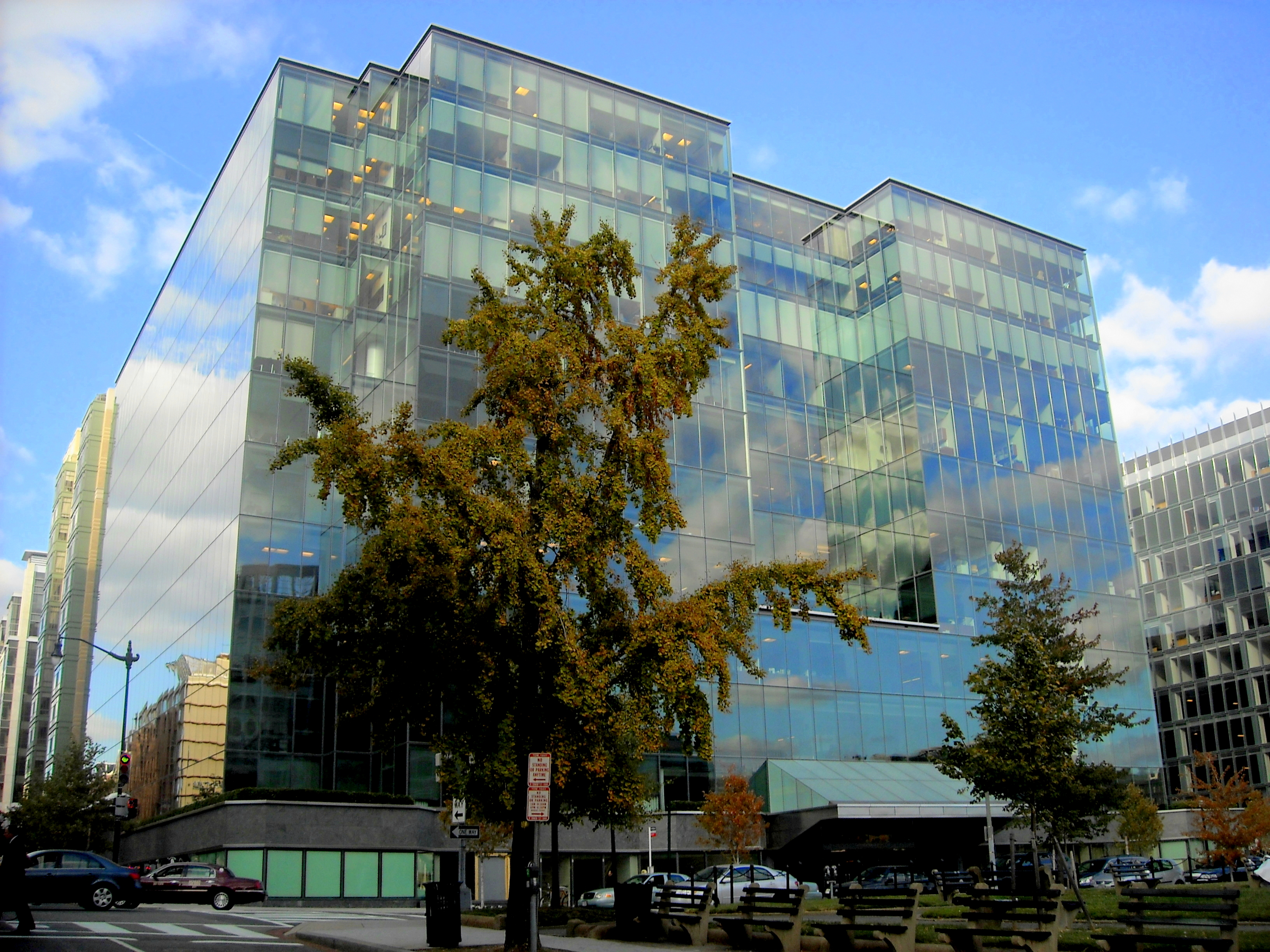
1101 New York Avenue, Washington D.C.

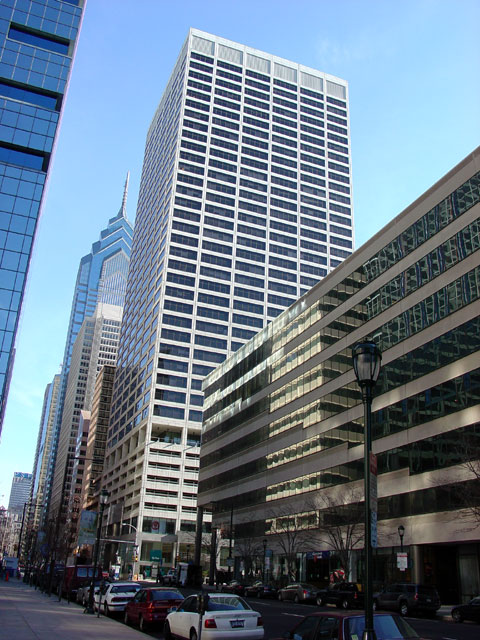
1818 Market Street, Philadelphia, Pennsylvania

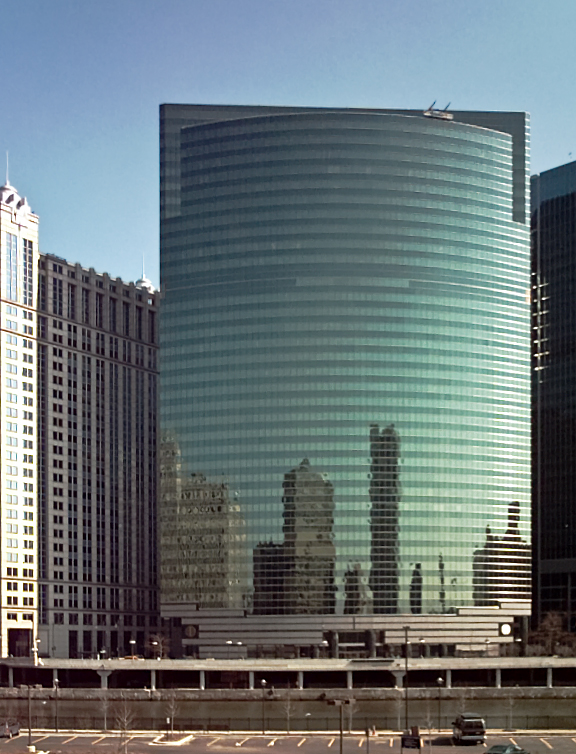
333 West Wacker, Chicago, Illinois
