= Wilmington Savings Fund Society Building =

- Wilmington Savings Fund Society
- U.S. National Register of Historic Places
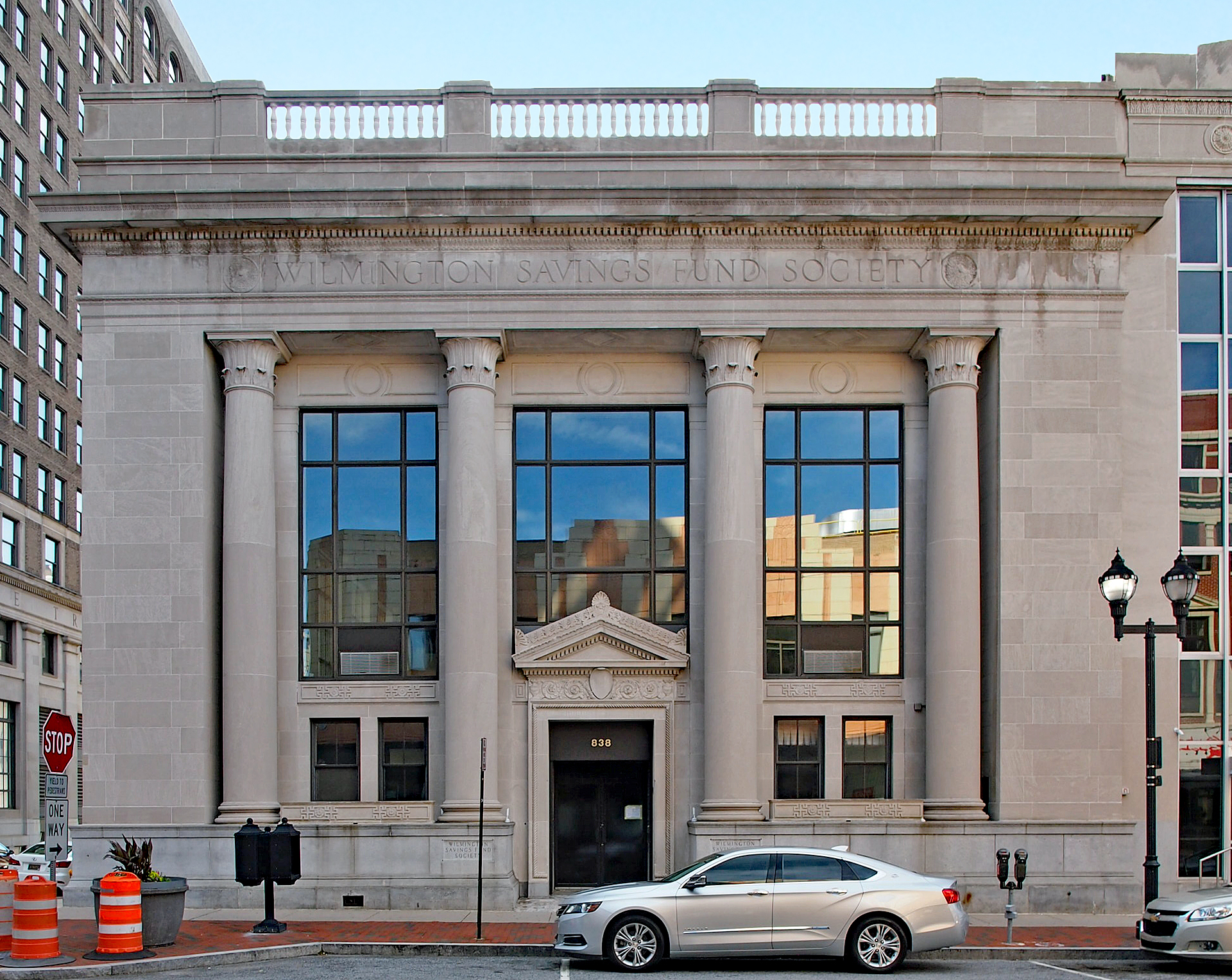
- The Wilmington Savings Fund Society Building from the northwest

- Location within Delaware Location within the United States
- Location: 838 N. Market Street, Wilmington, Delaware
- Coordinates: 39°44′40″N 75°32′54″W
- Area: 0.3 acres (0.12 ha)
- Built: 1920
- Architect: Hoggson Brothers; Clark, George
- Architectural style: Neoclassical
- MPS: Market Street MRA
- NRHP reference No.: 85000158
- Added to NRHP: January 30, 1985

The Wilmington Savings Fund Society Building is a historic bank building at 838 North Market Street in Wilmington, Delaware, United States. The three-story masonry structure was built in 1920, replacing an earlier building constructed by the Wilmington Savings Fund Society in 1886, and was designed by the New York City Hoggson Brothers firm. It is a stately expression of the Classical Revival, with massive Egyptian columns supporting porticos on three sides.

Prior to WSFS Bank moving to its current headquarters on Delaware Avenue, the building's main entry on North Market Street featured an ornate dentillated pediment. The lobby featured a mural by N. C. Wyeth, added in 1932. The building was listed on the National Register of Historic Places in 1985.

In 2015, construction began to turn the building into apartments aimed at housing teachers from the area's many public and charter schools.

== See also ==
- National Register of Historic Places listings in Wilmington, Delaware
