= Beneficial Bank =

American bank acquired by WSFS

- Company type: Public
- Traded as: Formerly Nasdaq: BNCL; Russell 2000 Component
- Industry: Finance
- Founded: 1853
- Defunct: 2019
- Fate: Acquired by WSFS Bank
- Headquarters: Philadelphia, Pennsylvania, U.S.
- Key people: Gerard P. Cuddy, president and CEO
- Products: Financial services
- Total assets: US $4.7 billion
- Number of employees: 950+
- Website: thebeneficial.com^{Archived}

Beneficial Mutual Bancorp, Inc. operated Beneficial Bank, a full-service bank whose assets totaled approximately $5 billion upon its acquisition by WSFS in 2019. Founded in 1853, Beneficial was the oldest and largest bank headquartered in Philadelphia, with more than 58 locations throughout Pennsylvania and South Jersey. The bank provided financial services including personal and business banking, mortgages and loans, wealth management, business and insurance services.

== History ==
Beneficial Bank's foundation was built on Saint John Neumann's vision of providing a safe, secure place for Philadelphia's immigrants to deposit their savings. Members of the Board of Managers of St. Joseph's Hospital met in 1853 to discuss starting a saving fund society. That same year, the Beneficial Saving Fund Society was incorporated. In 1854, Beneficial Bank began operations.

The bank celebrated its 160th anniversary in 2013. In 2005, Beneficial completed its acquisition of the insurance firm Paul Hertel & Co., through a subsidiary of the bank, Beneficial Insurances, LLC.

Beneficial had made other major acquisitions in recent years, including the FMS Financial Corporation (the parent company of Farmers & Mechanics Bank) and St. Edmond's Federal Savings Bank. Its last acquisition was the 2015 purchase of Conestoga Bank of Chester Springs, Pennsylvania.

Beneficial completed its conversion to a publicly traded company in early 2015, and was advised by Sandler O'Neill and Partners.

In 2014, Beneficial moved its headquarters to 1818 Market Street in Philadelphia, at which point the building was renamed 1818 Beneficial Bank Place.

WSFS and Beneficial announced that WSFS would acquire Beneficial, with the deal expected to close in early 2019. The deal ultimately closed March 1, 2019. Beneficial offices as well as some WSFS offices were consolidated and/or rebranded under the WSFS name on August 26.
