= National Shrine of Saint John Neumann =

Roman Catholic church in Philadelphia, Pennsylvania

Coordinates: 39.969203°N 75.14505°W

- St. Peter the Apostle Church
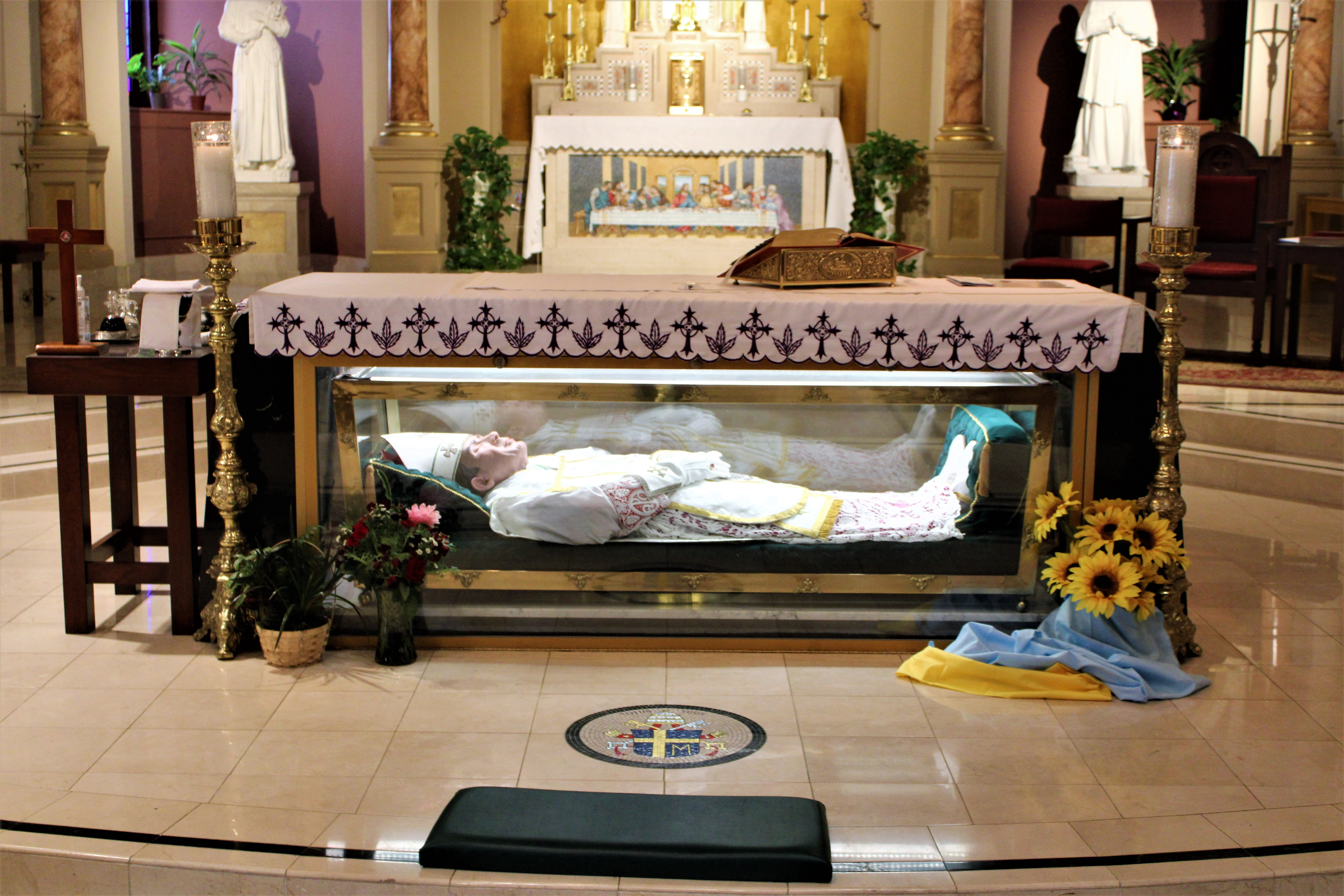
- National Shrine of Saint John Neumann
- Location: 1019 N. Fifth St. Philadelphia, Pennsylvania; United States
- Denomination: Catholic Church
- Website: www.stjohnneumann.org

History
- Status: National Shrine/Parish church
- Founded: 1842 (St. Peter the Apostle Parish)
- Founder(s): Rev. Louis Cartuyvels, C.Ss.R.
- Dedicated: February 14,1847

Architecture
- Architect: Joseph Koecker
- Style: Romanesque Revival
- Completed: 1847, 1897 (rebuilt)

Specifications
- Materials: Port Deposit granite

Administration
- Archdiocese: Philadelphia

Clergy
- Priest: Congregation of the Most Holy Redeemer

The National Shrine of St. John Neumann is a Catholic national shrine dedicated to John Neumann, the fourth Bishop of Philadelphia and the first American male to be canonized. The shrine is located in the lower church of St. Peter the Apostle Church at 1019 North 5th Street, in Philadelphia, Pennsylvania, in the United States. The construction of the main church began in 1843.

Adjoining the lower church is a small museum, which displays exhibits relating to the life of the saint. The National Shrine of St. John Neumann and St. Peter's Church are under the care of the Redemptorists, the religious community of which St. John Neumann was a member.

== History ==
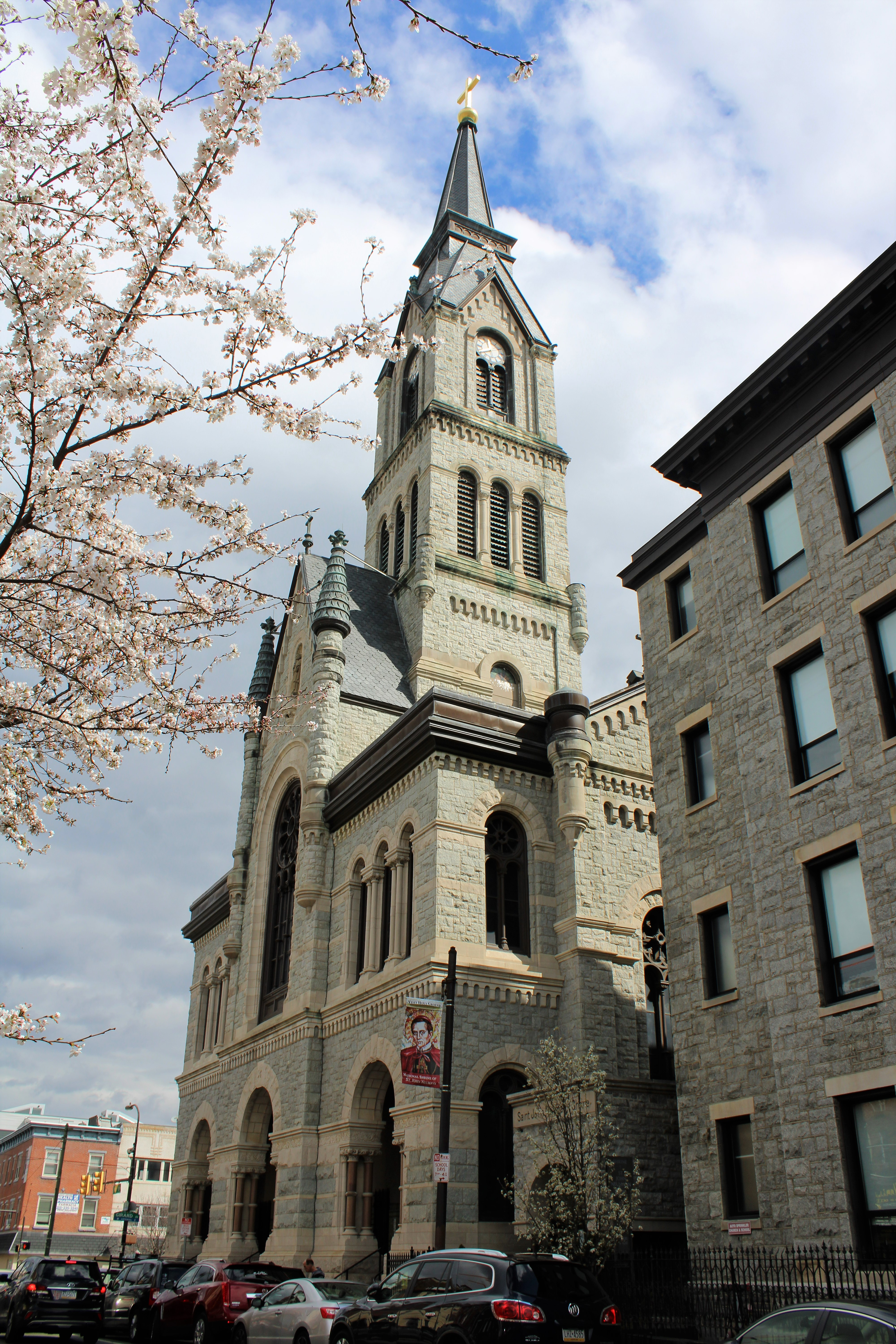
St. Peter the Apostle Church

When Bishop Neumann died suddenly in 1860 he was buried, as requested, at St. Peter's Church beneath the undercroft floor directly below the high altar.

Pope Paul VI beatified Neumann during the Second Vatican Council and declared him a saint in 1977. The undercroft at St. Peter the Apostle Church underwent several renovations after Neumann's initial interment. The space served for years as the lower church of St. Peter the Apostle parish and eventually became the National Shrine of Saint John Neumann after his canonization. The body of the saint lies in a glass-enclosed reliquary under the main altar. It is dressed in the episcopal vestments with a mask covering the face.

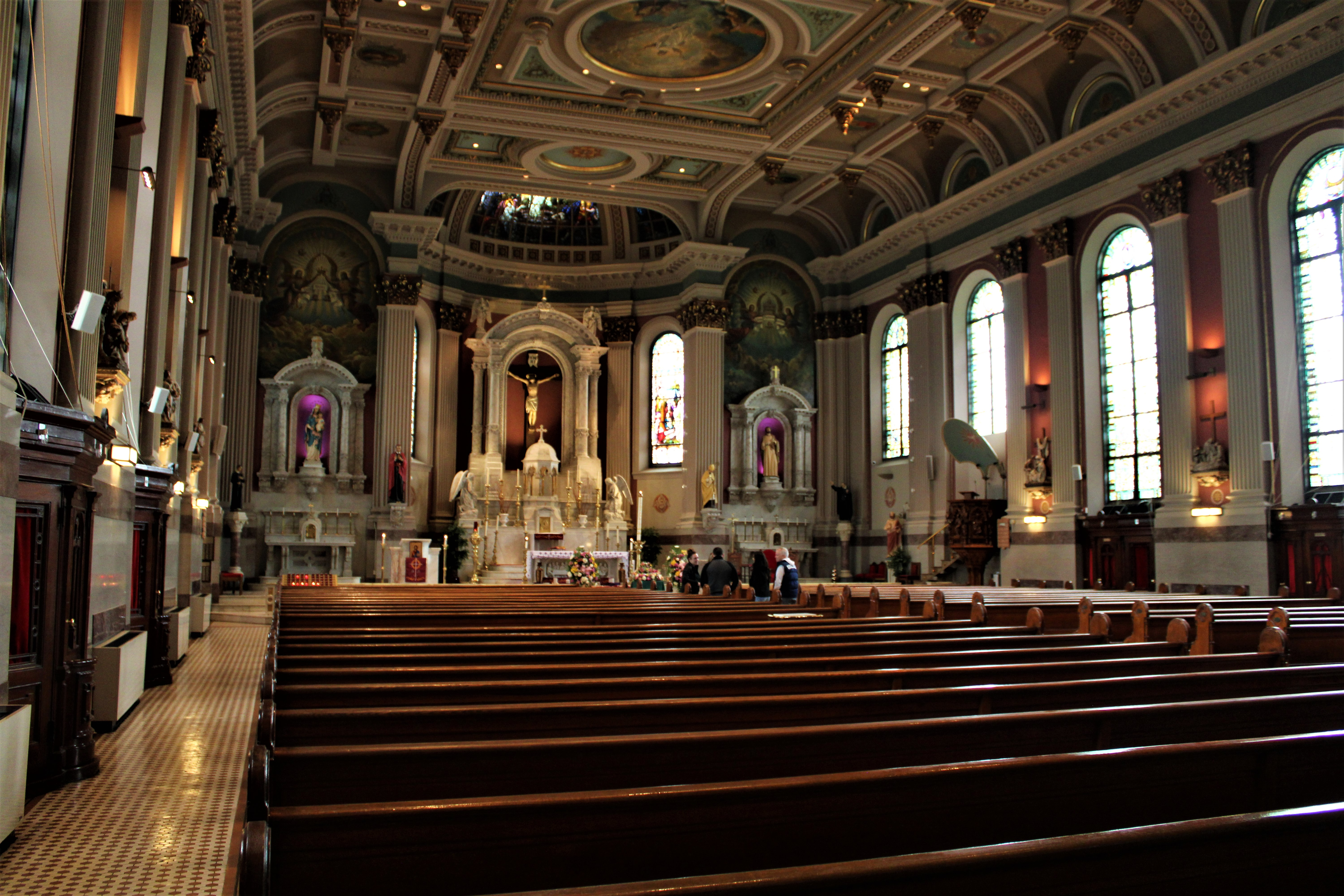
Interior of the Upper church

The saint's body has undergone multiple vestment changes since it was first displayed at the time of his beatification. In 1989, during the course of a major renovation of the shrine, the body of the saint was clothed in a set of modern vestments cut in the Gothic style. On December 27, 2007, the body received a new mask and was clad with a set of traditional Roman vestments, including a laced alb, stole, maniple, episcopal gloves, and traditional Roman fiddleback chasuble. The Cardinal Archbishop of Philadelphia, Justin Francis Rigali, was present to assist with the vesting.

== Fire ==
Fire broke out in the lower church on May 13, 2009. The pulpit, located near the body, was reduced to ashes, but the body of the saint was left intact. The plaster covering over the face did not show any signs of heat. The pastor, Fr. Kevin Moley, C.Ss.R., called it miraculous.

Three stained-glass windows at the Shrine were damaged by vandalism in the early morning hours of February 19, 2024.

== See also ==
- List of shrines § United States
- Top Catholic pilgrimage destinations in the US
- Archdiocese of Philadelphia
