= WSFS Bank =

American financial services corporation

Wilmington Savings Fund Society
- Type: Public
- Traded as: Nasdaq: WSFS; S&P 600 component; Russell 2000 component
- Industry: Financial services
- Founded: February 18, 1832; 194 years ago
- Headquarters: Wilmington, Delaware, U.S.
- Area served: Florida; Delaware; New Jersey; Nevada; Pennsylvania; Virginia
- Key people: Rodger Levenson, Chairman, President and CEO; Willard Hall, Founder and First President
- Products: Banking, Wealth Management
- Number of employees: 2,309 (December 31, 2024)
- Website: wsfsbank.com

WSFS Financial Corporation is a financial services company. Its primary subsidiary, WSFS Bank, a federal savings bank, is the largest and longest-standing locally managed bank and wealth management franchise headquartered in Delaware and the Philadelphia metropolitan area. WSFS operates from 115 offices, 88 of which are banking offices, located in Pennsylvania (57), Delaware (39), New Jersey (14), Florida (2), Virginia (1), and Nevada (1) and provides comprehensive financial services including commercial banking, retail banking, treasury management and trust and wealth management with 2,309 employees.

Serving the Greater Delaware Valley since 1832, WSFS Bank is one of the ten oldest banks in the United States continuously operating under the same name.

== History ==
=== Early history ===
Wilmington Savings Fund Society was chartered as a Delaware thrift in 1832 by a group of Wilmington community leaders and businessmen. The bank was formed for the working citizens of Wilmington to encourage thrift, to safeguard and increase their savings in a community bank. The bank's first day of business was February 18, 1832, in a rented room "one door below" Town Hall on Market Street. The bank grew steadily through the 19th century, and moved locations twice more before constructing their own building at 838 N. Market Street in 1886. That building stood until 1920, when its replacement was constructed on the same lot and opened for business. In 1932 the building received its landmark mural, Apotheosis of the Family by N. C. Wyeth. The mural, 60'x19', was commissioned by Frederick Stone to celebrate the bank's 100th anniversary, and a smaller version of this mural still hangs in the bank's current headquarters at 500 Delaware Avenue in Wilmington.

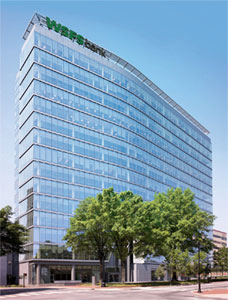
WSFS Bank Center at 500 Delaware Avenue, Wilmington, DE

=== 1950s to early 1990s ===
WSFS' growth continued in the 1950s and 60s, and was the first bank in the United States to issue debit cards in the late 1960s. By the 1980s, WSFS had expanded from northern New Castle County into Kent and Sussex counties, and went public in 1986 on the NASDAQ market. By the early 1990s the bank was in poor financial shape, and was near bankruptcy. The Board of Directors hired Marvin "Skip" Schoenhals in 1990, and began a dramatic turnaround. Nearly all of the lower Delaware branches were sold to Wilmington Trust, and lending practices and credit quality were administered more closely.

=== Mid-1990s to 2007 ===
Over time, the bank gradually strengthened and was reintroduced to Kent County and Sussex County. In 1995, WSFS Bank opened its first branch in Kent County since the 1991 closings in the Dover Metro Supermarket. The first new branch in Sussex County since the closings opened in Rehoboth Beach in July 2003 and moved to its current location in June 2004. New branch locations have since opened in Camden, Canterbury, Harrington, Lewes, Long Neck, Milford, Millsboro, Ocean View, Seaford, Selbyville, Smyrna, West Dover and Wyoming.

WSFS Bank has the largest ATM network in Delaware and one of the largest branded ATM networks in the Greater Delaware Valley. The bank has ATMs located in all Delaware Walgreens pharmacies. Fee free ATMs are also located in most Grotto Pizza locations, Walmart stores, Buffalo Wild Wings, and Food Lion locations. There are over 600 WSFS-branded ATMs in Delaware, Maryland, Pennsylvania and New Jersey.

In 2007, WSFS Bank moved its corporate headquarters from 838 N. Market Street, Wilmington, Delaware, where it had resided since 1885, to 500 Delaware Avenue. The 838 Market Street location is listed on the United States National Register of Historic Places. At the time it was built, the new location was the first multi-tenant building to be constructed in Wilmington since the late 1980s.

=== 2008 to present ===
WSFS steered through the Great Recession and came out stronger than before. In 2010, WSFS began to expand further into southeastern Pennsylvania with the relocation of its Glen Mills branch. WSFS has since opened additional locations in Edgmont, Kennett Square, Media and West Chester, and expanded further in southeastern Pennsylvania through strategic acquisitions, including Alliance Bank in April 2015, Penn Liberty Bank in November 2015, and Philadelphia-based Beneficial Bank in March 2019. Additionally, the WSFS Bank brand was introduced in New Jersey in August 2019 when former Beneficial Bank branches were rebranded as WSFS Bank.

In 2011, WSFS celebrated its 25th anniversary on NASDAQ. Continued growth came with the opening of a new regional headquarters and branch at the corners of Kirkwood Highway and Route 7 in Delaware in 2012.

In 2018, WSFS was voted #1 Bank in Delaware by readers of the Wilmington News Journal and delawareonline.com in their annual Readers' Choice Awards for 2018. This was the eighth consecutive year that WSFS was honored with this award. In 2022, WSFS was named a "Top Workplace" for the 16th year in a row by The News Journal.

In 2024, WSFS won the Gallup Exceptional Workplace Award for the eight time and in 2020 had been named winner of the Gallup Culture Transformation Award. The awards recognize companies that embrace Associate engagement and make it a fundamental foundation of their business. In 2025, WSFS was named a "Top Workplace" by The Philadelphia Inquirer for the tenth consecutive year.

On January 1, 2019, Rodger Levenson became WSFS’ 13th President and CEO in the company's 186-year history. WSFS also elevated Mark A. Turner from chairman to Executive Chairman of the board of directors. Mr. Turner stepped aside from the roles of President and CEO on December 31, 2018, after a dozen years as WSFS’ Chief Executive, where he successfully guided the company through the 2008 Financial Crisis, Great Recession, Government intervention in banking and a regulatory regime change.

On January 1, 2020, Rodger Levenson assumed the role of chairman of the Board of Directors, in addition to his role as president and CEO. Mark A. Turner stepped aside from his role as Executive Chairman.

== Operations ==
WSFS offers traditional retail banking services such as checking and savings accounts, certificates of deposit, consumer mortgages, lines of credit, and home equity loans. WSFS also offers commercial banking services for small businesses, business banking and middle market customers, and for real estate development and investment. Other subsidiaries or divisions of WSFS Financial Corporation include:

Bryn Mawr Trust Advisors, is a division of WSFS Bank focusing attention and resources on financial planning for high-net-worth individuals, families, and institutions.

Cash Connect, a division of WSFS Bank, is a provider of ATM vault cash and smart safe cash logistics services in the United States. Cash Connect funds over 36,000 ATMs in all 50 states. Cash Connect also operates more than 600 ATMs for WSFS Bank, which has one of the largest ATM networks in the Greater Delaware Valley.

Bryn Mawr Capital Management, LLC, is an SEC-registered investment adviser and a subsidiary of WSFS Financial Corporation with a primary market segment of high net worth individuals and institutions offering fully customized investment, tax and estate planning strategies.

The Bryn Mawr Trust Company of Delaware is a Delaware limited purpose trust company that offers Delaware Advantage trust services, including directed trusts, asset protection trusts and dynasty trusts.

Powdermill Financial Solutions serves families of high net worth, entrepreneurs, and corporate executives.

WSFS Institutional Services, a division of WSFS Bank, offers owner and indenture trustee services for asset-backed securities, indenture trustee for corporate debt issuances, administrative and collateral agent for the leveraged loan market, as well as custody, escrow, verification agent and independent director services.

WSFS Wealth Investments provides insurance and brokerage products primarily to WSFS Bank's retail banking clients.

WSFS Mortgage, a division of WSFS Bank, is a leading mortgage lender providing a wide range of mortgage programs in the Delaware Valley and nationally. Arrow Land Transfer is a related title insurance agent serving communities in Delaware, Pennsylvania and New Jersey.

NewLane Finance, a division of WSFS Bank, is a commercial equipment finance company.

== Acquisitions ==
WSFS began a series of acquisitions in 2004 when it acquired Cypress Capital Management, a registered investment advisor with a primary market segment of high net worth individuals offering a balanced investment style focused on current income and preservation of capital.

WSFS expanded its presence in Delaware in 2008 when it acquired the Delaware branch network of Sun National Bank.

In 2010, WSFS Bank acquired Christiana Bank & Trust company and integrated the trust division as part of WSFS' Wealth division.

In 2013, WSFS acquired Array Financial Group, Inc., a Delaware Valley mortgage banking company and a related entity, Arrow Land Transfer Company (Arrow), an abstract and title company. Both are headquartered in nearby Haverford, Pennsylvania. Also in 2013, WSFS announced the acquisition of The First National Bank of Wyoming and was granted approval by the OCC in June 2014 to complete the purchase of the bank, which was headquartered in Wyoming, Delaware. WSFS completed the acquisition in September 2014.

WSFS announced in April 2015 that it would acquire Alliance Bank, headquartered in Broomall, Pennsylvania and was granted approval by the OCC in September 2015. Alliance Bank had eight branches and reported approximately $421 million in assets, $310 million in loans and $345 million in deposits as of December 2014. The merger was completed in October 2015, giving WSFS 17 locations in southeastern Pennsylvania, including 11 in Delaware County.

In November 2015, WSFS announced it would acquire Penn Liberty Bank, headquartered in Wayne, Pennsylvania. It received all approvals to complete the acquisition in April 2016. The merger was completed in August 2016. WSFS Bank grew to more 70 offices including 24 locations in southeastern Pennsylvania, significantly strengthening WSFS' market position in that region.

Also in August 2016, WSFS acquired Powdermill Financial Solutions, LLC. Powdermill is a multi-family office located in Wilmington, Delaware and serves an affluent clientele in the local community and throughout the United States. The firm specializes in high net worth individuals, families and corporate executives.

WSFS announced in October 2016 that it acquired Philadelphia-based West Capital Management.

In August 2018, WSFS and Beneficial Bancorp, Inc., jointly announced the signing of a definitive agreement whereby WSFS would acquire Beneficial to create the largest and longest-standing locally headquartered community bank in the Greater Delaware Valley. At the time of the announcement, the acquisition was the third-largest bank deal of 2018. WSFS' acquisition of Beneficial was completed in March 2019 growing the bank to 152 locations in the market with $12.2 billion in assets. WSFS rebranded or consolidated all former Beneficial Bank locations to WSFS Bank on August 26, 2019.

In March 2021, WSFS announced the acquisition of Bryn Mawr Bank Corporation for $976.4 million, further expanding the bank's footprint in the Philadelphia suburbs. At the time Bryn Mawr Bank Corp. operated 41 branches under the Bryn Mawr Trust name. WSFS plans to maintain the historic Bryn Mawr Trust office building in on Lancaster Avenue in Bryn Mawr, but anticipates closing as many as 30% of the combined companies' branches. The combined bank will control nearly 7% of bank deposits in the Philadelphia region.

== Memberships ==
WSFS Bank is a member of the Federal Deposit Insurance Corporation, and is an Equal Housing Lender. WSFS Bank uses STAR and PLUS for its ATM transactions.
