= Harbor Square =

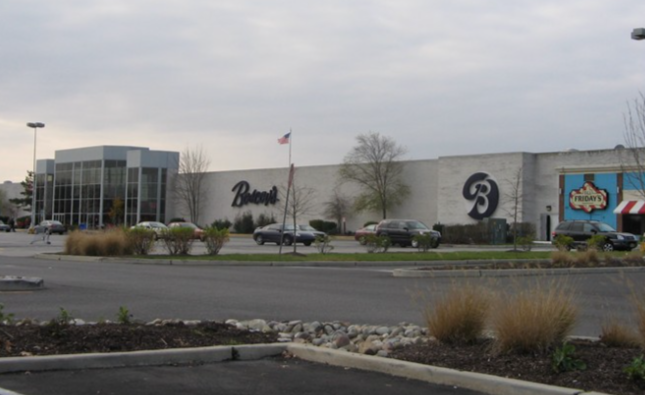
- Harbor Square in 2023
- Location: Egg Harbor Township, New Jersey, United States
- Coordinates: 39.40012°N 74.56472°W
- Opened: 1968
- Owner: Aetna Realty
- Num. of stores: 50+ at peak
- Num. of anchor tenants: 3
- Floor area: 337,423 sq ft (31,347.6 m^{2})
- Floors: 1 (2 in Boscov's)
- Public transit: NJ Transit bus: 502; SJTA: English Creek-Tilton Road Community Shuttle

Harbor Square, formerly Shore Mall, is a shopping plaza (formerly a shopping mall) in Egg Harbor Township, New Jersey in the United States on U.S. Route 40/U.S. Route 322 originally known as "Searstown". The plaza is accessible from Exit 36 off the Garden State Parkway. The plaza is owned by Aetna Realty. The plaza has a gross leasable area of 337,423 ft², formerly 620,000 ft² when it was a mall, located on 73 acres (300,000 m^{2}) of land. The plaza's anchor stores include Boscov's, Restaurant Depot, Spirit Halloweens Flagship Location, and Proshot Pickleball.

== History ==
=== 1968–1988 ===
Shore Mall originally opened in 1968 as an open-air mall called Searstown. Original anchor stores included Sears, Grant City and a Pantry Pride supermarket. Between 1971 and 1974, the mall was enclosed and expanded, with regional up-market department store Steinbach being added as a fourth anchor store. A time capsule was buried next to the Steinbach store to be opened 100 years later on March 20, 2074. Grant City closed in 1976 when the chain declared bankruptcy; by the end of the year, JCPenney opened in the former Grant City space. Pantry Pride was subsequently replaced with Foodtown, and the mall was renamed Shore Mall.

In 1987, Developer Kravco Company (Kravco Company LLC) and JCP Realty, the development arm of JCPenney, opened the new Hamilton Mall about 5 miles west on the Black Horse Pike (U.S. Route 40 and U.S. Route 322). This caused problems with the Shore Mall, because the Sears and JCPenney anchors moved to the Hamilton Mall. With the two anchors gone, Shore Mall underwent a fair sized renovation enclosing the still open-air portion between the two anchors as well as re-tiling the mall to its current blue and white color scheme.

In 1988, Clover Discount Store, a discount chain owned by the Strawbridge's chain (now Macy's), opened in the former JCPenney/Grant City space, while Boscov's replaced the former Sears. Circuit City opened in the former Foodtown, which closed in the early 1990s. Steinbach went out of business in 1995 but was replaced in 1996 with Value City Department Store. Clover closed in 1997 when that chain also faced closure by its parent company, becoming Burlington Coat Factory a year later.

=== 2004–2010 ===
In 2004, Circuit City moved to a strip mall called Hamilton Commons near the Hamilton Mall. The Circuit City's location at the mall was replaced with a K&G Fashion Superstore in 2006 (which has since closed). Since then it has remained vacant but in 2012 it was purchased by Spencer’s Gifts for their sister company Spirit Halloween to use as a permanent Flagship Location. In January 2006, the Shore Mall was sold Cedar Realty Trust for $36.5 million, with initial plans to "de-mall" the mall converting it into an open-air plaza.

In 2008, the Value City store at Shore Mall was among 24 locations sold by Value City's parent company to Burlington Coat Factory. The store closed on September 21, 2008 and remained vacant until it was occupied temporarily by The Community Food Bank of New Jersey in 2011-2012 while their permanent location was torn down and reconstructed.

Construction began in 2010 on a Golden Corral restaurant near the main entrance to the mall (where the former Dairy Queen stood, before moving into the outer building where the AT&T store and Wells Fargo bank are located) and opened in 2011.

In August 2010, Cedar Shopping Centers applied for a state Economic Redevelopment and Growth(ERG) grant in the amount of $3 million to $41 million. The grant would be used to help finance an $87 million revamp of the mall. The plan called for demolishing most of the mall (except Boscov's, Burlington Coat Factory, and all everything else that can be seen from the Black Horse Pike), then converting the site to a strip mall with four additional large stores. It also includes $23 million for transportation upgrades such as a reconfiguration of Exit 36 of the Garden State Parkway, an intersection between West Jersey Avenue and the Black Horse Pike, and a boulevard style road network.

=== 2012–present ===
In July 2012, Cedar Realty Trust announced plans to raze 1/3 (over 250,000 square feet) of the mall including the former Value City location, forcing tenants to relocate. After demolition, Cedar Realty Trust planned to do some improvements to the location such as a new south entrance to what is remained of the main shopping center, new landscaping, parking lot improvements, and fencing off the excess land in the rear part of the property to put up for sale as vacant commercial land unless phases of new development occur under the owner.

On January 28, 2013, the Steinbach Time Capsule was dug up in a small ceremony due to demolition process needing it to be moved. The plaque and contents of the capsule were given to the Egg Harbor Township Historical Society who will create a display in remembrance of the mall at their location. Demolition continued through early-mid 2013, including the former Value City store.

The New Jersey Motor Vehicle Commission office closed on August 23 and August 24, 2013, due to demolition of the back of the mall and the relocation to behind Boscov's which opened on August 26

The center was renamed Harbor Square in October 2013. In February 2014, Cedar Realty Trust sold Harbor Square to Aetna Realty for $25 million.

In February 2017, the Carrabba's was closed abruptly along with 13 others due to under performance. In fall 2019, Burlington Coat Factory moved to Consumer Square in Mays Landing.

In early 2020, Golden Corral permanently closed due to the COVID-19 pandemic. Umi Sushi opened in August 2023 along with Restaurant Depot and Proshot Pickleball in the former Burlington.

== Gallery ==
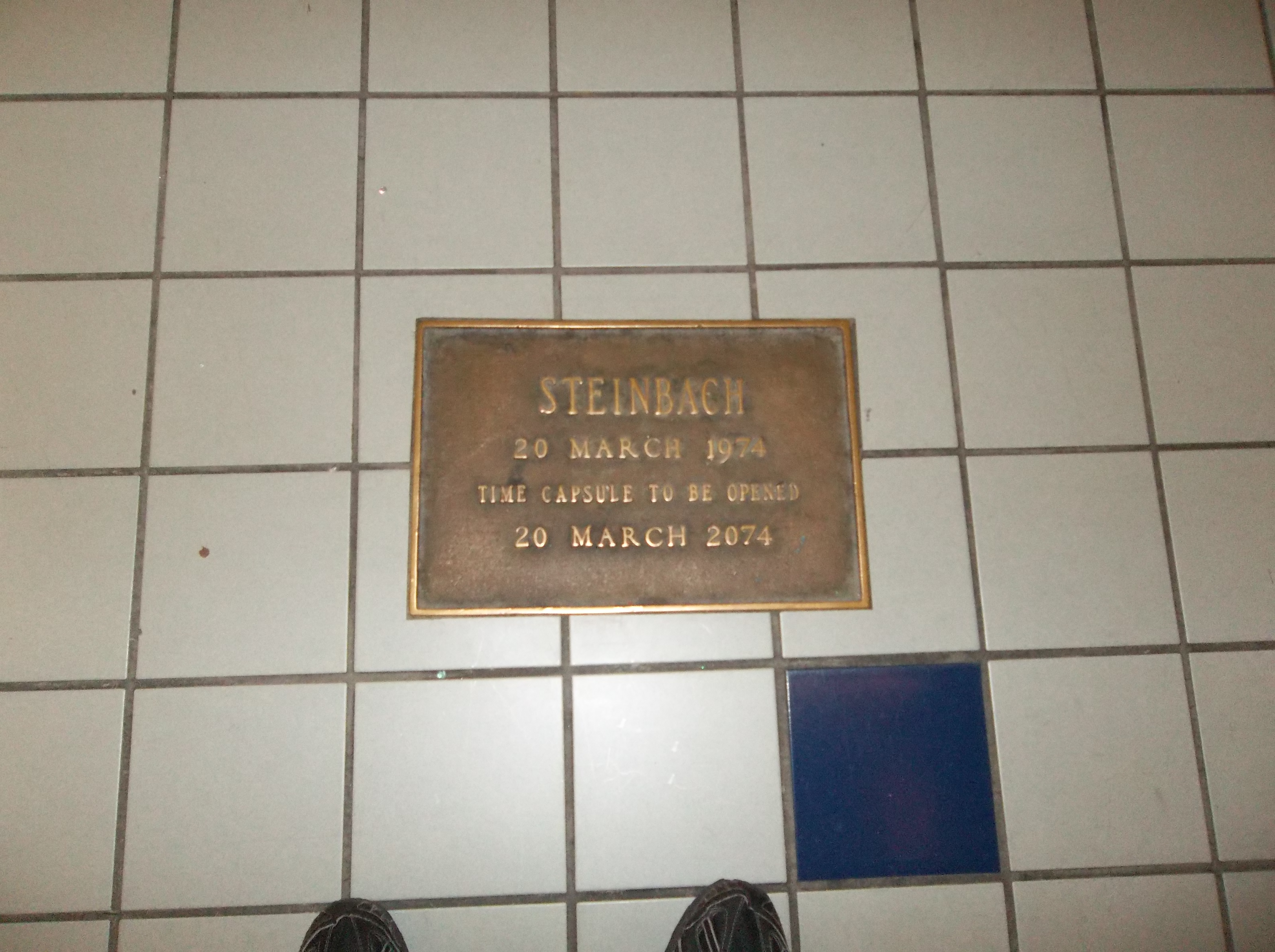
The Shore Mall Time Capsule. Buried in 1974 and un-earthed on January 28, 2013 due to the demolition of part of the mall. The plaque and content are currently in the hands of Greater Egg Harbor Township Historical Society.

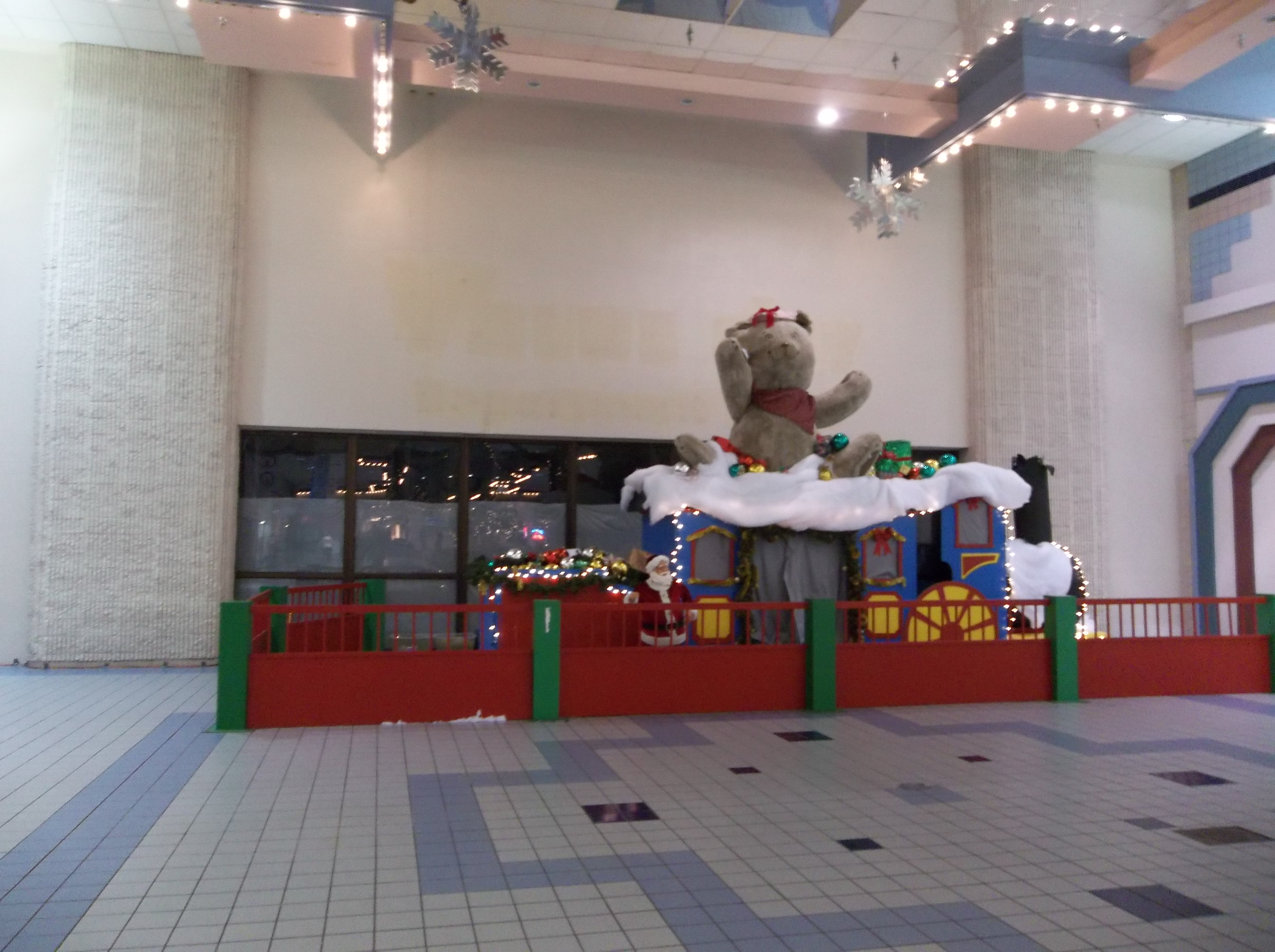
The Former Steinbach/Value City entrance from the mall, 2012

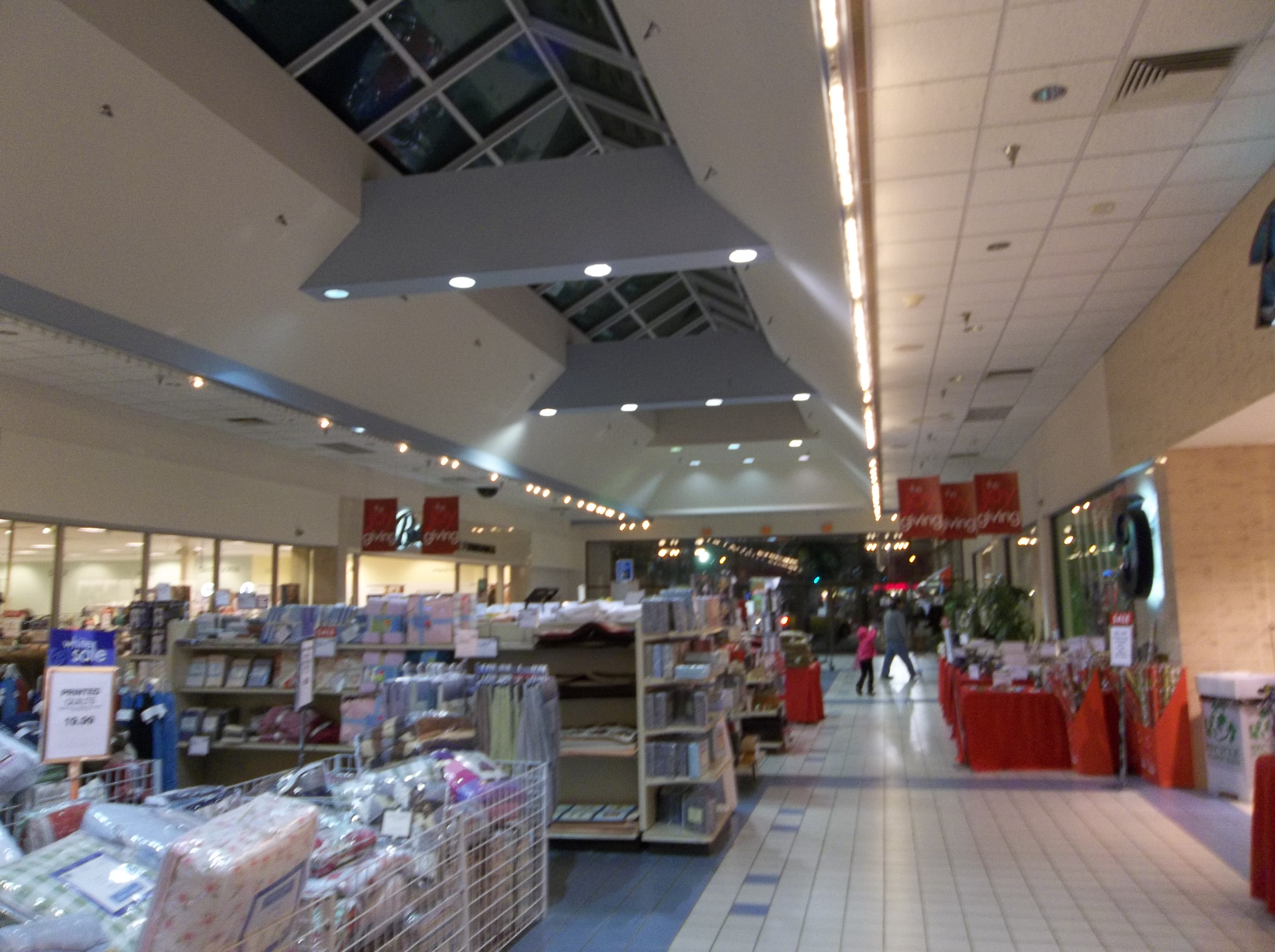
Front of the Mall's "Hall" facing the front, to the left includes Boscov's Furniture. To the right is the main Boscov's store and the center is also Boscov's Merchandise.

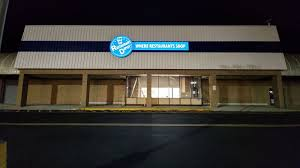
Work Underway for Restaurant Depot in 2023

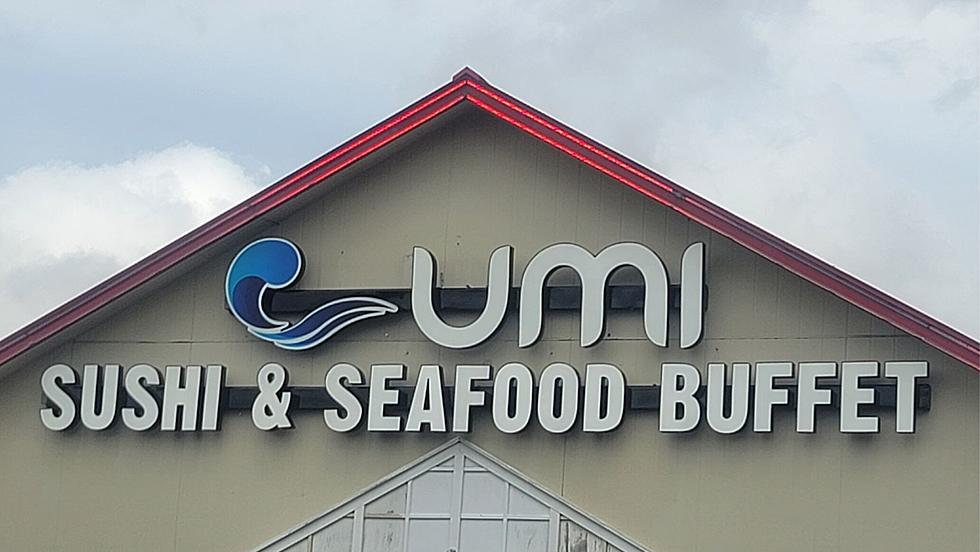
Umi Sushi in former golden corral in August 2023

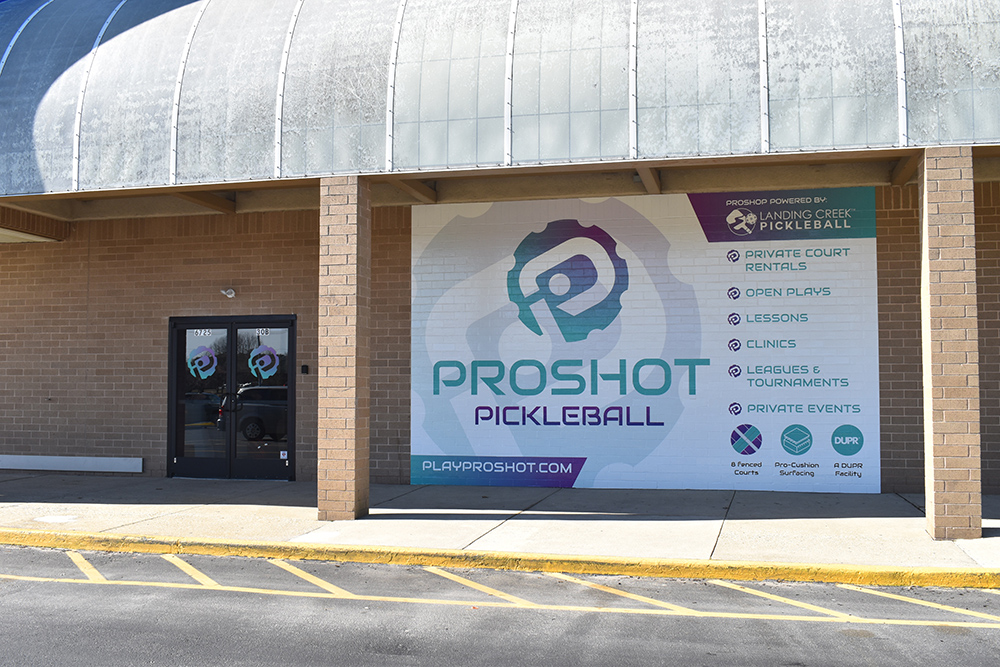
Proshot Pickeball in former Burlington in June 2023

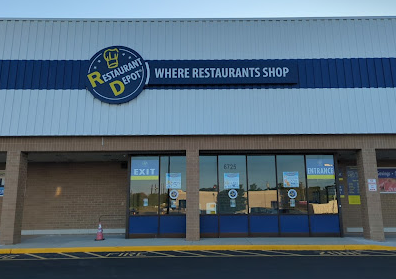
Restaurant Depot in former Burlington in May 2023
