= Willow Grove Park Mall =

Shopping mall in Willow Grove, Pennsylvania, U.S.

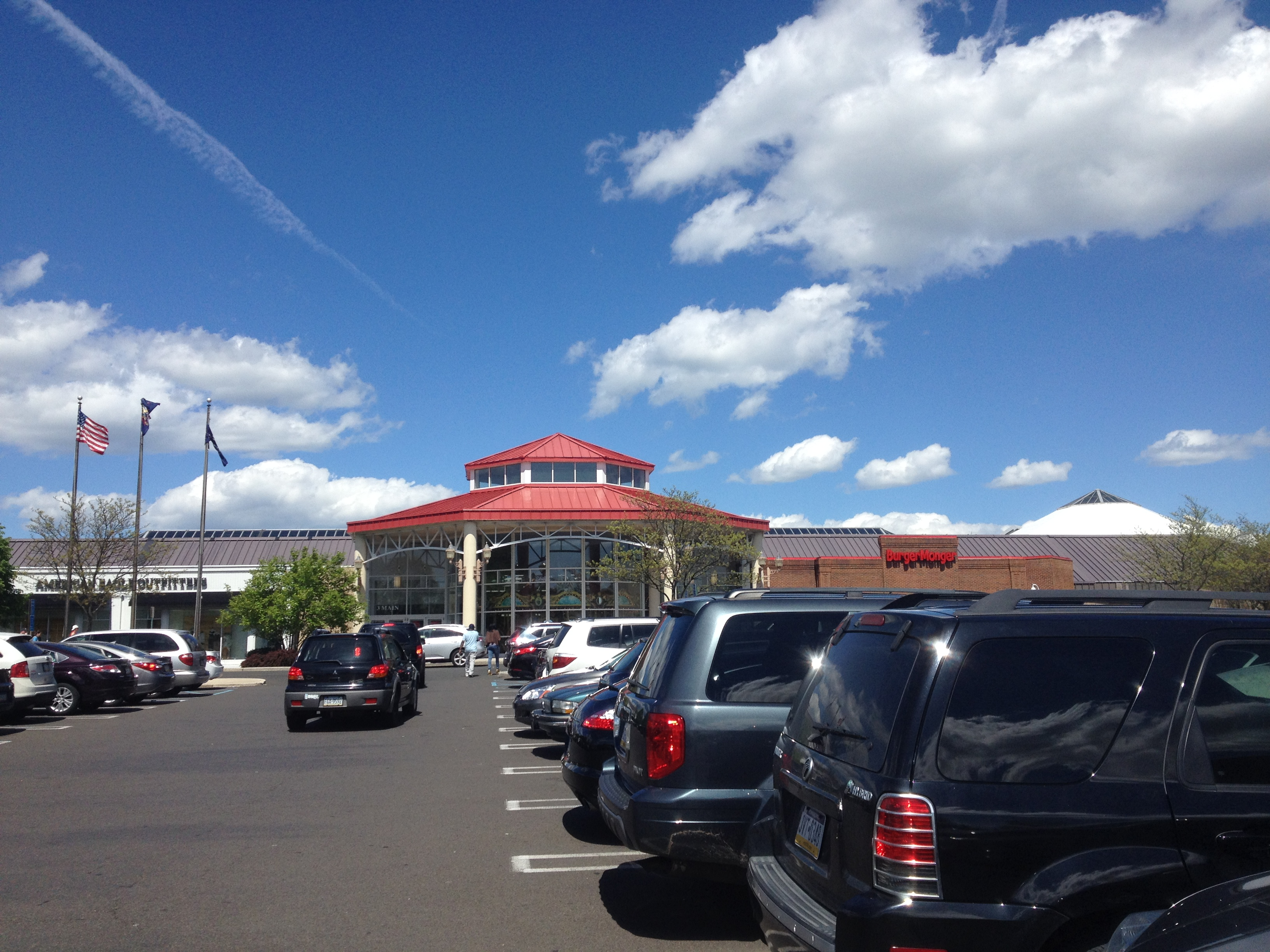
- The third-floor carousel entrance of the Willow Grove Park Mall in May 2016
- Location: Willow Grove, Pennsylvania, U.S.
- Coordinates: 40.1402°N 75.1234°W
- Address: 2500 Moreland Road; Willow Grove, Pennsylvania, 19090, U.S.
- Opened: August 11, 1982; 44 years ago
- Developer: Federated Stores Realty; The Rubin Organization
- Manager: Mason Asset Management
- Owner: Namdar Realty Group
- Architect: RTKL Associates
- Num. of stores: 120+
- Num. of anchor tenants: 6 (5 open, 1 vacant)
- Floor area: 1,203,423 square feet (111,802 m^{2})
- Floors: 3 (1 in Nordstrom Rack and Reclectic, 2 in Primark, and Tilted 10)
- Parking: Parking lot; Parking garage
- Public transit: SEPTA bus: 22, 55, 95, 310
- Website: willowgroveparkmall.com

Willow Grove Park Mall is a super-regional shopping mall located in the community of Willow Grove in Abington Township, Pennsylvania at the intersection of Easton Road and Moreland Road (Pennsylvania Route 63) in the Philadelphia suburbs. The Willow Grove Park Mall contains over 120 stores - with Bloomingdale's, Primark, Macy's, Nordstrom Rack, and Tilted 10 as anchor stores - along with several restaurants including The Cheesecake Factory and Yard House. It is owned by Namdar Realty Group and is the third most profitable mall in the Philadelphia metropolitan area. The mall features a carousel, scenic elevator, and formerly featured a fountain.

== Overview ==
The Willow Grove Park Mall is located on the site of the previous Willow Grove Amusement Park in the census-designated place of Willow Grove in Abington Township, Montgomery County, Pennsylvania, 15 miles (24 km) north of Center City Philadelphia in the northern suburbs of the city. The mall is bordered by Pennsylvania Route 63 (Moreland Road) to the northeast, Easton Road to the southeast, and Old Welsh Road to the southwest. The mall is located near Pennsylvania Route 611 and is a little more than a mile from the Willow Grove exit of the Pennsylvania Turnpike. The Willow Grove Park Mall serves as a transit hub for SEPTA bus routes 22, 55, 95, and 310. The mall is also near the Willow Grove station on the Warminster Line of SEPTA Regional Rail. The Willow Grove Park Mall has a market area that covers eastern Montgomery County along with Northwest Philadelphia, North Philadelphia, Northeast Philadelphia, and portions of central Bucks County.

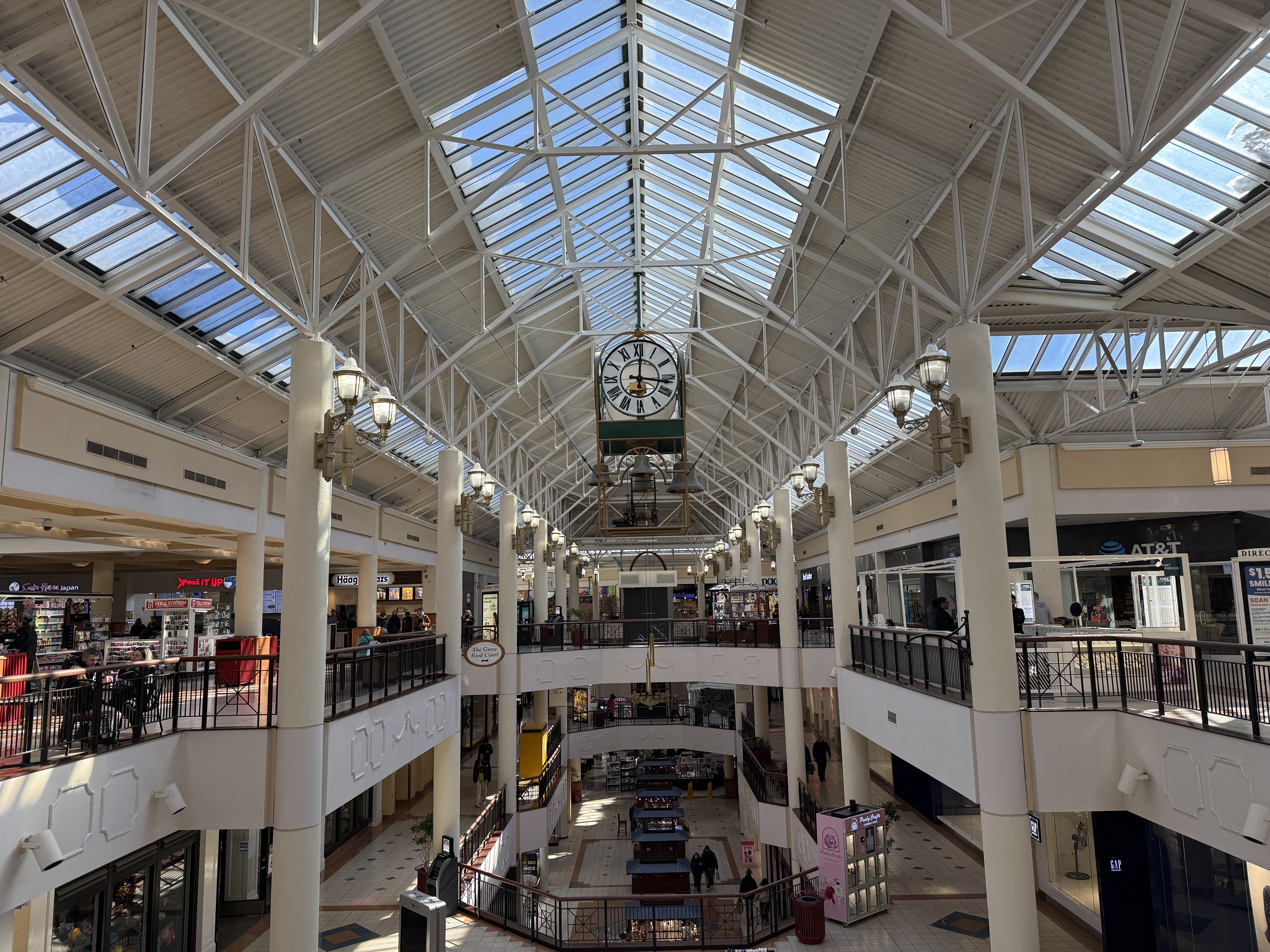
A view of the mall from the third floor near The Grove food court in February 2026

The Willow Grove Park Mall currently contains five anchor stores. Bloomingdale's, which is 237,537 square feet (22,068 m^{2}), opened in 1982 when the mall was built. The Bloomingdale's store is one of two located in the Philadelphia area. Macy's, which is 225,000 square feet (20,903 m^{2}), opened in 2001 as part of a mall expansion. An anchor space opened in 1982 as B. Altman and Company before becoming Sears in 1987. In 2015, Sears reduced its space from 175,584 square feet (16,312 m^{2}) to 96,000 square feet (8,919 m^{2}) on the first floor while leasing 77,500 square feet (7,200 m^{2}) of space to Primark, mainly on the second floor. Sears closed its store at Willow Grove Park Mall in 2022. The former Sears space became Recletic in 2026. Another anchor space opened in 1982 as Abraham & Straus before becoming Strawbridge & Clothier (later Strawbridge's) in 1988. Strawbridge's closed in 2006. A part of the former space on the third floor reopened as The Cheesecake Factory in 2007, which is 10,310 square feet (958 m^{2}) in area. Another part of the former Strawbridge's became a 7,500 square feet (697 m^{2}) Bravo! Cucina Italiana that opened in 2011; Bravo! Cucina Italiana later closed and the space became Yard House in 2019. In addition, a relocated two-story 17,000 square feet (1,579 m^{2}) Forever 21 opened in a small portion of the former Strawbridge's in December 2011. The lower two floors of the Strawbridge's space became a 114,000 square feet (10,591 m^{2}) JCPenney store in 2012. JCPenney officials announced that the Willow Grove store will be among 138 locations the company will shutter; the store closed on July 31, 2017. The former JCPenney became a Tilted 10 entertainment center in 2023. The remaining area of the former Strawbridge's on the third floor opened as a 41,000 square feet (3,809 m^{2}) Nordstrom Rack in 2012.

In addition to the anchor stores, the Willow Grove Park Mall contains over 130 smaller stores, including Apple Store, a two-story H&M, Lucky Brand Jeans, Sephora, Victoria's Secret, Build-A-Bear Workshop, Go! Games & Toys, and GameStop. The mall also contains a food court with eleven spaces as well as three sit-down restaurants: The Cheesecake Factory, TGI Fridays (closed January 2024), and Yard House.

== History ==
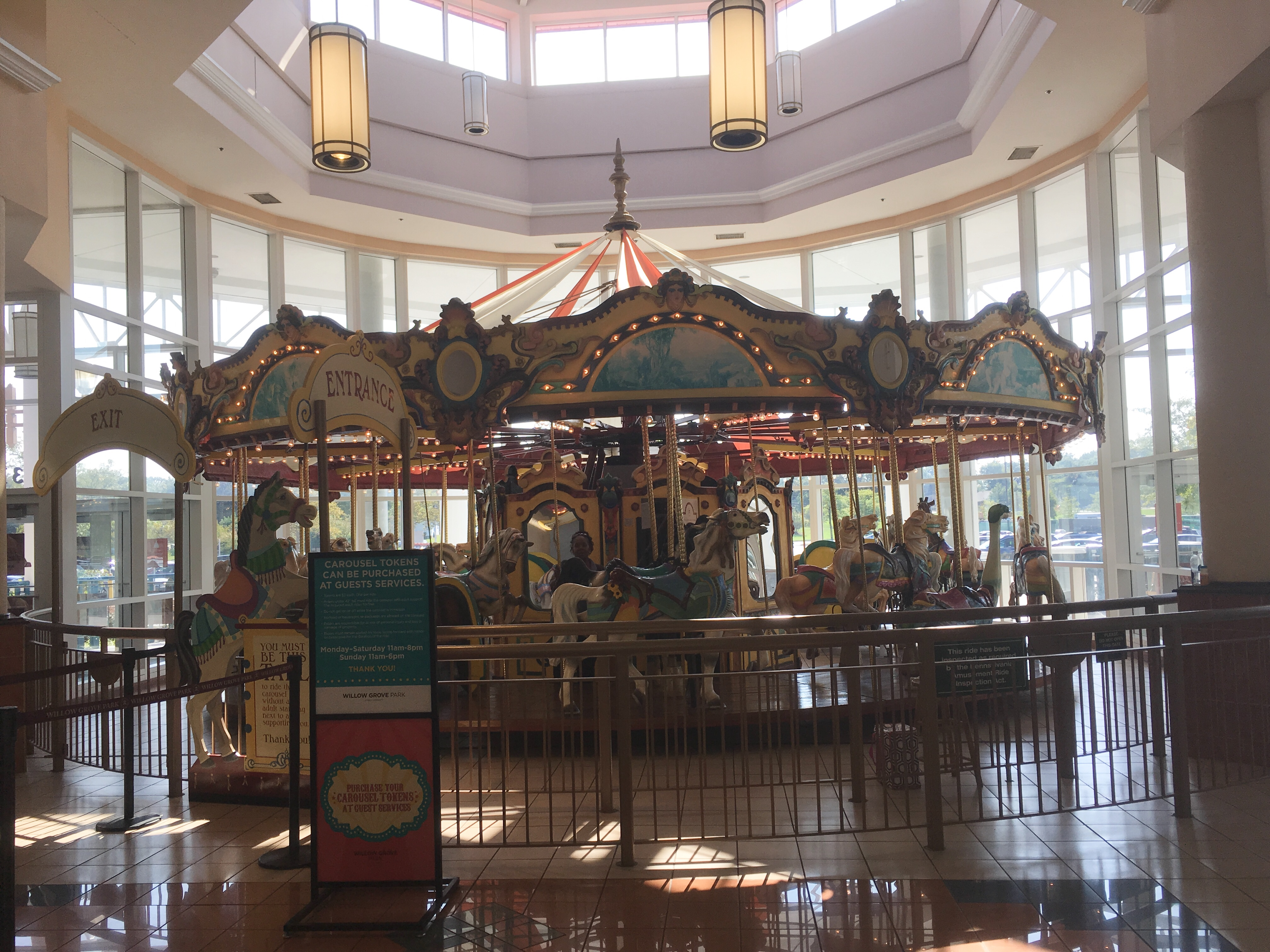
Carousel on the third floor of the mall

The current site of the Willow Grove Park Mall was originally Willow Grove Park, a popular amusement park that existed from 1896 to 1975. In 1978, Federated Department Stores and The Rubin Organization announced plans to build a US$25 million mall on the site of the former amusement park. The plans for the mall were approved by Abington Township in 1979, which included a downsizing to three anchor stores from four among concerns from residents about the size of the future mall. The Willow Grove Park Mall opened on August 11, 1982. The mall was designed with a Victorian theme honoring the former amusement park. The developers of the Willow Grove Park Mall were Federated Department Stores and The Rubin Organization and the architect was RTKL. When the mall opened, the original anchor stores were Bloomingdale's, Abraham & Straus, and B. Altman and Company. Bloomingdale's had relocated to the mall from a freestanding store in Jenkintown. When it opened, the Willow Grove Park Mall was intended to be an upscale mall. In 1984, Federated Department Stores sold its share of the mall to the Equitable Life Assurance Society of the United States for US$43 million. In 1986, B. Altman and Company closed its store, which reopened as Sears in 1987. Sears relocated to the mall from a store in Abington. Around this time, the store selection at the mall broadened to also target the middle class. In 1988 Abraham & Straus closed and became Strawbridge & Clothier, which had relocated to the mall from a store in Jenkintown.

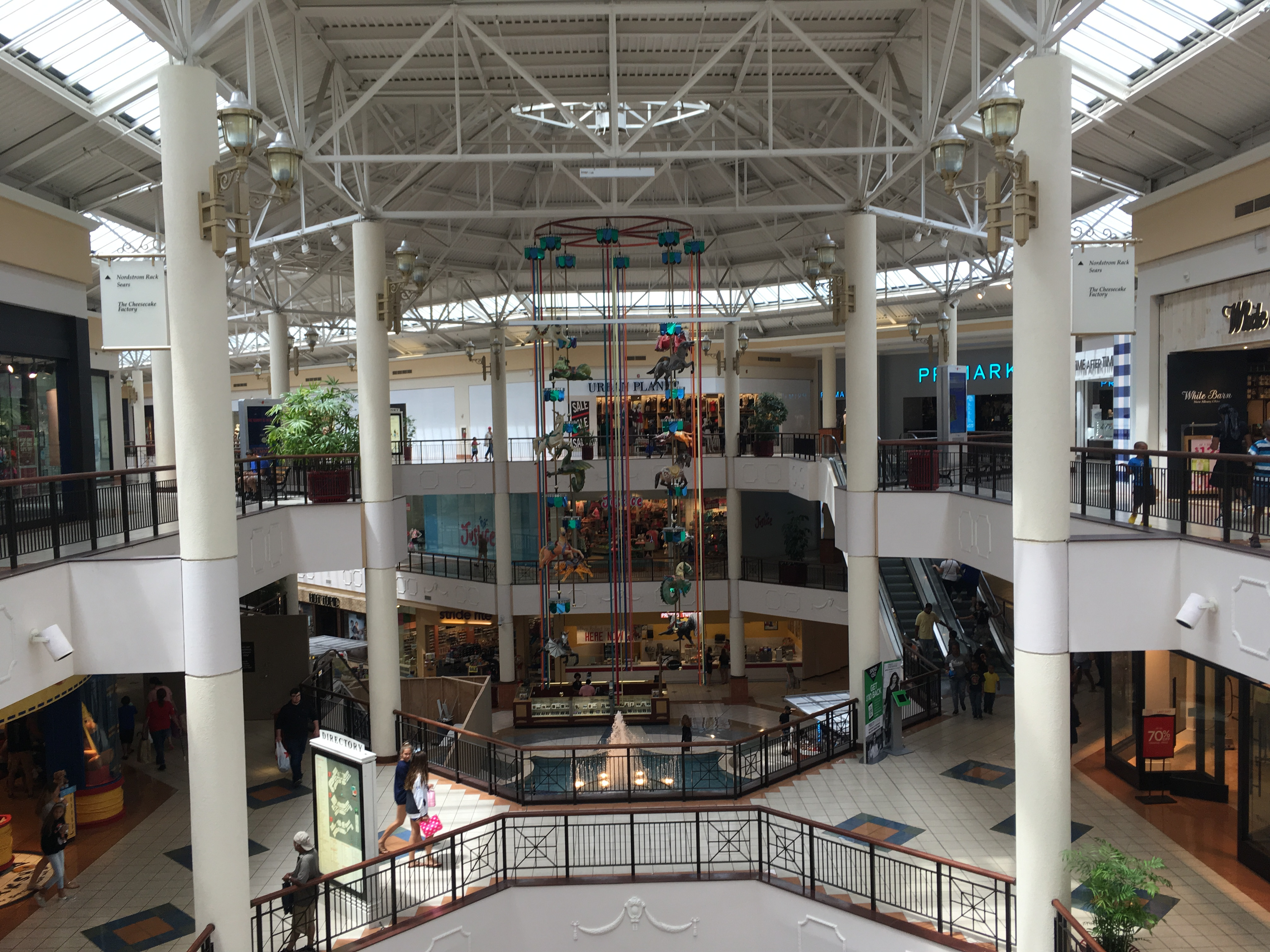
Third floor of the mall looking toward Primark

The mall was acquired by PREIT and the Pennsylvania State Employees' Retirement System in 2000 for US$140 million from a group of pension fund clients managed by Lend Lease Real Estate Investments. In 2001, the mall underwent a major renovation which included the addition of Macy's as an anchor, the construction of a 212,000 square feet (19,695 m^{2}) parking garage with 800 parking spaces adjacent to Sears and the food court, and the addition of a carousel at the third-floor entrance opposite the food court. The renovation of the mall cost US$25 million. PREIT assumed full ownership of the Willow Grove Park Mall in 2003 by acquiring the Pennsylvania State Employees’ Retirement System's 70% share of ownership for US$122.3 million. In 2005, a mosaic wall with images from the former Willow Grove Park was installed in the mall. The mosaics were created by the Abington Art Center's Youth Empowerment Program and the Abington Township Balanced and Restorative Justice Program from designs made by Carol Strinton-Broad. In 2006, Strawbridge's closed due to the acquisition of its parent company May Department Stores by Federated Department Stores; a small portion of the former store on the upper floor became home to The Cheesecake Factory in September 2007. The lower two floors were planned to open as Boscov's; however, it never opened due to the chain filing for Chapter 11 bankruptcy in 2008.

On July 28, 2011, it was announced that JCPenney would open a store on the lower two floors of the vacant Strawbridge's. In addition, it was announced that Bravo! Cucina Italiana and Nordstrom Rack would open locations on the third floor of the former Strawbridge's. Bravo! Cucina Italiana opened in November 2011 while Nordstrom Rack opened in May 2012. Forever 21 also relocated to a larger store at the former Strawbridge's site in December 2011. The JCPenney store opened in October 2012. On January 30, 2015, it was announced that Sears would lease some of its space to Irish retailer Primark. Sears would remain in its space on the first level while Primark will operate in the remainder of the space, mainly on the second level. Primark opened on July 19, 2016. On March 17, 2017, it was announced that the JCPenney store would be closing as part of a plan to close 138 stores nationwide. The JCPenney store closed on July 31, 2017.

A Macy's Backstage outlet store concept opened within the Macy's store on June 2, 2018. On January 24, 2018, the Abington Township Board of Commissioners approved plans for a Studio Movie Grill in the former JCPenney space. The Studio Movie Grill was to be an 11-screen dine-in movie theater with a bar. Studio Movie Grill was planned to open in early 2020 before plans were cancelled. On March 10, 2023, a Tilted 10 entertainment center opened in the former JCPenney space. On December 2, 2019, a Yard House restaurant opened at the mall in the space formerly occupied by Bravo! Cucina Italiana.

On January 18, 2022, it was announced that Sears would close in 2022. This was the last full-service Sears location in Pennsylvania. On February 27, 2026, Recletic, a store which carries clothing from Urban Outfitters brands at discount prices, opened in the former Sears space, relocating from the Franklin Mall.

In March 2026, the Willow Grove Park Mall was put up for sale by lender PGIM to sell its debt after a $170 million loan to PREIT matured. In August 2026, the mall was under contract to be sold to Namdar Realty Group, Mason Asset Management, and CH Capital.

== Notable incidents ==
On November 25, 2006, during one of the busiest shopping weekends of the year after Thanksgiving, a small fire broke out in the Forever 21 store that forced the evacuation of 6,000 shoppers; no injuries were reported.

On the evening of June 15, 2011, a 16-year-old boy from Upper Moreland Township who was smoking synthetic cannabis jumped from the third level of the parking garage, suffering injuries.

On April 13, 2023, a criminal incident at the mall gained viral attention in which shoplifter Abdi Wasuge attempted to steal products from the Apple Store on the second floor and vaulted over a railing in an attempt to escape authorities following a confrontation with another person, breaking his pelvis and tailbone.

== Economic impact ==
The Willow Grove Park Mall serves as a major regional attraction for Abington Township and is the third most profitable mall in the Philadelphia area. In the Pennsylvania part of the Philadelphia area, the Willow Grove Park Mall is the second most profitable mall after the King of Prussia Mall. The mall is regarded as one of three most successful locations for retailers entering the Philadelphia market due to its location and store selection. In 2019, the Willow Grove Park Mall saw sales per square foot of $763, which is the highest among all malls owned by PREIT. The mall employed 2,065 people in 2018, making it the third largest employer in Abington Township with 7.86% of the jobs in the township.

The opening of the Willow Grove Park Mall led to the decline of retail along Old York Road in Abington and Jenkintown, with department stores such as Bloomingdale's, Sears, and Strawbridge & Clothier relocating from this area to the mall during the 1980s. A Lord & Taylor store in Jenkintown closed in 1989, but was eventually replaced by the King of Prussia mall location in 1995.
