= Strawbridge and Clothier Store =

- Strawbridge and Clothier Store, Jenkintown
- U.S. National Register of Historic Places
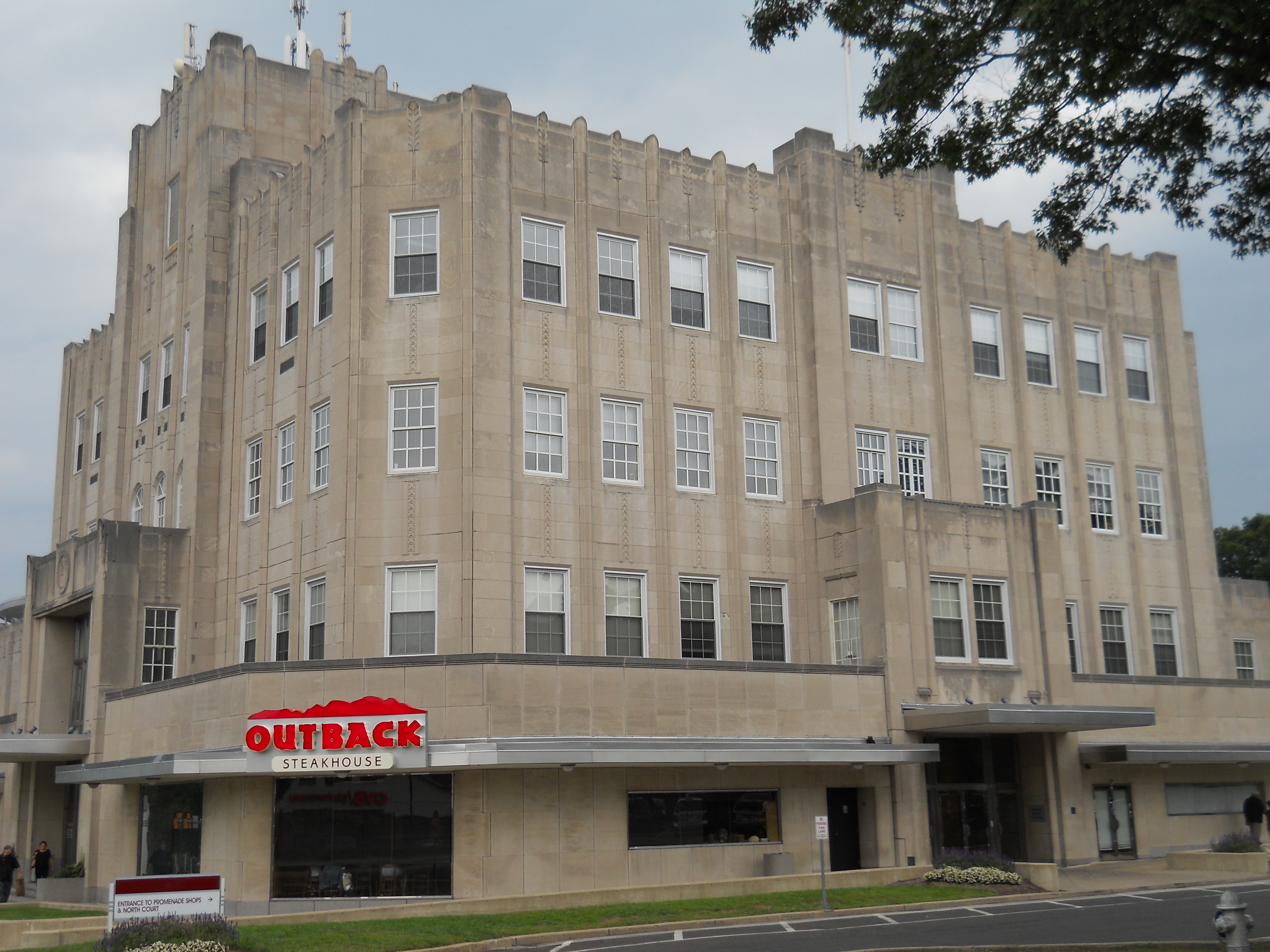
- The store in 2012

- Location within Pennsylvania Location within the United States
- Location: 680 Old York Rd. N of Rydal Rd. Jenkintown, Pennsylvania, U.S.
- Coordinates: 40°6′6″N 75°7′32″W
- Area: 7.9 acres (3.2 ha)
- Built: 1930-1931, 1954
- Architect: Dreher & Churchman; Herbert B. Beidler
- Architectural style: Art Deco
- NRHP reference No.: 88003047
- Added to NRHP: December 22, 1988

The Strawbridge and Clothier Store is a historic department store building located at Jenkintown, Montgomery County, Pennsylvania. It was built by Strawbridge & Clothier in 1930-1931 and renovated and expanded in 1954. It closed in 1988 when it relocated to the Willow Grove Park Mall. It is now an office building, multi-tenant.

== History ==
The original section is a four-story, steel frame structure faced in limestone and on a granite base in the Art Deco style. It has a flat slag roof with parapet. The building features piers that extend above the roof parapet, two-story projecting entrance pavilions, a one-story flat roofed extension with elegant display windows, and two five-story towers. The addition is a three-story structure with a parking garage. It was built as the second suburban branch of Strawbridge and Clothier. This Strawbridge & Clothier store closed in 1988 when it relocated to the Willow Grove Park Mall. In the late 1990s, the building served as the headquarters of fast-growing online music retailer CDNow. It currently houses an Outback Steakhouse.

The building was added to the National Register of Historic Places in 1988.

The building was built on the site of Wyndhurst, banker John Milton Colton's estate containing a Horace Trumbauer-designed Tudor-style residence built 1899-1900. The main residence was razed in 1930 to build the Jenkintown store, but one of the outbuildings in similar Tudor style remains at 2 Rydal Rd.
