= Hamilton Mall =

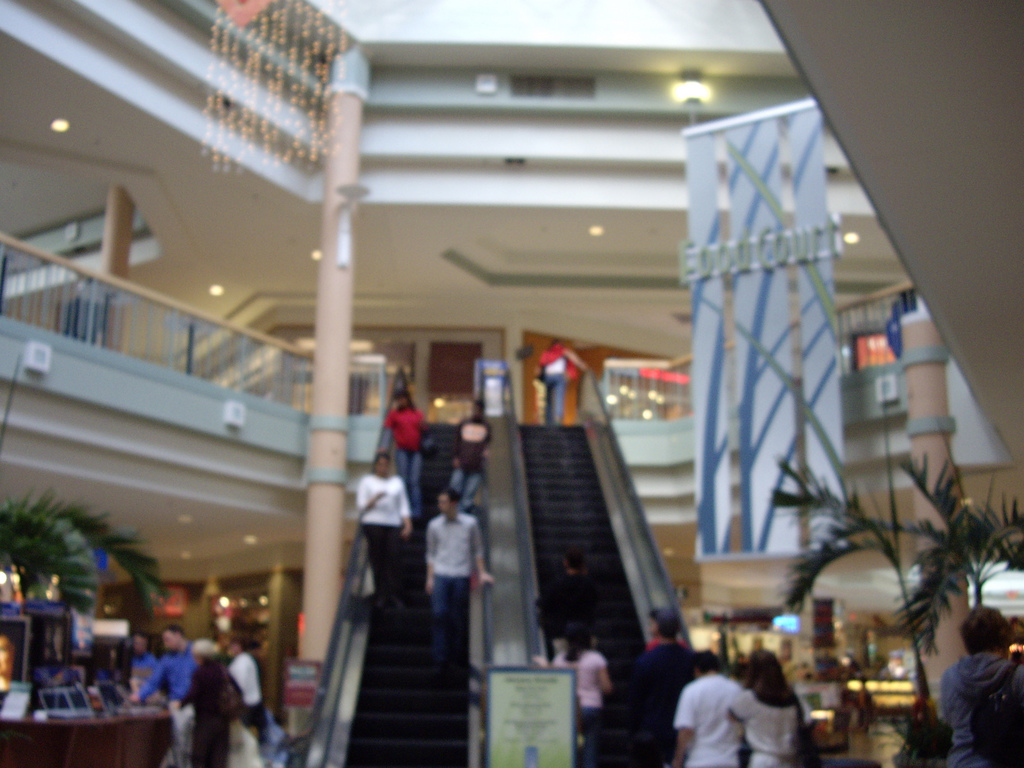
- The center court in January 2007
- Location: Mays Landing, New Jersey, United States
- Coordinates: 39.45369°N 74.64352°W
- Opened: September 10, 1987; 39 years ago
- Developer: The Kravco Company and JCP Realty, Inc.
- Manager: Mason Asset Management
- Owner: Namdar Realty Group
- Num. of stores: 40+
- Num. of anchor tenants: 3 (2 open, 1 vacant) and 3 Junior Anchors
- Floor area: 1,028,500 sq ft (95,550 m^{2})
- Floors: 2 (3 in Macy's)
- Parking: Parking lot
- Public transit: NJ Transit bus: 502, 508, 553
- Website: shophamilton.com

The Hamilton Mall is a shopping mall in Mays Landing, in Hamilton Township, Atlantic County, New Jersey, United States. Opened in 1987, the two-story enclosed mall is anchored by Macy's. The former Sears and JCPenney are closed. (Sears and JCPenney were at the Shore Mall [now Harbor Square] prior to 1987).

The mall is adjacent to the Black Horse Pike (U.S. Route 322) and U.S. Route 40, and is close to the Atlantic City Expressway and Atlantic City, making it a high tourist destination for vacationers there. The mall has a gross leasable area of 1,028,500 sq ft (95,550 m^{2}).

The mall has space for more than 140 stores, making it the largest mall in southeastern New Jersey. An Olive Garden, Red Lobster, Longhorn Steakhouse, and Buffalo Wild Wings are all located on pad sites on the outskirts of the parking lot. In 2017, the mall had a value of $90.78 million, which was reduced to $75 million in 2018. As of 2025, the Hamilton Mall has seen a decline in foot traffic, alongside an increase in vacancy rate.

== History ==
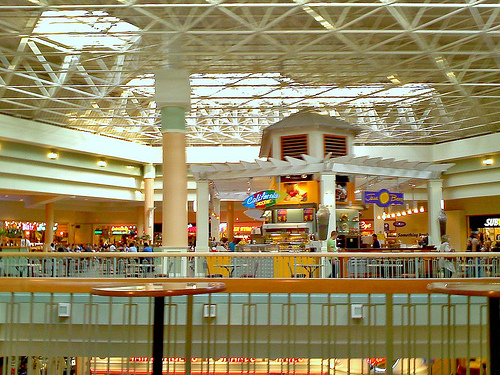
The Hamilton Mall food court in June 2010

Construction on the $100 million Hamilton Mall began in November 1985 by Kravco Company (now Kravco Company LLC) and JCP Realty Inc., the development arm of JCPenney, just south of the Atlantic City Racetrack. The mall, which was built on a 104-acre (0.42 km^{2}) tract that were former entrance roads and overflow parking for the race course, eventually opened in September 1987. The Macy's store opened shortly after, marked by a ribbon-cutting ceremony hosted by Miss America 1984, Suzette Charles and television personality Robin Leach. Mall entitlements included provisions for four department stores, one of which was never built. The Macy's was originally supposed to be a Bamberger's until Macy's renamed the stores in 1986. JCPenney and Sears moved from the nearby Shore Mall.

In August 1989, a small strip mall, dubbed the "Convenience Center", opened on the north side of the mall property adjacent to the racetrack. In 1991, Red Lobster opened on the outskirts of the mall parking lot. Olive Garden opened on a pad site in the parking lot in 1995.

=== Renovations ===
In 2004, the Hamilton Mall received an $8 million common area renovation. The renovation included the removal of several fountains, trees and planters, and a carousel located near the mall's main entrance. These changes allowed room for more kiosks and new lounge areas featuring soft seating and TVs. The large elevated seating area and planters in the food court were removed to make way for more seating and spaces for tenants in the center. The renovation also included new flooring, lighting, signage, and color scheme.

Between 2004 and 2009, the Hamilton Mall and its stores embarked on an extensive energy conservation program to reduce electrical consumption. Nearly every store changed its overhead lighting to new energy conserving fixtures. In 2009, a new carousel and a new children's play area opened on the first floor of Hamilton Mall.

In early 2013, Buffalo Wild Wings and Longhorn Steakhouse opened at Hamilton Mall on pad sites facing Black Horse Pike. A two-story expansion incorporating H&M and Forever 21 opened on the north side of the mall in mid-2013, in the location of the former "ghost" anchor. Also in 2013, the food court underwent a renovation, which included removal of the center kiosk (built as part of the mall's 2003 renovation) to provide visibility to surrounding stores, raising the ceiling height, and installing new paint, seating, flatscreen TVs and a boardwalk-inspired floor design. The mall's central plant chillers and cooling tower were replaced with newer highly efficient technology. The redevelopment also included the construction of a new public transit hub serving 169 buses per day, over one mile of new pedestrian sidewalks on site, extensive new landscaping, site-wide repaving, and improvements to five stormwater basins.

=== Store closures ===
On August 22, 2018, it was announced that Sears would be closing as part of a plan to close 46 stores nationwide. The store closed on November 25, 2018. On February 28, 2019, it was announced that JCPenney would also be closing on July 5, 2019 as part of a plan to close 27 stores nationwide which left Macy's as the sole anchor. In November 2019, discount department store Shoppers World opened in the first floor of the shuttered JCPenney.

In 2019, the Hamilton Township Office of Economic Development designated the Hamilton Mall as an area in need of redevelopment; the mall lost over $40 million in value since 2017. Despite losing two anchors and some chain stores, the mall largely survived the retail apocalypse, due in part to the mall's increasing number of independently-owned specialty businesses and non-retail tenants, as well as being the only enclosed mall in both Atlantic and Cape May Counties.

In July 2019, Kravco sold the mall to Namdar Realty Group, a Great Neck, New York-based commercial real estate firm that specializes in distressed shopping malls.

In August 2021, Shoppers World announced that it would be closing permanently in fall 2021 after two years of operation in the former JCPenney space, which would leave Macy's as the sole anchor in the mall.

In May 2024, signs announcing the arrival of Home Living Furniture have gone up in the mall-side windows. The regional chain has existing stores across the Mid-Atlantic area, including two in New Jersey in Howell and Eatontown. They officially opened in July 2024.

As of 2025, the Hamilton Mall has seen a decline in foot traffic, alongside an increase in vacancy rate.
