= SEPTA Route 103 =

Southeastern Pennsylvania Transportation Authority bus route

Route 103
- Ardmore to 69th Street Transit Center

Overview
- System: Victory District
- Operator: SEPTA Suburban Transit Division
- Began service: 1902 (streetcar); 1966 (bus)

Route
- Locale: Philadelphia metropolitan area
- Communities served: Brookline, Overbrook Park
- Start: Ardmore (Suburban Square)
- End: 69th Street Transit Center
- Daily ridership: 1,362 (FY 2019)
- Annual patronage: 428,432 (FY2019)
- Timetable: Route 103 schedule

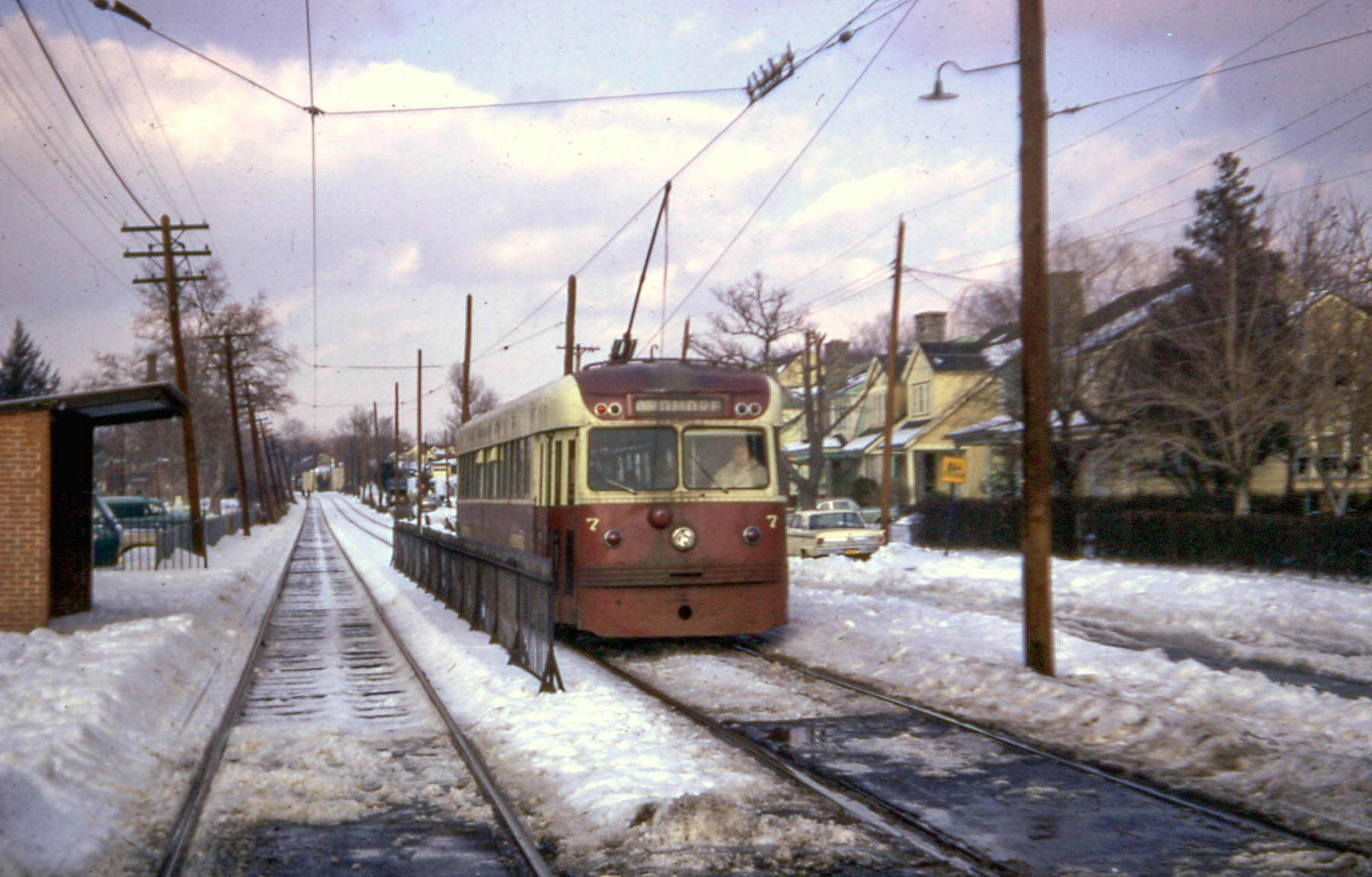
Red Arrow streetcar on route 103 in 1966

Route 103 is a bus route operated by the Southeastern Pennsylvania Transportation Authority (SEPTA) on the outskirts of Philadelphia, Pennsylvania, United States. Route 103 runs between Ardmore and the 69th Street Transit Center in Upper Darby.

It began as a streetcar line in 1902, operated by the Ardmore and Llanerch Street Railway, then the Philadelphia Suburban Transportation Company (PSTC, doing business as Red Arrow Lines) until converted bus operation to December 1966. SEPTA acquired PSTC and assumed operations of the Red Arrow Lines in January 1970. The now extinct trolley line led to the development of the first planned communities in Haverford Township, namely the streetcar suburbs of Llanerch, Brookline, and Oakmont.

== Route description ==
Map of former trolley (now bus) Routes 103 and 104 (orange), as well as existing trolley Routes 101 and 102 (red), and Route 100 (blue)

The route begins at a loop around Suburban Square shopping center in Ardmore, then heads west along Montgomery Avenue. A short distance later, it turns left at Woodside Road, crossing under the Paoli/Thorndale Line near Ardmore (SEPTA station), which also serves Amtrak's Keystone Service. After its stint on Woodside, it takes a left onto Lancaster Avenue. While Route 103 is close to the Ardmore station in this area, it doesn't have a direct connection to the station aside from a walk across the parking lot near the station at Suburban Square.

From Lancaster Avenue, Route 103 is divided. Southbound buses use Rittenhouse Place, East Athens Avenue, and Cricket Avenue to County Line Road. Northbound buses from County Line Road use Ardmore Avenue to Lancaster Avenue. Shortly after the split between Lancaster Avenue and County Line Roads, Route 103 makes a turn onto a private Ardmore Busway, also known as Hathaway Lane, where it immediately encounters County Line Road station, which is little more than a shed. The private busway was originally right-of way for the trolley rails until it was paved over, which is why some of the old P&W/Red Arrow Line sheds still remain intact. The exception to this is the plexiglass bus shelter at Belmont Avenue station.

Although Hathaway Lane continues to serve as a private road strictly for the Route 103 bus south of Haverford Road, there are some sections that contain parallel roads for residents and the general public. Both the busway and West Hathaway Lane go under the M at Ardmore Junction station. Merwood Road station contains residential parallel roads on both sides of the busway.

Though the Ardmore Busway ends at the intersection of Darby Road & Eagle Road in Oakmont, a "Red Arrow" bus shelter can be found after the intersection on Darby Road. The former trolley right-of-way runs west of Darby Road while the current bus route runs down Darby until making a left turn at Brookline Boulevard in Havertown. From there, the bus heads east and makes a right turn onto Earlington Road as it runs south again through Penfield. When Earlington Road ends at Township Line Road the bus turns left then heads up to 77th Street. It then turns right onto 77th Street, entering the Philadelphia city limits.

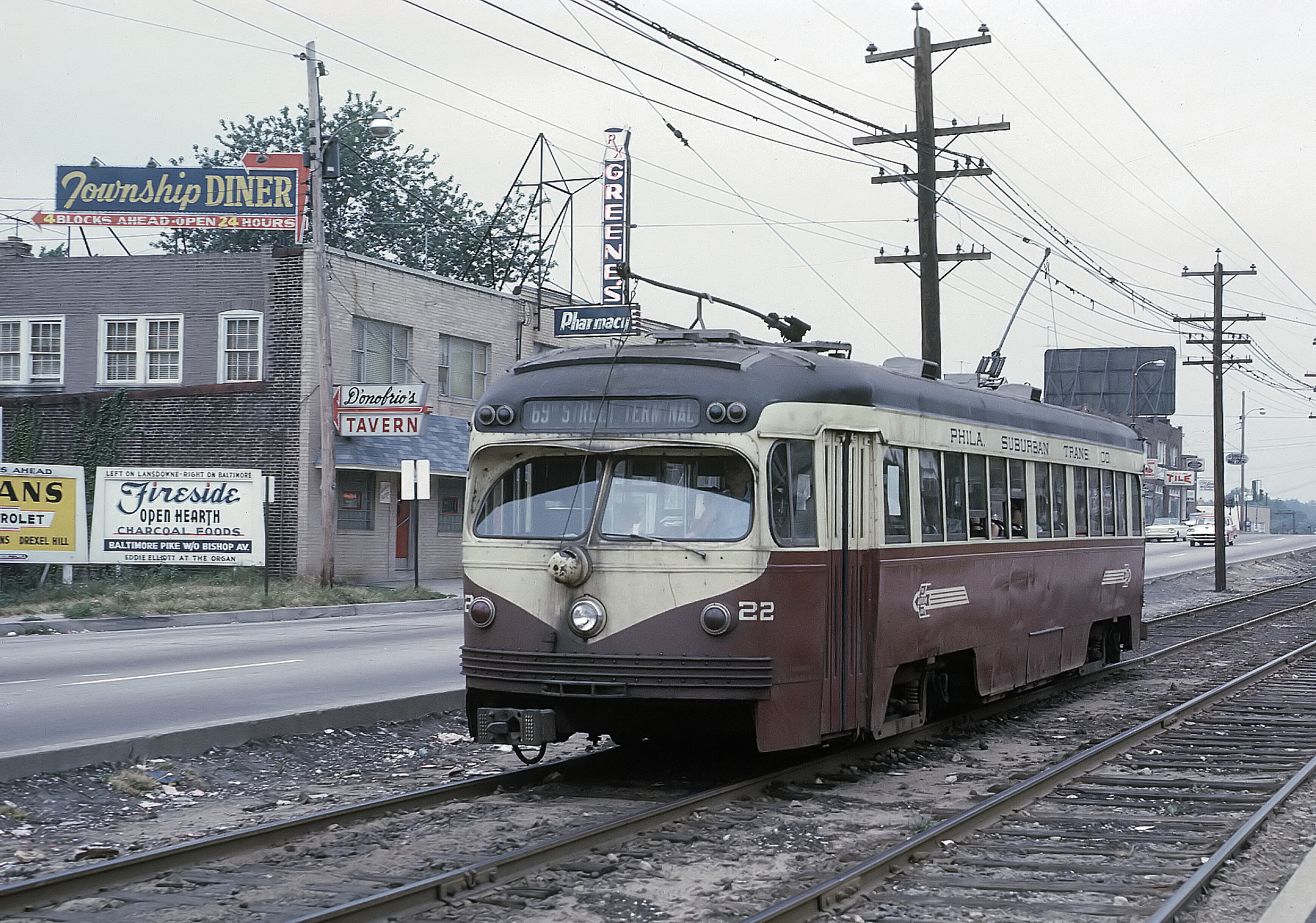
Route 103 trolley on West Chester Pike in 1964

Route 103 then turns left onto Woodbine Avenue, then a right onto 75th Street. It then travels down that street for about 4 blocks, then buses merge into Lansdowne Avenue before making a quick left onto Cardington Road/Victory Avenue. Buses then make a left onto a private SEPTA access road to terminate at the north terminal of 69th Street Transit Center.

== History ==
The PRR saw trolleys as a threat and fought hard to prevent them from expanding into Lower Merion. The PRR even tried to buy some of route of the Philadelphia and Lancaster Turnpike to prevent trolleys from expanding on the road; however, these efforts were not enough to prevent the Ardmore trolley from being built in 1902 by the Ardmore and Llanerch Street Railway Company. The trolley began operating on May 29, 1902. The last trolley ran on December 29, 1966.

A portion of the line from Eagle Road in Oakmont was paved over and used only for buses as a "busway". It was the first busway in North America and possibly the world. The Red Arrow also purchased old crossing gates from a Chicago area interurban railway and placed them perpendicular to the busway so as to not allow cars onto the busway. It outfitted the busses with remote radio control so the drivers could raise the gates and go through. These gates were placed at each end of the busway and at each road crossing and started service in March 31, 1967. The bus maintained the same stopping locations at the former trolley. On January 29, 1970 the route was purchased by SEPTA and the gates continued to be used until being left in the up position and eventually removed.

Route 103 buses took over SEPTA Route 105 routing from 77th Street & City Avenue to 69th Street Transit Center in the early 2000s. Before then, the route merged West Chester Pike where it joined its counterpart Route 104 (West Chester Trolley Line), another Red Arrow Bus Lines converted from trolleys in 1954. The two routes together. A mural of a trolley station was painted on a building on the corner where this right-of-way used to exist and was also the site of the Battle of Llanerch which was a physical and legal confrontation between trackworkers from the PRR and the West Chester Rail Company. From this point both the Routes 103 and 104 buses and trolleys continued eastward along West Chester Pike until reaching the west terminal at 69th Street. Today the North Terminal is also served by four other SEPTA bus routes; 30, 65, 105, 123. The west terminal continues to serve trolleys today; the Media–Sharon Hill Line, a former trolley line of the Philadelphia Suburban Transportation Company.

In October 2022, SEPTA proposed moving bus service off of the Route 103 busway as part of Bus Revolution, SEPTA's bus network redesign. On-street service would instead be provided via Eagle Road, Haverford Road, and Ardmore Avenue. The future of the busway was unspecified. On March 23, 2023, SEPTA released a new draft plan for Bus Revolution, in which Route 103 would be merged with Route 115 to serve the Philadelphia International Airport. The final plan, approved on May 23, 2024, replaced Route 103 with parts of Routes 105, 115, and 126; Route 115 would use the busway.

== See also ==
- Railroad bus
