= Suburban Square =

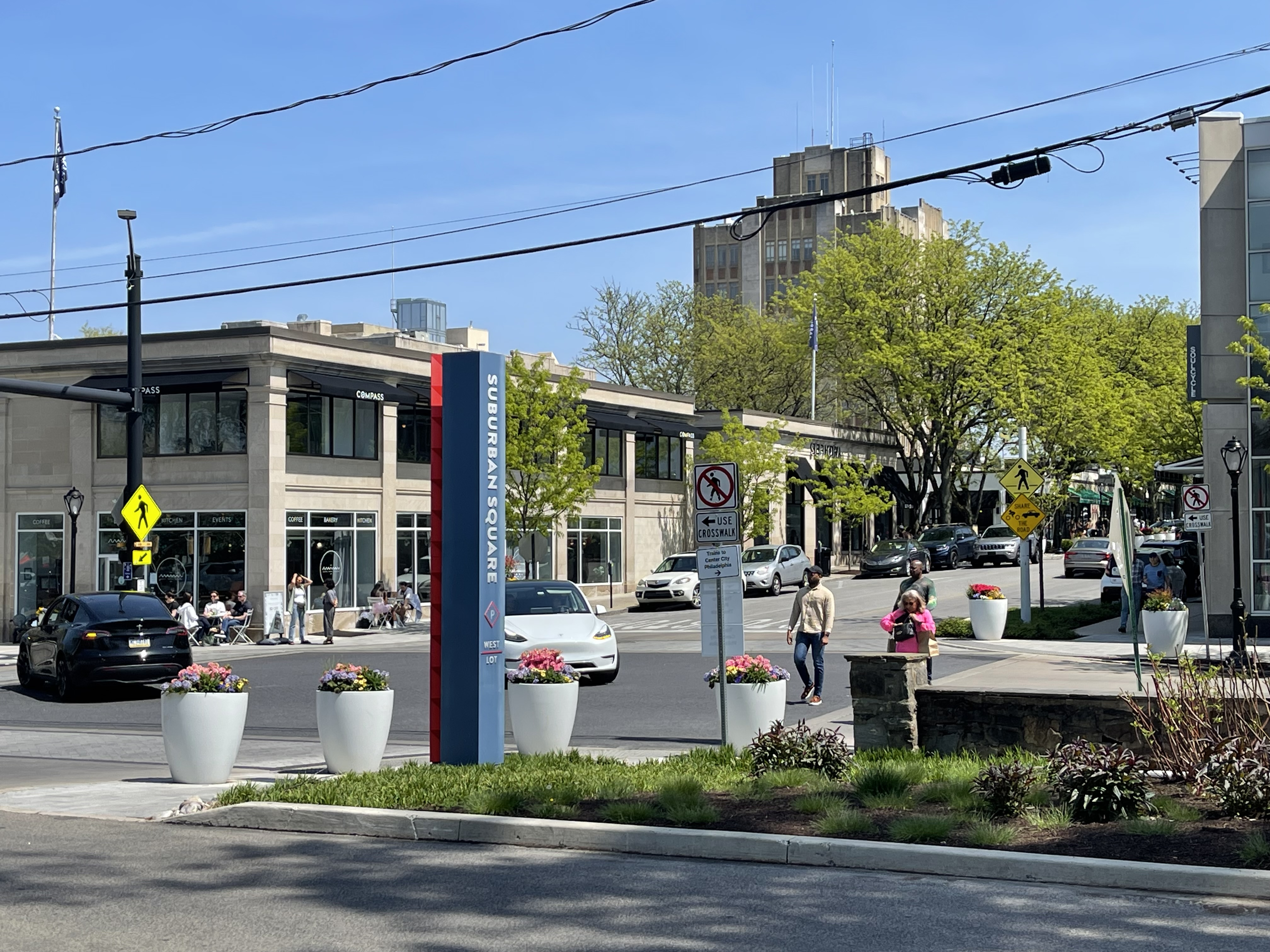
- Suburban Square entrance from Anderson Avenue in 2024
- Location: Ardmore, Pennsylvania
- Coordinates: 40°00′30″N 75°17′17″W
- Opened: 1928
- Manager: Kimco Realty
- Owner: Kimco Realty
- Num. of stores: 60+
- Floor area: 355,000 square feet (33,000 m^{2})
- Parking: 1 parking lot, 1 garage, and street parking
- Public transit: Amtrak and SEPTA RR at Ardmore station; SEPTA City Bus: 44; SEPTA Suburban Bus: 103
- Website: suburbansquare.com

Suburban Square is a community shopping center in Ardmore, Pennsylvania, United States, in the Main Line suburbs of Philadelphia. it has 355,000-square-foot (33,000 m^{2}) of gross leasable area. The center opened in 1928, and is notable as one of the earliest planned suburban shopping centers in the United States.

It has also been generally credited as being the first suburban shopping center to include a true department store, when Strawbridge & Clothier opened a four-story, 50,000 sq ft (4,600 m^{2}) branch there on May 12, 1930.

The site has grown from its original 7 acres (28,000 m^{2}) to 18 acres (73,000 m^{2}) since its launch. The complex currently includes Suburban Square, Times Building, and the adjacent Ardmore Farmers Market and features more than sixty retail and dining establishments.

== Description ==
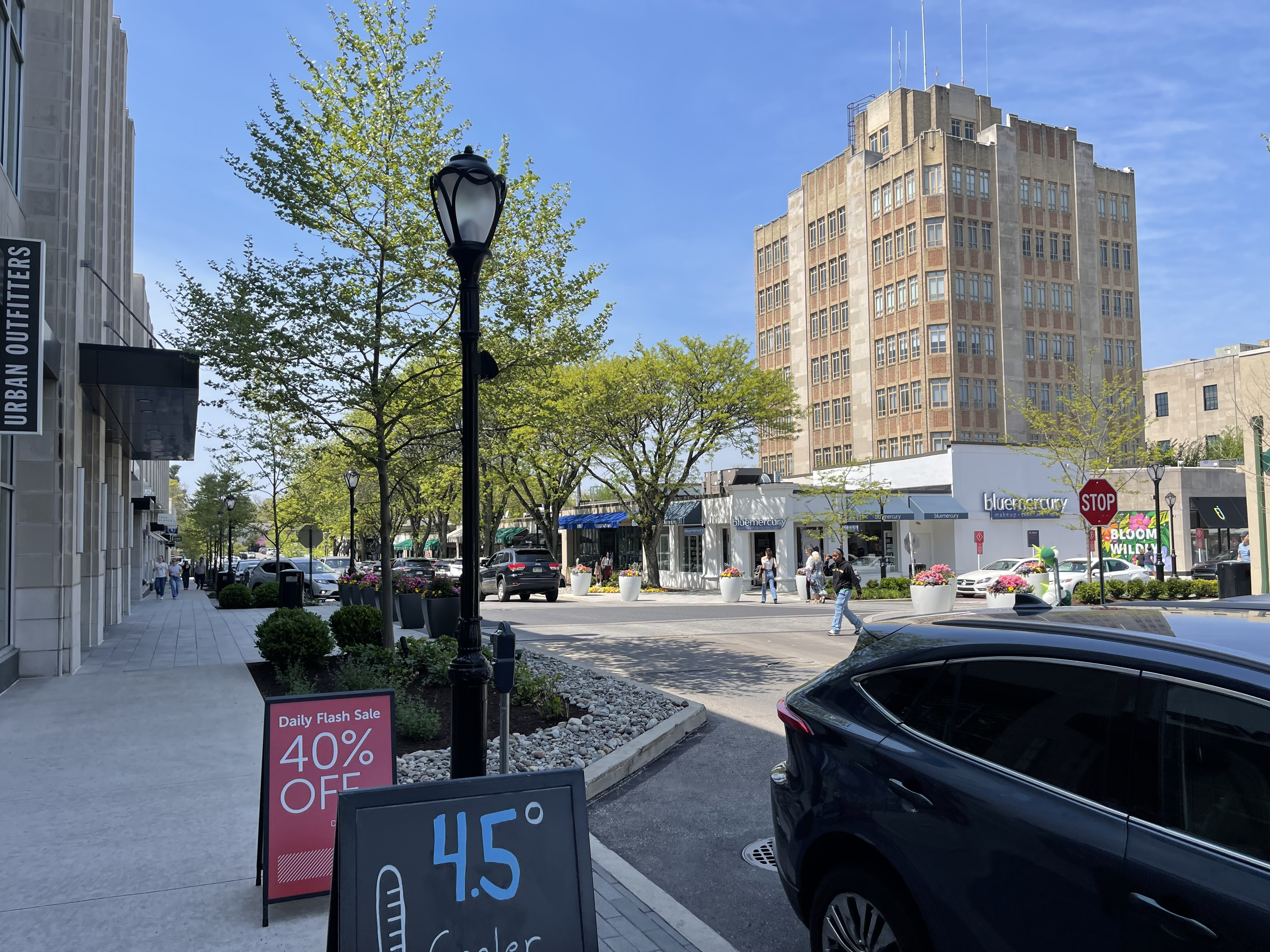
Coulter Avenue

A number of shopping centers have made claims to be the "first" shopping center (depending on the definition used) in the United States, including Roland Park Shopping Center (1907) in Baltimore, Suburban Square and Country Club Plaza in Kansas City, Missouri (1923). Roland Park was much smaller than Suburban Square, consisting of one building with six shops. Country Club Plaza, however, was on a larger scale — launching with 14 shops in 1923 and growing in the years following over 55 acres – and it launched five years earlier than Suburban Square (1923 vs. 1928). Suburban Square's "first" is as the first suburban shopping center to include a true department store, when Strawbridge & Clothier opened there on May 12, 1930. Notably, architect Frederick Dreher's design called for "a cluster of shops built around a major department store, with a supermarket, movie theater and office buildings with ample parking space."

Early 1970s editions of the Guinness Book of World Records listed Suburban Square as the "first shopping center" however, later editions of Guinness (since 1979) list Roland Park.

== History ==
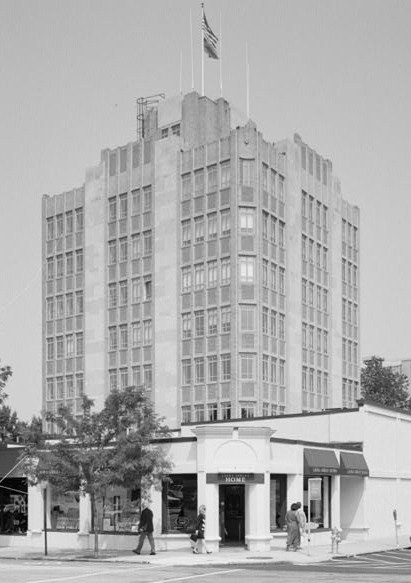
The Times-Medical Building

Planning for the center started in 1926, when work by architectural firm of Dreher and Churchman began, and construction commenced in 1927. The original (and rarely used) name was "Hestobeen Square", a combination of three of the developers' names. It was renamed in a 1936 contest as "Suburban Square".

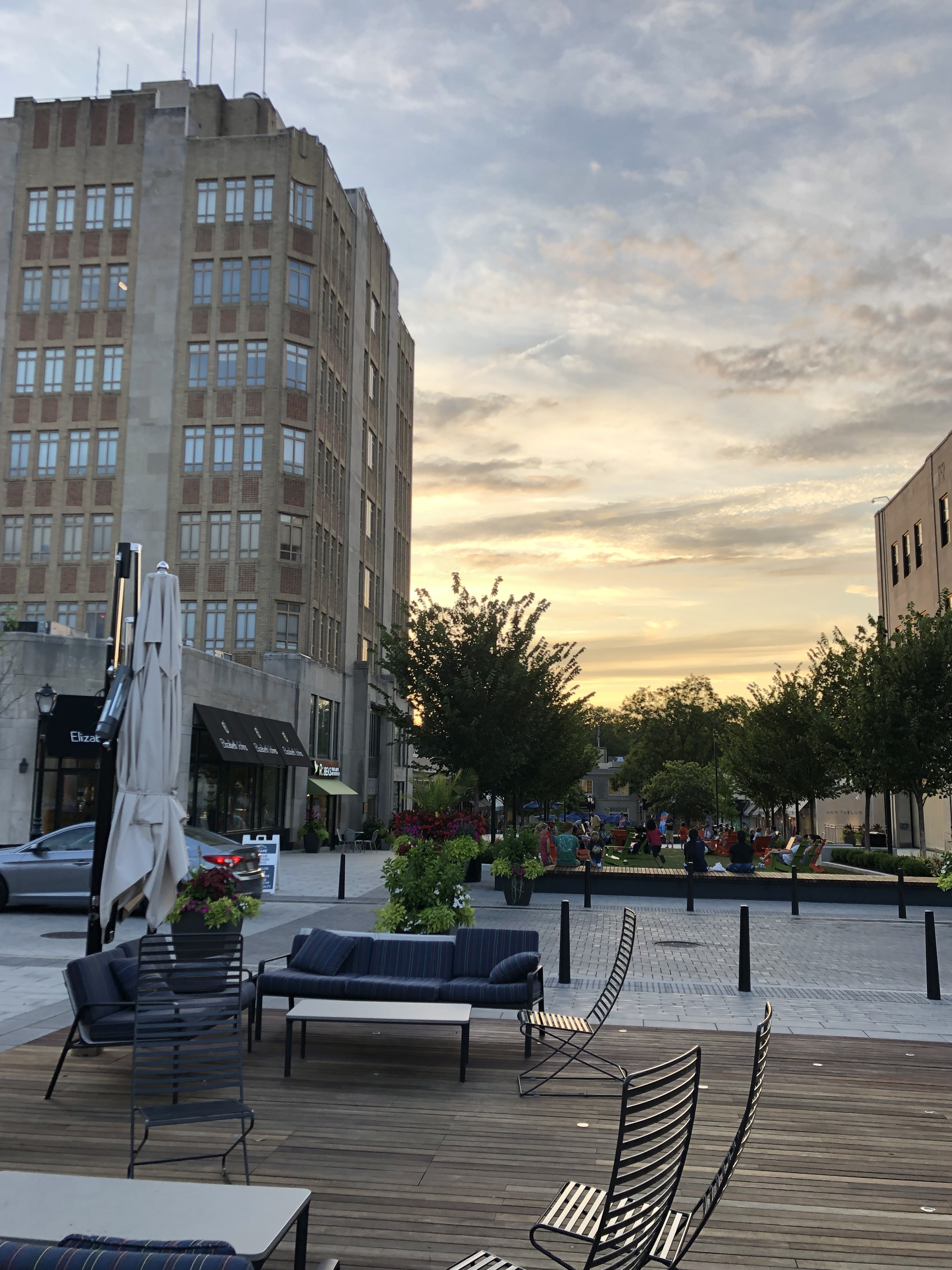
St. James Place with central pedestrian only section near Life Time Fitness

As noted above, the Strawbridge's branch opened in 1930, was among the few in a first wave of suburban branches of big downtown department stores in the U.S., preceded only by Nugents in Uptown St. Louis (1913), and in the 1920s Filene's (Boston area, suburban boutiques), B. H. Dyas Hollywood and Bullocks Wilshire (Los Angeles, full branches), and Marshall Field's (Chicago, full branches). Strawbridge's suburban stores (here and in Jenkintown) were the last such suburban branches of downtown department stores until after World War Two.

The original Strawbridge's was converted to Macy's in 2006. The Macy's would eventually close in March 2016. In early 2017, it was announced that the former Macy's store would be replaced by health club Life Time Fitness and furniture retailer West Elm by the end of the year.
