= Concord Mall (Delaware) =

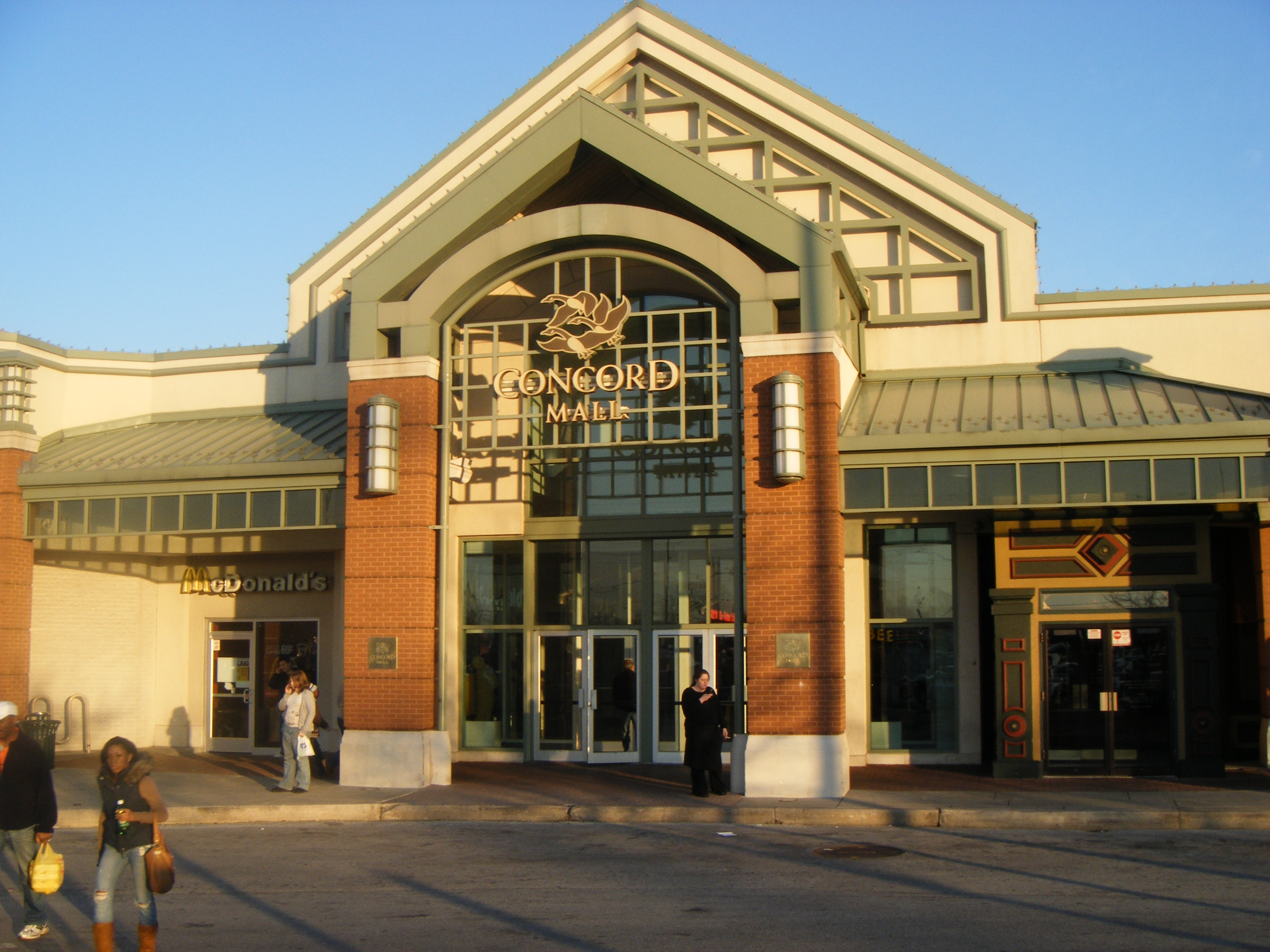
- North entrance on west side of mall
- Location: Brandywine Hundred, Delaware, United States
- Coordinates: 39.8228°N 75.5441°W
- Address: 4737 Concord Pike
- Opened: March 11, 1969 (enclosed mall)
- Developer: Rubenstein Company
- Manager: Namdar Realty Group
- Owner: Namdar Realty Group
- Num. of stores: 90+ at peak; 27 as of 2026
- Num. of anchor tenants: 4 (2 open, 2 vacant)
- Floor area: 803,944 square feet (74,689 m^{2})
- Floors: 1 (2 in Boscov's, Macy's, and former Sears; 3 in former Macy's Home)
- Parking: Parking lot
- Public transit: DART First State bus: 2
- Website: concordmall.com

Concord Mall is a shopping mall located north of the city of Wilmington in the unincorporated Brandywine Hundred area along U.S. Route 202. It is Delaware's third-largest shopping mall. A short distance south of the Pennsylvania border, it attracts shoppers from Pennsylvania and other neighboring states wishing to take advantage of tax-free shopping in Delaware. At its peak, the mall held approximately 95 stores. The mall's anchor tenants are Macy's and Boscov's. The mall is owned by Namdar Realty Group.

== Location ==
The Concord Mall is located in an unincorporated area of northern New Castle County, Delaware, north of the city of Wilmington, one mile (1.6 km) south of the Pennsylvania border. The mall is situated in a retail corridor along U.S. Route 202 (Concord Pike) between Wilmington and the Pennsylvania border. The Concord Mall is just south of the intersection between U.S. 202 and Delaware Route 92 (Naamans Road). Concord Mall is served by DART First State bus route 2, which provides service to Wilmington via Concord Pike.

== Description ==
Concord Mall has a gross leasable area of 803,944 square feet (74,689 m^{2}). As of 2025, the mall contains approximately 40 retail tenants. The mall is anchored by a 175,065-square-foot (16,264 m^{2}) Boscov's and a 150,000-square-foot (14,000 m^{2}) Macy's. Until early 2026, the mall included a 52,000-square-foot (4,800 m^{2}) Macy's Home and a 20,000-square-foot (1,900 m^{2}) H&M. There is also a vacant 174,172-square-foot (16,181 m^{2}) space last occupied by Sears. Smaller stores in the mall include Victoria's Secret, Foot Locker, and rue21. Dining options at the mall include Chick-fil-A, Cafe Riviera, and China Express. An adjacent strip mall includes Ulta Beauty, Sprouts Farmers Market, and Best Buy.

== History ==
=== 1963-1967: Early plans and Almart ===
A mall was first proposed at this location in 1963. The original plan referred to the mall as Devonshire Square, with a projected opening in the summer of 1964. At that time, developers hadn't decided whether the mall would be enclosed or open-air. Those plans failed to materialize, but a similar development would follow soon after.

The Concord Mall, developed by the Rubenstein Company, would ultimately be built over several phases on the 57-acre (23 ha) site.

In April 1965, Allied Stores announced that a stand-alone, 120,000-square-foot (11,000 m^{2}) Almart discount department store would be constructed at the site of the future Concord Mall. The store opened on March 17, 1966. It was described as having "hand-painted mural designs" on its walls, and included a restaurant called the Fife and Drum.

=== 1968-1969: Opening the mall ===
In March 1968, Rubenstein announced the start of construction on an enclosed mall to connect with the existing Almart department store. Designed by the Philadelphia-based architectural firm Evantash and Friedman, the mall would house 29 stores and cover 157,000 square feet (14,600 m^{2}). Construction was expected to cost $950,000. The climate-controlled mall would also include decorative fountains, planters, and seating areas.

Later that year, plans were also announced to add a strip shopping center next to Almart, which would house a movie theater and a Pathmark grocery store.

On March 11, 1969, the enclosed mall officially opened, making it the first enclosed mall in New Castle County. Newspaper reports described the mall's interior: "The central area of the Mall has a tall summer house surrounded by greenery and features a two-faced clock that can be seen from part of the Mall." Another report mentioned the mall's "garden atmosphere", complete with fountains and "living shrubs".

The mall opened with 25 stores and two restaurants. Notable opening-day stores included Thrift Drug, Kennard's Department Store, and a 30,000-square-foot (2,800 m^{2}) Woolworth. The Woolworth's also included a Harvest House restaurant.

Discussing the new mall and its possible effects on downtown Wilmington, a News Journal columnist wrote: "The Concord Mall is six miles from downtown, and nearly impossible to reach by public transportation. It will bring more traffic to a section of the Concord Pike that was already carrying 22,000 vehicles per day before the mall opened. [...] While the Concord Mall deserves congratulations for being the first to bring a new amenity to New Castle County, it still isn't time to count Wilmington out."

=== 1970s: Expansion ===
The Concord Mall Cinema opened on February 11, 1970, located in a separate building on the north side of the mall. The theater—featuring 850 "rocking chair" seats—was part of the Budco chain, which also owned Cinema 141 near Wilmington.

In November 1970, a 60,000-square-foot (5,600 m^{2}) professional office building opened, which would eventually connect to the mall via a side corridor.

In November 1971, the mall announced a major expansion project. A two-level Pomeroy's Department Store would be constructed to anchor a new wing of the mall. The project would also add 35 smaller stores, doubling the length of the mall corridor to over 1,000 feet (300 m). A decorative fountain would be added to the new Pomeroy's court.

The new addition opened on March 9, 1972, with stores gradually opening over the months that followed. The addition brought numerous national chains to the mall, including Waldenbooks, GNC, Radio Shack, and Spencer Gifts, along with a Friendly's Restaurant. The mall's total leasable area increased to 650,000 square feet (60,000 m^{2}) after construction was complete.

The 180,000-square-foot (17,000 m^{2}) Pomeroy's store opened on October 6, 1972. Pomeroy's and Almart were both owned by Allied Stores. While Almart was considered a discount store, Pomeroy's was a traditional full-line department store. The Concord Mall location included a restaurant and a "homemade" candy department. At its opening, Pomeroy's was believed to be the largest store in Delaware.

After the opening of Pomeroy's, the Concord Mall became Delaware's first "regional" mall. By 1974, the Concord Mall housed a total of 70 shops and restaurants. The mall thrived on out-of-state shoppers from Pennsylvania, due to its close proximity to the state line, and Delaware's lack of both sales tax and the "blue laws" that prohibited many stores in Pennsylvania from operating on Sundays.

=== 1980s: Anchor store changes ===
In April 1979, Allied Stores sold their Almart division to rival Montgomery Ward. By mid-1980, Montgomery Ward had converted the Concord Mall Almart location to their new discount brand, known as Jefferson Ward. The store was gradually renovated in 1981, with work completed by June.

The Concord Mall Cinema was converted to a twin-screen theater in 1980.

In 1982, Philadelphia-based Strawbridge & Clothier announced that it would build a new store at the Concord Mall, relocating from an existing location at the Merchandise Mart shopping center in Wilmington. The store would be built in front of the mall's center entrance—replacing much of the mall's front parking lot, and extending nearly to U.S. 202.

Kennard's, a local Delaware-based department store, was forced to close its Concord Mall location later that year. Its prime spot at the mall's center court was then cleared to make room for the new Strawbridge's wing. Kennard's claimed the mall refused to negotiate a new lease for a smaller location at the mall. Mark Rubenstein, the mall's developer, contended that Kennard's was "not a strong tenant" and said, "We'd like them out."

Strawbridge & Clothier opened at the mall on August 11, 1983. The store, which cost $10 million to build, was designed by the Baltimore-based architectural firm RTKL Associates. The 150,000-square-foot (14,000 m^{2}) building was hailed for its distinctive and elegant modern design, emphasizing natural light.

In 1984, the Rubenstein Company sold the mall to Chicago-based JMB Realty Corp for $31.6 million.

During the summer of 1985, Bradlees acquired 18 Jefferson Ward stores in Pennsylvania, New Jersey, and Delaware, including the Concord Mall location. Bradlees officially replaced Jefferson Ward at the mall in early 1986.

Pomeroy's closed their store at the mall on January 31, 1987, due to a corporate takeover and subsequent reorganization. The location was then purchased by Boscov's, which opened in the fall of 1987 after a complete renovation. It became Boscov's 13th store, and their second in Delaware (following the Dover Mall).

Also in 1987, the mall's owners began to seriously consider plans to expand the mall. Management was concerned about increasing regional competition, as there were several proposals to build rival malls and shopping centers nearby. With no room to expand outward, the owners wanted to add a second floor to the mall instead, which would also include a food court.

In October 1988, JMB Realty said their plan to add a second floor to the mall had been shelved, and they would instead remodel the mall's interior, with the intention of completing work by the 1989 Christmas season. This renovation, however, also failed to materialize. By the summer of 1989, the mall owners had backtracked and were once again calling for a second-floor addition.

In the spring of 1988, Bradlees' parent company decided to close their entire southern division, including all four Delaware locations. After placing the stores up for sale, Bradlees announced that the Concord Mall location would permanently close by the summer of 1989.

=== 1990s: Expansion attempts and Renovations ===
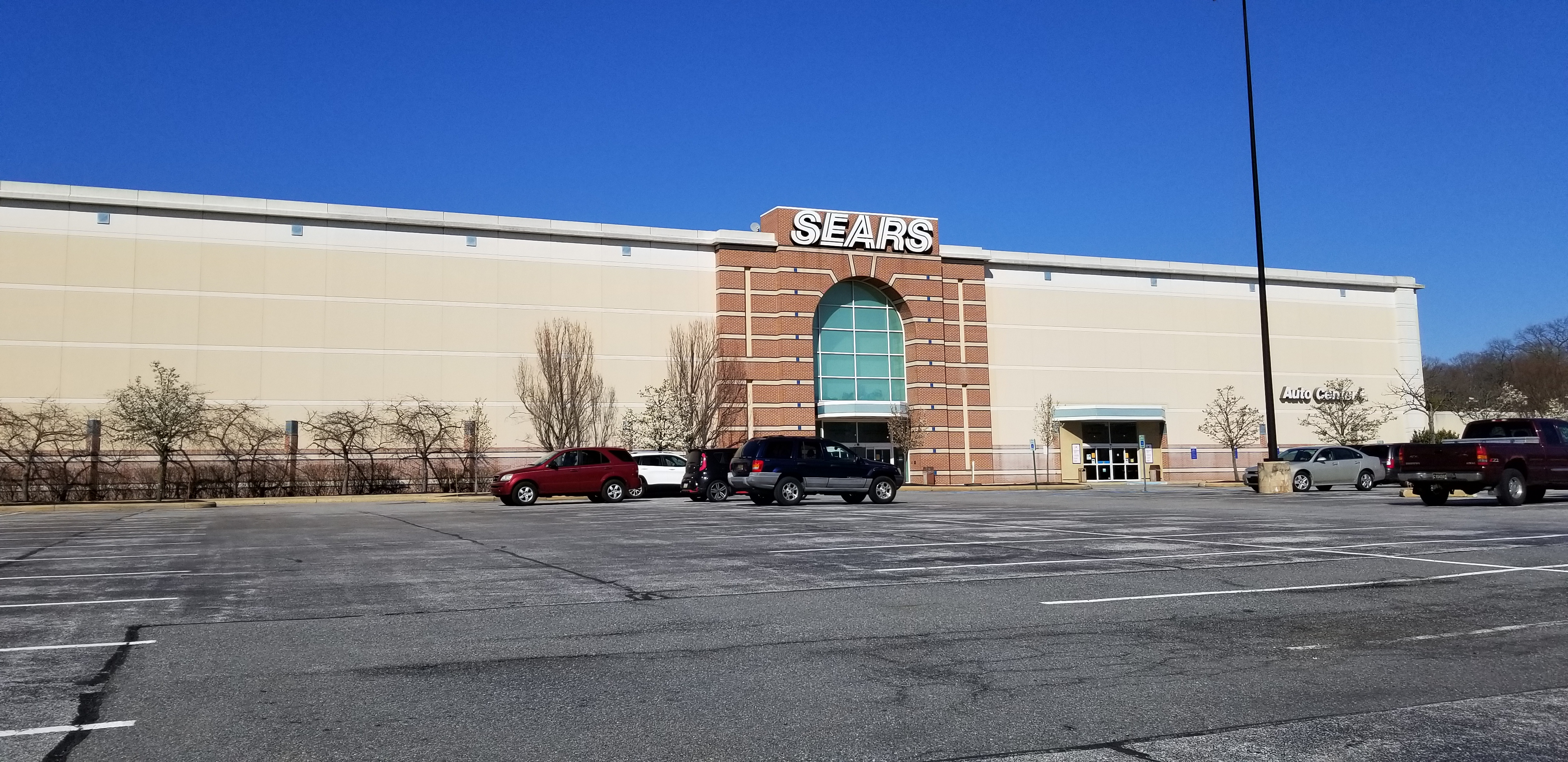
Sears at the Concord Mall in March 2020

In 1990, Sears announced they would be relocating from an aging store in downtown Wilmington to a newly built store at the Concord Mall, with construction set to begin in early 1991. Sears would completely raze the former Bradlees/Almart space and replace it with a modern store totaling 175,000 square feet (16,300 m^{2}).

JMB planned to add a second floor to the existing mall at the same time, along with two additional anchor tenants and four parking garages. The owners believed a major expansion was the only way to prevent the construction of a rival mall nearby. However, local residents were concerned about the scale of the project. Representatives from the state police were concerned about the potential for crime in the parking garages.

The county planning department rejected JMB's proposed addition in August 1991 for being too large, with the mall owners immediately appealing the decision. JMB argued their addition met all code requirements, and the county was obligated to approve it. By this time, the county had already approved plans for a new mall to be constructed at the former Brandywine Raceway along U.S. 202, just north of the Concord Mall.

The Concord Mall was located next to several residential neighborhoods, with only a fence separating the mall from nearby homes. Residents were hoping for a compromise that would allow the mall to expand, while adequately shielding their homes from light and noise. The mall later submitted a modified plan that widened the buffer area between the mall and residential areas. The plan was rejected again—for the fifth time—with county planning director Bryan Shuler writing that the mall's site "simply cannot physically accommodate a commercial development of the magnitude proposed."

A News Journal columnist wrote in April 1992 that changes were needed for the Concord Mall to survive. She noted that crowds at the mall had dropped significantly, and concluded, "Without a face-lift or some kind of makeover, there won't be a whole heck of a lot of incentive to go to Concord Mall."

Sears opened on September 22, 1992. The store, designed by Cope Linder Associates of Philadelphia, was a new prototype concept for the chain. The $10 million, two-story building was 43 feet (13 m) tall, with extra height included in the design to accommodate future expansion of the mall.

On September 1, 1993, the Concord Mall became the first mall in Delaware to ban smoking indoors. The mall used student "smoking patrollers" to hand out leaflets and chewing gum to anyone caught smoking during the first weeks of the ban.

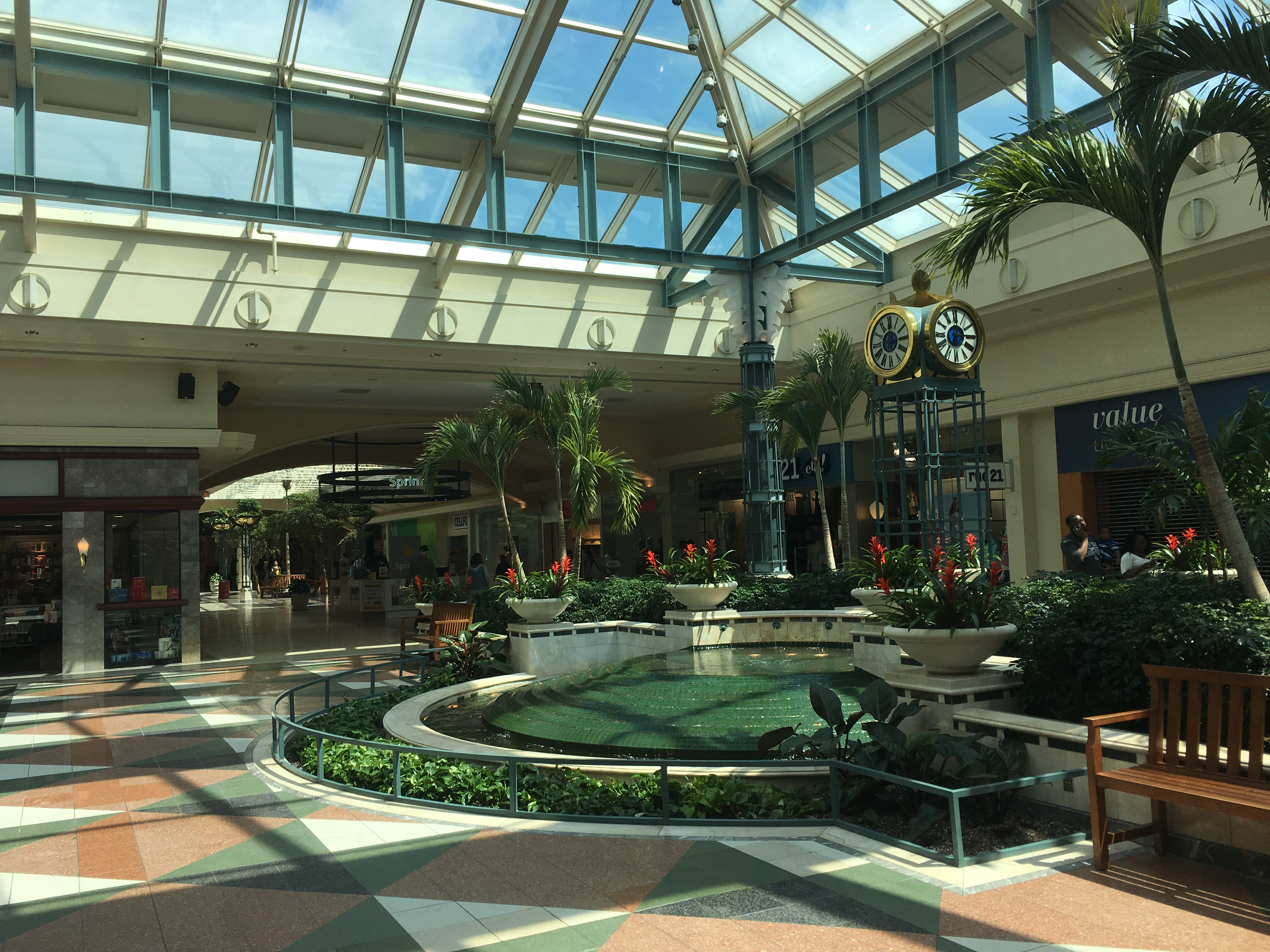
Fountain and clock tower in the Concord Mall center court

Early in 1994, JMB announced it was moving forward with a $10 million renovation of the existing mall, to be completed before the Christmas shopping season. The mall's new design, created by Cope Linder Associates, would feature redesigned entrances, marble floors, skylights, and a glass roof at center court. Work was completed on schedule by the end of November 1994. A large, tiered fountain, surrounded by planters and a clock tower, was added to the center court. Smaller fountains were added to the Boscov's and Sears courts. During the 1994 Christmas season, the mall reached a peak of 96 stores.

In 1995, Strawbridge & Clothier expanded its presence at the mall by adding a separate Home Furnishings store. The store took over the office building that had been built into the mall's 1972 expansion wing. Designers created the 54,000-square-foot (5,000 m^{2}) store by gutting the interior of the former office building, creating a new three-story atrium overlooking the mall. The store was designed to seamlessly blend with the mall's recently-completed renovation. The new Home Furnishings store, combined with a minor renovation of the mall's existing Strawbridge store, cost approximately $10 million.

In April 1996, Woolworth's announced that their Concord Mall store would close from May to August for extensive renovations, in order to test a prototype store design. The store reopened on August 27, 1996, featuring brighter lighting and wider aisles. Woolworth's eliminated unprofitable categories of merchandise and removed the traditional restaurant. Although business improved at the prototype stores, it wasn't enough to save the Woolworth's chain, which had been struggling for years. On July 17, 1997, Woolworth announced it was permanently closing all of its namesake variety stores, including the Concord Mall location.

Allied Retail Properties acquired the mall in 1998 for $80 million. At the time of sale, the Concord Mall held a 99% occupancy rate and ranked in the top 15% of malls nationwide in sales per square foot.

Barnes & Noble opened at the Concord Mall in November 1998, filling the space previously occupied by Pathmark. It was the chain's first store to open in Delaware.

The mall's movie theater—renamed the AMC Concord Mall after a 1987 merger—permanently closed on March 21, 1999. The theater had begun showing "art house" films in the early 1990s, and switched exclusively to art films following the opening of a 16-screen multiplex nearby. AMC opted not to renew their lease when it expired in 1999, as twin cinemas had fallen out of favor.

=== 2000s-2010s: Stability ===
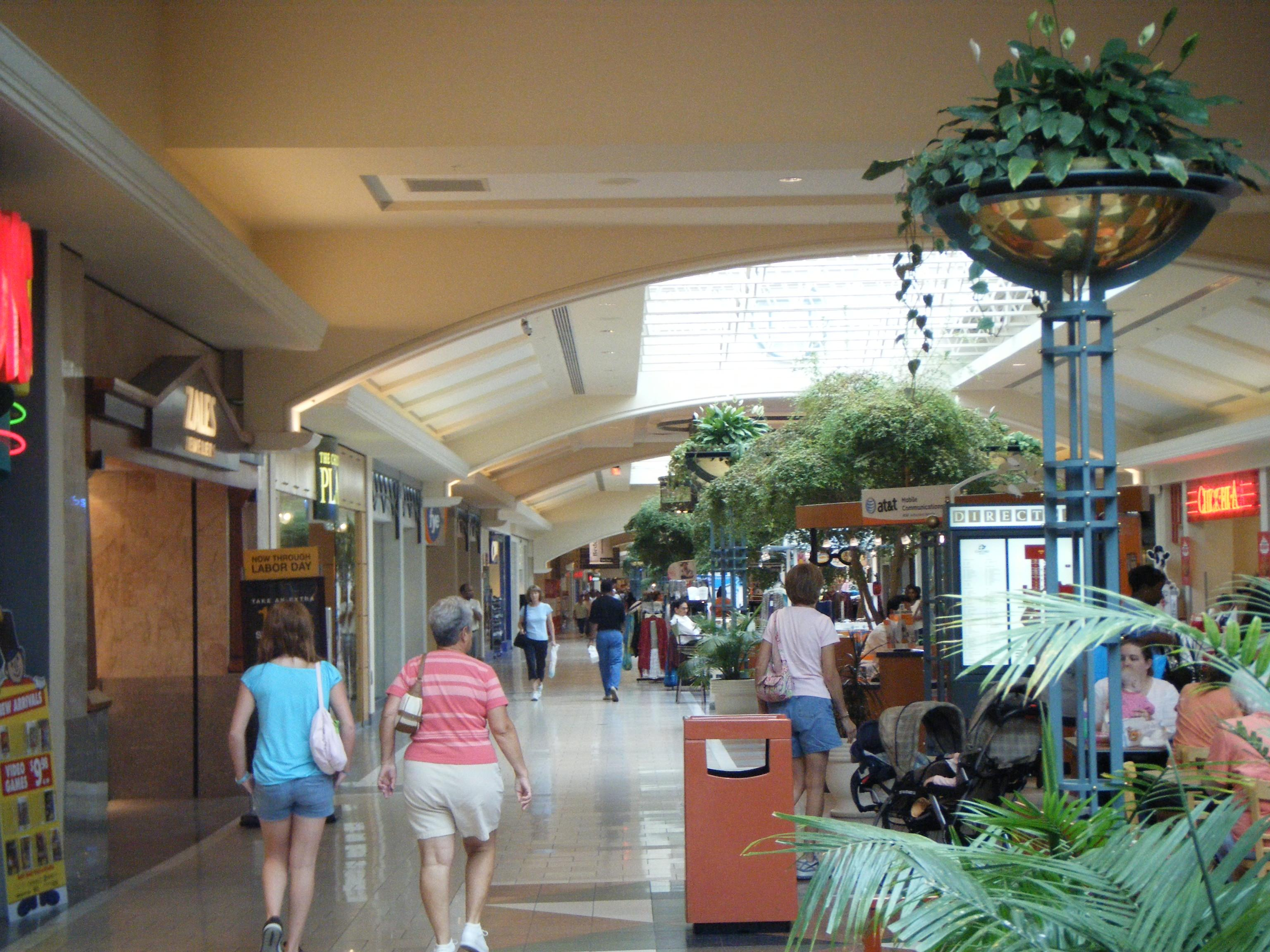
Concord Mall looking south from Boscov's in 2008

Following the 1994 renovation, the mall enjoyed a 25-year period of relative stability and success.

In 2000, Ulta Beauty and Best Buy filled the space vacated by the movie theater, joining Barnes & Noble in the mall's revamped strip center.

Swedish fast fashion retailer H&M opened a 20,000-square-foot (1,900 m^{2}) store on September 6, 2002, occupying most of the former Woolworth's space.

In 2005, Federated Department Stores purchased May Department Stores, the parent company of Strawbridge's. As a result of the merger, several Strawbridge's stores were converted to the Macy's brand. At the Concord Mall, the Strawbridge's and Strawbridge's Home Furnishings stores became Macy's and Macy's Home, respectively, in 2006.

As of 2016, the mall held 76 stores, with 9 vacancies.

=== 2020s: Decline ===
In July 2019, Barnes & Noble closed their store at the Concord Mall, relocating to a smaller space nearby at the Concord Square Shopping Center. The store was replaced by a Sprouts Farmers Market, which opened on March 11, 2020.

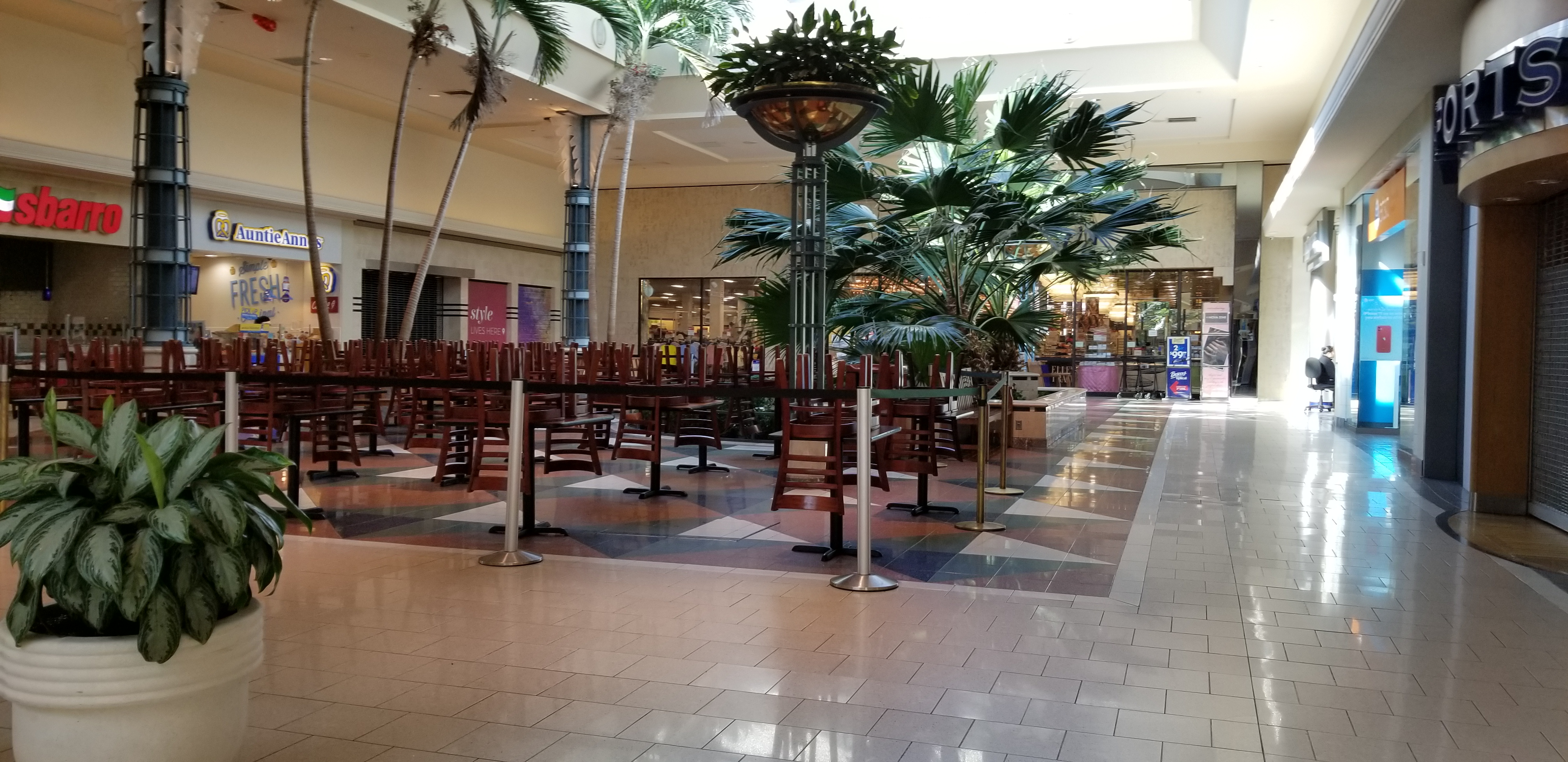
The Concord Mall food court during the COVID-19 pandemic in March, 2020.

In January 2020, with the mall at risk of foreclosure, Allied Properties sold the Concord Mall to Namdar Realty Group. By that time, the mall was suffering from a 30% vacancy rate, which was three times the national average.

On February 5, 2020, it was announced that Sears would be closing as part of a plan to shutter 31 stores nationwide. The store closed in April 2020. This was the last Sears location in Delaware.

The closure of Sears, along with the switch to online shopping during the pandemic, sharply accelerated the mall's decline.

Cafe Riviera, which had been operating at the mall since 1981, announced it would be closing in October 2020, due to pandemic-era challenges and difficulty negotiating a new lease with Namdar. However, following an outpouring of support from the community, the owners were able to reach an agreement for the restaurant to remain open at the mall.

In 2022, an abandoned Burger King restaurant inside the mall went viral after a mall employee posted a picture of its dining area on Facebook. The Burger King operated at the mall between 1987 and 2009. The restaurant, which was never refurbished, remained perfectly intact behind a temporary wall.

On February 23, 2024, the mall's Bonefish Grill restaurant closed, as part of a larger round of closings by the chain's parent company, Bloomin' Brands. The restaurant had been in business at the mall since 2014.

At the start of 2025, the mall contained approximately 40 tenants—a mix of local and national retailers, counter-service restaurants, and service businesses.

=== Demolition plans and future redevelopment ===
In March 2026, Abrams Realty & Development entered a contract to purchase the Concord Mall from Namdar, with the intention of redeveloping the property. Abrams was already working on a redevelopment project for the now-defunct Exton Square Mall, located just 16 miles (26 km) north.

By the summer of 2026, the Concord Mall had seen several additional retail closures, including the Macy's Home Store and H&M.

In August 2026, a permit application was filed with New Castle County to demolish most of the Concord Mall, including the Macy's department store, and replace it with a 233,100-square-foot (21,660 m^{2}) freestanding retail building. Only the Boscov's and former Sears structures would remain. Boscov's operates its store under a long-term land lease. The former Sears building is still owned by a Sears-related holding company and is not part of the sale.

Boscov's intends to remain open in their present location, stating "While the Concord Mall may disappear, Boscov's is here to stay and ready to serve you." According to Delaware Public Media, Boscov's has been outperforming Macy's at the mall, drawing nearly twice the number of monthly visitors.

Redevelopment and demolition plans must still be approved by New Castle County before any construction can begin. No date has been announced for the mall's closure.
