= Clover (store) =

Discount store chain

- Industry: Retail
- Founded: 1971
- Defunct: 1996
- Fate: Liquidation
- Headquarters: Cherry Hill, New Jersey, U.S.
- Products: Clothing, footwear, bedding, furniture, jewelry, beauty products, and housewares.
- Parent: Strawbridge & Clothier; May Department Stores

Clover was a discount chain of 26 stores operated by Strawbridge & Clothier in Pennsylvania, New Jersey, and Delaware. Clover stores averaged 80,000 sq ft (7,400 m^{2}), but the first five stores it opened ran about 95,000 sq ft (8,800 m^{2}) to 100,000 sq ft (9,300 m^{2}).

== History ==
The first Clover store opened in 1971 in Cherry Hill, New Jersey. The management of Strawbridge & Clothier based their Clover store format on Dayton Hudson's Target store chain and Federated's Gold Circle Discount store. The name was taken from S&C's periodic sale days, Clover Days. The similarities to Target were evident throughout the life of Clover. The earliest locations included a food store (Clovermarket) adjacent to the main store. S&C did not operate the food stores for long and they were converted to Acme or P.L.U.S. (an A&P no-frills format).

In 1978, Strawbridge & Clothier partnered with the Rouse Company developing two mini-malls next to their Cinnaminson and Center Square stores, that were called Clover Square. These had a mixture of national and regional chains and independent stores. The malls opened with a food court in one corner of the square-shaped corridor. These malls later became Outlet Square. Now, they are both supermarkets.

In 1995, May Department Stores purchased Strawbridge's. Kimco Realty Corporation paid $35.5 million for 23 Clover stores, leaving Strawbridge with three Clover sites. Kohl's subsequently purchased 5 Clover stores. Kimco liquidated the Clover stores and sold the buildings. Due to unfavorable lease agreements, the Clover stores located in Shore Mall in Egg Harbor Township, New Jersey and Penrose Plaza in Southwest Philadelphia were unable to be divested along with the rest of the chain. Gordon Brothers Partners, Inc. of Boston was retained to liquidate the 23 stores that were sold and to operate the remaining three stores through December 31, 1996.

Strawbridge's parent, May Department Stores, was sold to Federated Department Stores in 2006 and the Strawbridge's name was rebranded in favor of Macy's.

Clover was far ahead of its time with innovation, having one of the first automated push button customer service call systems in the early 1970s. Built by a long time Clover employee named Thomas Atkinson, customers in need of help pressed a button in the area they required assistance, triggering an alarm at the Customer Service Desk. The customer service associate then issued a store-wide page, summoning an associate to the location. If, by the third alarm, the system hadn't been reset by a responding associate, the service desk associate paged the store manager-on-duty, thereby guaranteeing the customer was assisted. Clover used full PLU lookup for both sale and regular merchandise and hand scanners before any other non-food retailer in the nation. Additionally, just before they closed, they began using a store management, receiving and distribution system that is the model for all big box chains in America today.

When Clover closed many of its stores were purchased by Kohl's, with its first major expansion to the east coast.
