= Strawbridge's =

Defunct department store chain

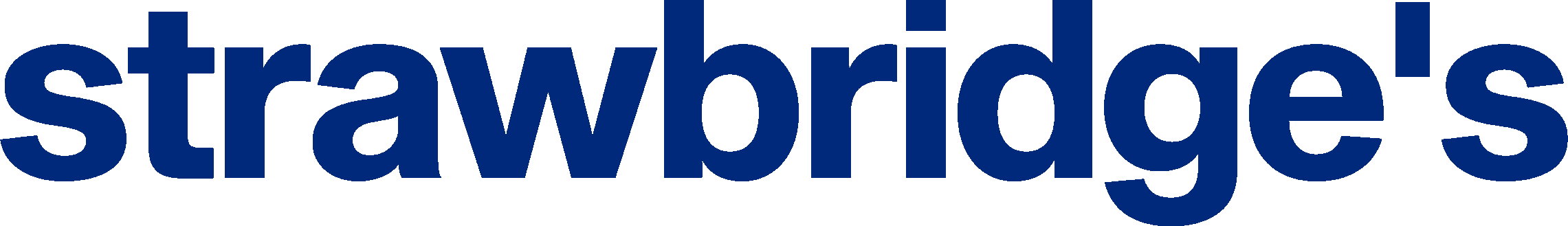
- Industry: Retail
- Founded: 1868 (as Strawbridge & Clothier)
- Defunct: September 9, 2006
- Fate: Acquired by Macy's, Inc.
- Successor: Macy's
- Headquarters: 8th and Market Streets, Philadelphia, Pennsylvania, U.S.
- Products: Clothing, footwear, bedding, furniture, jewelry, beauty products, and housewares.
- Parent: May Department Stores (1996-2005); Federated Department Stores (2005-2006)
- Website: Official website (2004 archive) at the Wayback Machine (archived 2004-06-30)

Strawbridge's, formerly Strawbridge & Clothier, was a department store in the northeastern United States, with stores in Pennsylvania, New Jersey, and Delaware. The Center City Philadelphia flagship store was, in its day, a gracious urban emporium. The retailer started adding branch stores starting in the 1930s and, by their zenith in the 1980s, enjoyed annual sales of over a billion dollars By the 1990s, Strawbridge's became part of the May Department Stores conglomerate until May's acquisition by Federated Department Stores on August 30, 2005.

May operated the Strawbridge's stores under the Northern Virginia-based Hecht's Department Store division. On February 1, 2006, the former May Company divisions were all dissolved, and operating control of the remaining Strawbridge's stores was assumed by Macy's East.

Macy's closed Strawbridge's flagship Center City store on May 23, 2006. On September 9, 2006, the Strawbridge's and Hecht's nameplates were completely phased-out in favor of the Macy's brand.

== Early history ==
Building the 1931 limestone flagship building nearly bankrupted the company during the Depression

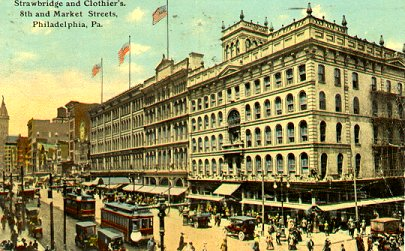
From 1870 to 1930, the 5-story S&C stood at 8th and Market Streets (1910s postcard)

=== 1800s ===
Strawbridge & Clothier began as a dry goods store founded by Quakers Justus Clayton Strawbridge (1838–1911) and Isaac Hallowell Clothier (1837–1921) in Philadelphia in 1868. Strawbridge & Clothier purchased the 3-story brick building on the northwest corner of Market and 8th Streets in Center City Philadelphia that had been Thomas Jefferson's office from 1790 to 1793 while he served as Secretary of State, and opened their first store. They soon replaced the old building with one of 5 stories, and then expanded into neighboring buildings as well.

=== 1900s ===
In 1928, the company decided to replace all but one of its buildings with a new edifice, and began construction in phases on the 13-story building which stands on the corner of Market and North 8th Street today. Designed in the Beaux Arts-style by the Philadelphia architectural firm Simon & Simon, the cost of the limestone building was expected to be $6.5 million, an amount which caused some concern to the store's owners. By the time of the ribbon-cutting in 1931 in the depth of the Great Depression, the staggering $10 million cost (equivalent to $212 million in 2025) of such grand construction nearly suffocated the cash-strapped company.

The building subsequently became the eastern anchor in 1977 of The Gallery, an urban mall connecting Strawbridge & Clothier with Gimbels, which had relocated from across Market Street to join the mall. It was the vision of S&C Chairman Stockton Strawbridge that was instrumental in revitalizing the Market East retail district in the 1970s, a vision that is still apparent today despite the demise of both Gimbels and Strawbridge's. He once said that his goal was to transform fading east Market Street into "the Champs-Élysées of Philadelphia."

=== Late 20th-century demise ===
After successfully fighting off a hostile takeover attempt by Ronald S. Baron in 1986, Strawbridge & Clothier survived as an independent, locally owned department store into the 1990s. In 1995, in an attempt to become the dominant retailer in the Philadelphia region, S&C partnered with Federated Department Stores, Pomeroys, and the Rubin Brothers real estate development company to acquire their rival Wanamaker's, but were outbid in bankruptcy court by May Department Stores Company. Subsequently, the 13 Strawbridge & Clothier department stores were themselves bought by May in 1996, when the Strawbridge & Clothier directors (mostly members of the Strawbridge and Clothier families) elected to liquidate operations over the vehement objections of patriarch Stockton Strawbridge. Strawbridge died not long after the sale. "He was the store, and the store was him," said his attorney Peter Hearn to the Philadelphia Daily News. Store employees and the public-at-large felt a sense of loss as well: many employees rushed to pay off their credit card accounts in full before the sale was finalized, "hoping that the proceeds would go to the founding families rather than [the new buyers]."

After the sale, the stores operated simply as "Strawbridge's", although exterior signage reading "Strawbridge & Clothier" remained in place at many locations until the stores became Macy's in 2006. May, which had merged the former John Wanamaker into its Hecht's banner, converted those stores to Strawbridge's as well. The Strawbridge & Clothier head office was closed and its operations were consolidated with Hecht's in Arlington, Virginia.

== Cultural significance ==
=== Radio station ===
For 13 years, from 1922 to 1935, the store operated WFI, an AM radio station. In 1935, the station merged with WLIT, owned by the Lit Brothers store across the street, to form WFIL, an NBC Blue network affiliate. WFIL remains on the air today on its original frequency, AM 560.

=== Dickens Village ===
In November 1985, Strawbridge's unveiled Dickens Village on the fourth floor of their flagship store. This Christmas display featured animatronic figures in a 6,000 sq. ft walk-through of 26 scenes from Charles Dickens's classic A Christmas Carol. As of 2024, Macy's, in the former Wanamaker's building, displays Dickens Village during the holiday season.

== Suburban branch stores ==
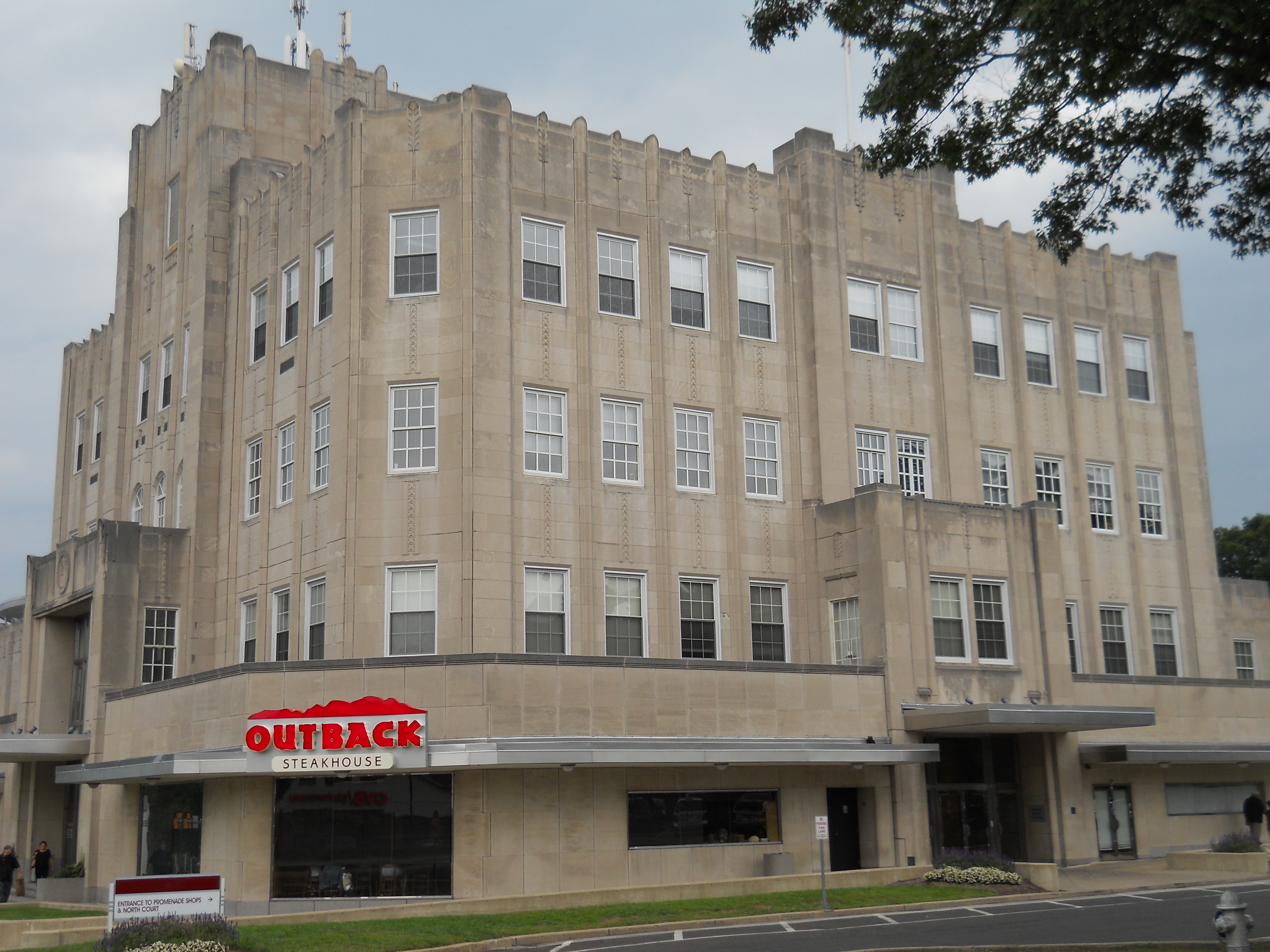
Jenkintown store, on the National Register of Historic Places

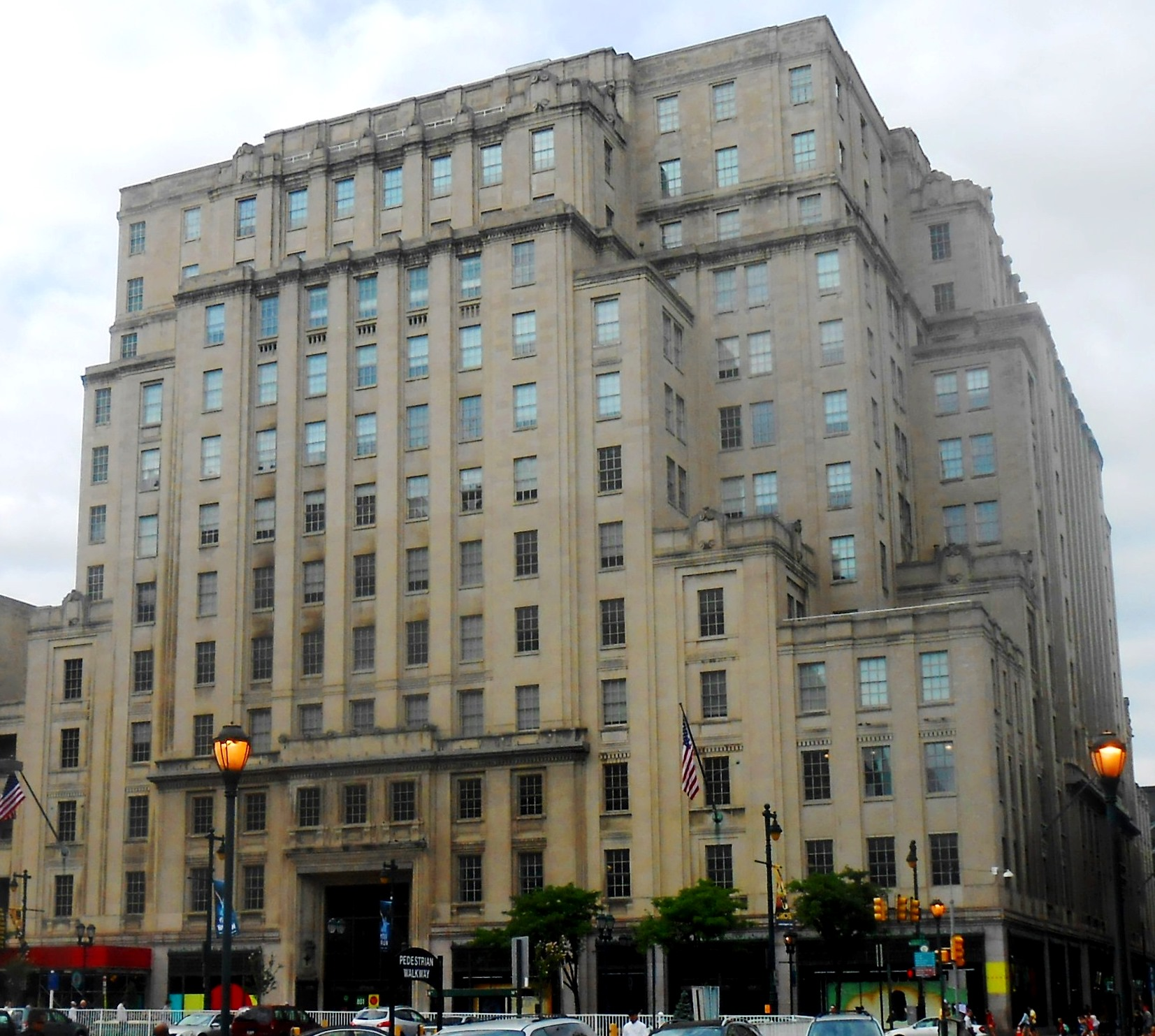
Refurbished flagship building (2014)

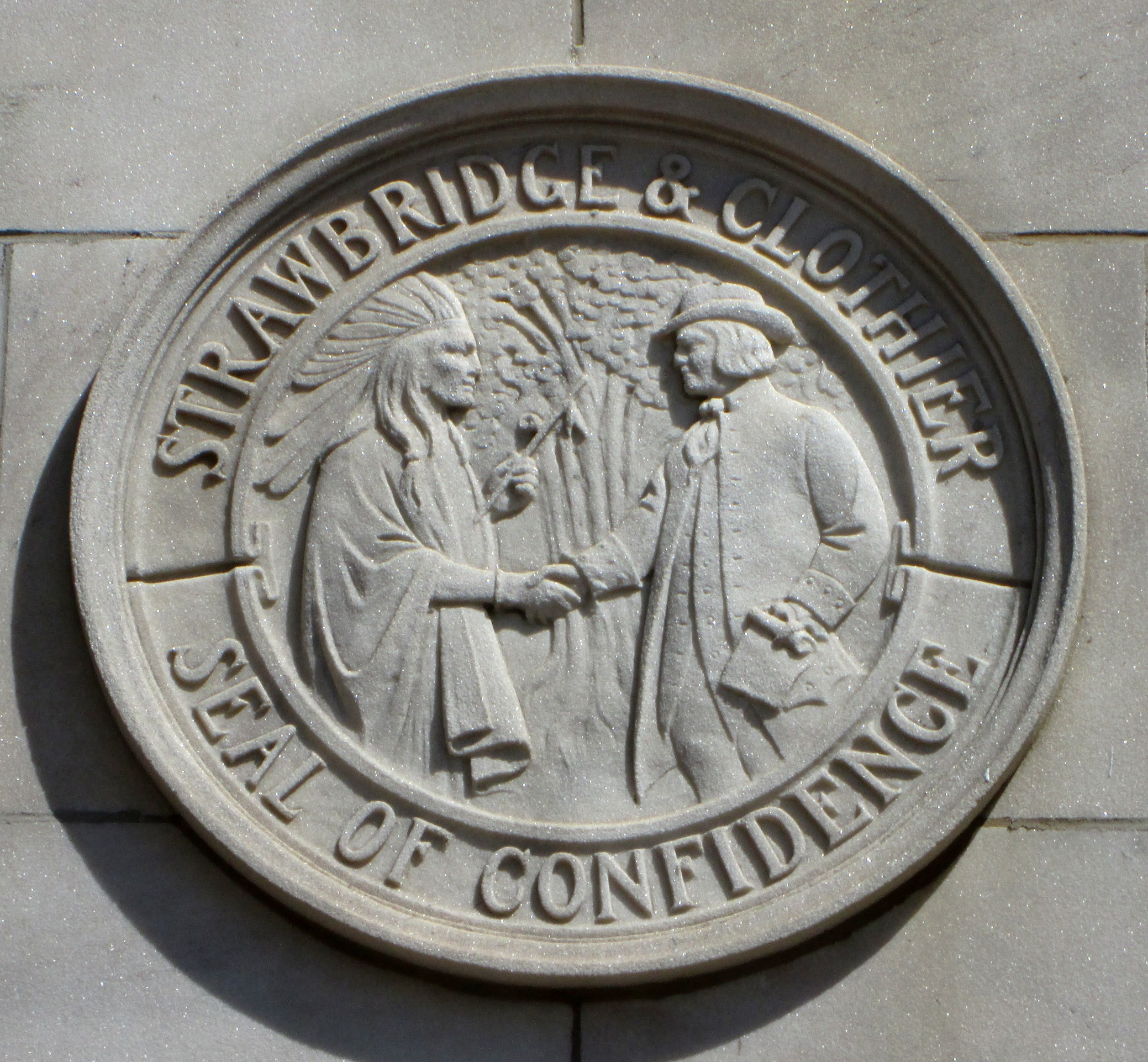
The S&C "Seal of Confidence" (1911-2006), depicting William Penn and a Lenape tribesman shaking hands, their "never written, never broken" treaty; it stood for S&C's Quaker-based tradition of fairness and honesty, which included a money-back guarantee on all merchandise

In May 1930, Strawbridge & Clothier helped remake the American retail scene by opening one of the first suburban branch department stores in the nation, located in the Suburban Square shopping center in Ardmore, Pennsylvania.[9] In 1931, it followed with its second suburban "satellite" store at Jenkintown, Pennsylvania, the building for which was listed on the National Register of Historic Places in 1988.[10]

Strawbridge's opened up a number branch stores throughout Pennsylvania, New Jersey, and Delaware. These branch stores typically were opened in shopping malls. Prominent stores throughout the Philadelphia area included the stores in Wilmington (1952), Cherry Hill (1961), Springfield (1964), Plymouth Meeting (1966), Neshaminy (1968), Echelon (1970), Exton (1973), Christiana (1978), Burlington, New Jersey (1982), Wilmington (1983), King of Prussia (1988) and Willow Grove (1989). By the 1970s, Strawbridge's had nearly a dozen branch stores in malls across eastern Pennsylvania, southern New Jersey, and northern Delaware. The branches proved to have been a wise step, as the flagship store posted only a few years of actual profitability, all of them during the 1940s. The last S&C store built was at the Concord Mall in Wilmington, Delaware in 1983.

In 1969, Strawbridge set his sights on competing with the emerging Target-grade retailers,[6] launching the Clover discount store chain; the first Clover store opened in 1971. Located in strip centers rather than malls for the most part, Clover grew to have 26 locations, more than the 21 full-service S&C stores. Most Clover stores closed in the winter of 1997.

=== Store features and branding ===
Some Strawbridge's stores had restaurants inside, like at the Christiana Mall, Exton Square Mall, Plymouth Meeting Mall, Neshaminy Mall, Cherry Hill Mall, Jenkintown store, and the Corinthian Room on the sixth floor of the flagship store.

The company also revolutionized retailing with their introduction of revolving charge account cards.

Strawbridge's was well known for its handled shopping bags which kept up with the fashion of each era. It was a paper bag, with navy blue handles with Strawbridge's printed in blue twice and red once on one side of the bag, and vice versa on the other. Once May assumed the company, the Strawbridge & Clothier Seal of Confidence was no longer a prominent marketing image. Late 1970s and 1980s bags were a bright glossy yellow with that era's pseudo calligraphic trademark in a vertical orientation in black along the bag's edge. 1960s bags featured a "modern" script-like trademark with their famous "seal of confidence".

Strawbridge's was also known for its friendly employees.

In the center of the flagship store was a large bronze statue of a wild boar, a replica of Pietro Tacca's Il Porcellino. Local legend had it that good luck would follow those who rubbed the boar's nose. The boar consequently had a very shiny nose from all the rubbing.

=== Repurposing of flagship store ===
In July 2006, PREIT, owners of The Gallery at Market East, agreed to purchase the lower floors of the flagship Strawbridge's store. PREIT sought retail tenants for the areas of the building closest to street level and converted some higher floors to office space. The uppermost floors had previously been sold and converted to offices; they are currently owned by American Financial Realty Trust of Jenkintown.

On February 26, 2009, it was announced that the developers of Foxwoods Casino Philadelphia were looking into locating their new casino on three floors of the former Strawbridge's flagship store currently owned by PREIT.

In April 2012, it was reported by one of the sub-contractors that the building was undergoing additional renovation for both office and residential use. In July 2012, The Philadelphia Inquirer and Philadelphia Daily News relocated to the third floor of the building from their former headquarters at 400 North Broad Street.

On October 23, 2014, the Century 21 Department Stores company of New York City opened its first location outside of the greater New York City area on a portion of the street level, and the entire second level of the Strawbridge's building. Century 21 closed in 2020 as a result of the chain filing for bankruptcy and closing all stores. On December 16, 2021, a Giant Heirloom Market grocery store opened in the ground level of the former Strawbridge's department store at 8th Street.

== See also ==
- Strawbridge and Clothier Store, Jenkintown
- List of department stores converted to Macy's
- List of defunct department stores of the United States
