= Ivory tower =

Metaphorical place of seclusion

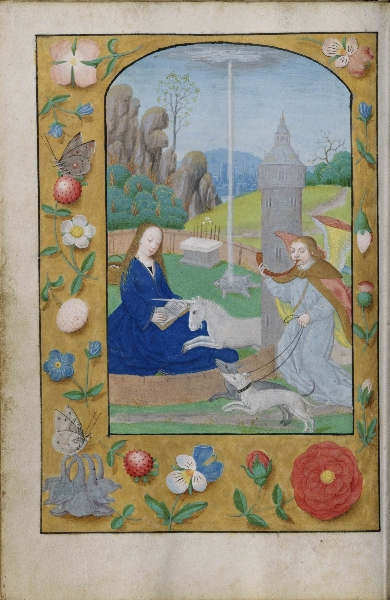
An ivory tower, as symbol of Mary, in the "Hunt of the Unicorn Annunciation" from a c. 1500 Netherlandish book of hours. For the complicated iconography, see Hortus Conclusus.

An ivory tower is a state of privileged seclusion from the practicalities of real life. An ivory tower can be a place where people choose to disconnect from the rest of the world to follow their own interests, usually mental or esoteric ones. From the 19th century, it has been used to designate an environment of intellectual pursuit disconnected from the practical concerns of everyday life. The term is often used now to refer to academia or the college and university systems. The term originated from the Biblical Song of Songs (7:4) with a different meaning and was later used as an epithet for Mary.

== Biblical usage ==
In the Christian tradition, the term ivory tower is used as a symbol for noble purity. It originates with the Song of Songs 7:4 ("Your neck is like an ivory tower", Hebrew: מגדל השן, romanized: miḡdal haš-šên; in the Hebrew Masoretic text, it is found in 7:5) and was included in the epithets for Mary in the sixteenth-century Litany of the Blessed Virgin Mary ("tower of ivory", turris eburnea in Latin), though the title and image were in use long before that, since the 12th-century Marian revival at least. It occasionally appears in art, especially in depictions of Mary in the hortus conclusus. Although the term is rarely used in the religious sense in modern times, it is credited with inspiring the modern meaning.

== Modern usage ==
The first modern usage of "ivory tower" in the familiar sense of an unworldly dreamer can be found in a poem of 1837, "Pensées d'Août, à M. Villemain", by Charles Augustin Sainte-Beuve, a French literary critic and author, who used the term "tour d'ivoire" for the poetical attitude of Alfred de Vigny as contrasted with the more socially engaged Victor Hugo: "Et Vigny, plus secret, Comme en sa tour d'ivoire, avant midi rentrait". [And Vigny, the more secretive, like he was in his ivory tower, returning before midday.] This poetic use of "tour d'ivoire" may have been an allusion to the rook (or castle) in chess, which is another meaning of the French word tour.

Henry James's last novel, The Ivory Tower, was begun in 1914 and left unfinished at his death two years later. Paralleling James' own dismaying experience of the United States after twenty years away, it chronicles the effect on a high-minded returning upper-class American of the vulgar emptiness of the Gilded Age. "You seem all here so hideously rich", says his hero. Thus, there are two meanings mixed together: mockery of an absent-minded savant and admiration of someone who is able to devote his or her entire efforts to a noble cause (hence "ivory", a noble but impractical building material). The term has a rather negative flavor today, the implication being that specialists who are so deeply drawn into their fields of study often can't find a lingua franca with laymen outside their "ivory towers".

In Andrew Hodges' biography of the University of Cambridge scientist Alan Turing, he discusses Turing's 1936–38 stay at Princeton University and writes that "[t]he tower of the Graduate College was an exact replica of Magdalen College, and it was popularly called the Ivory Tower, because of that benefactor of Princeton, the Procter who manufactured Ivory soap." William Cooper Procter (Princeton class of 1883) was a significant supporter of the construction of the Graduate College, and the main dining hall bears the Procter name. The skylines of Oxford and Cambridge universities, along with many Ivy League universities, are dotted with turrets and spires which are often described as 'Ivory Towers'.

In Randall Jarrell's essay "The End of the Line" (1942), Jarrell asserts that if modern poetry is to survive then poets must come down from the "Ivory Tower" of elitist composition. Jarrell's main thrust is that the rich poetry of the modernist period was over-dependent upon reference to other literary works. For Jarrell the Ivory Tower led modern poetry into obscurity.

Writers for Philadelphia's other newspapers sarcastically referred to the former headquarters of the establishment Philadelphia Inquirer, a white art deco tower called the Elverson Building, as the "Ivory Tower of Truth."

== Academic usage ==
The ivory tower is most often connected with the careers and lifestyles of academics in university and college systems. They have often garnered reputations as elite institutions by joining or creating associations with other universities. In many countries, these institutions aligned themselves with a specific mission or athletic ties. Some have criticized the elitism associated with these groups.

In certain instances, these ivory-tower universities have received a disproportionate amount of regional and national funding. They also produce a higher proportion of a country's publications and citations. They tend to be overrepresented in top university rankings, such as Academic Ranking of World Universities, QS World University Rankings, the Times Higher Education World University Rankings, and the U.S. News & World Report Best Global University Ranking.

== See also ==
- Blue skies research
- College and university rankings
- Gates of horn and ivory
- Laputa, Jonathan Swift's satire of the impractical research of the Royal Society
- Intelligentsia
- Sacred mountains
