= Interstate General Media =

Interstate General Media, LLC
- Founded: 2012
- Headquarters: 801 Market Street, Philadelphia, Pennsylvania, United States
- Key people: Robert J. Hall (CEO)
- Parent: Intertrust Group Holding S.A.

Interstate General Media, LLC, is a Philadelphia, Pennsylvania–based company founded in 2012 that operates newspapers and online news sources that it owns. In 2012, the company purchased The Philadelphia Inquirer, LLC, the company that owns and publishes The Philadelphia Inquirer, the Philadelphia Daily News, and the newspapers' joint website, Philly.com. In June 2014, IGM sold PMN to H. F. "Gerry" Lenfest, one of IGM's key executives and interim publisher and chairman. As of June 11, 2014, IGM was a subsidiary of Intertrust Group Holding S.A.
