= Gerry Lenfest =

American lawyer, business executive and philanthropist (1930–2018)

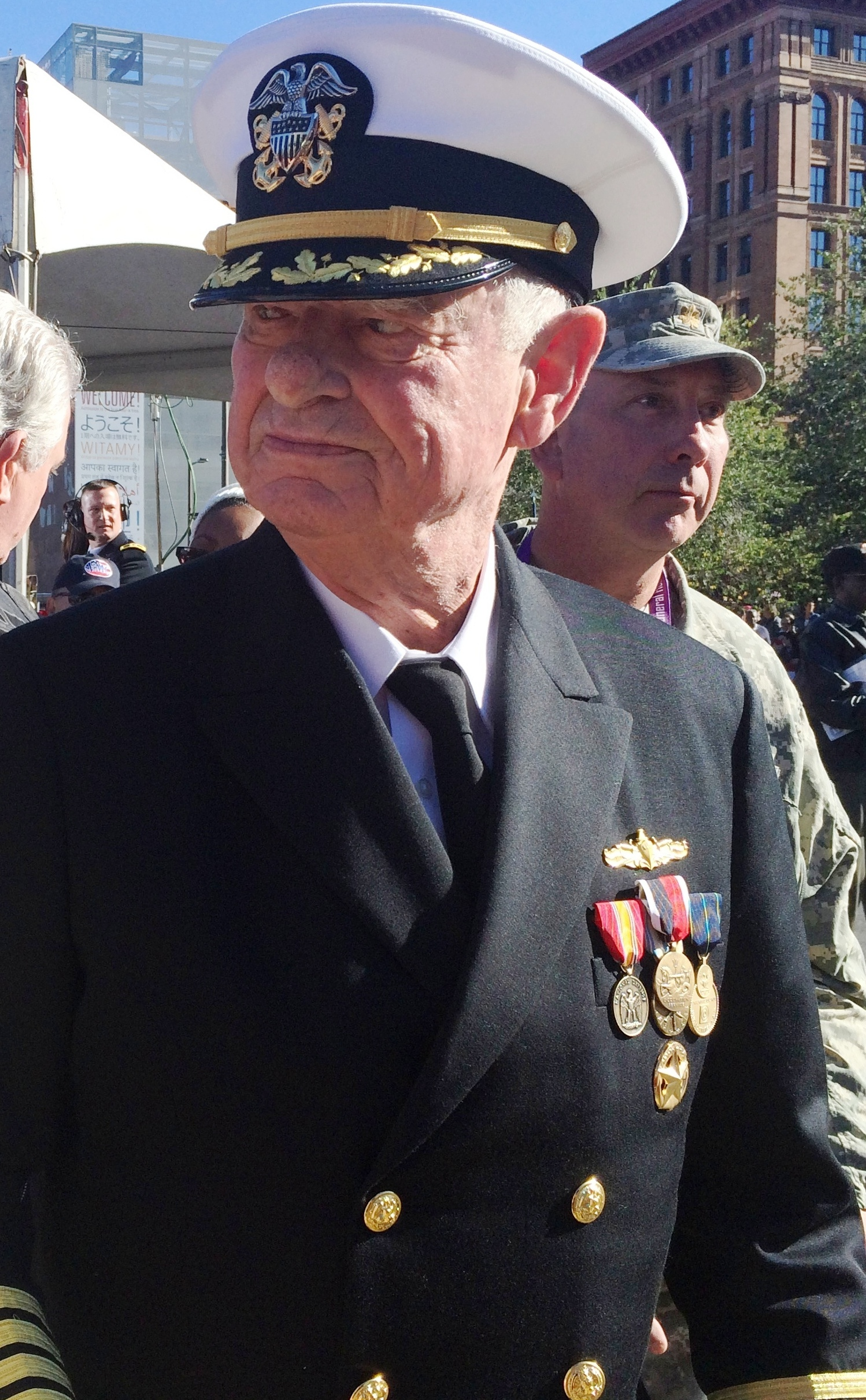
- Lenfest in 2015
- Born: Harold FitzGerald Lenfest; May 29, 1930; Jacksonville, Florida, U.S.
- Died: August 5, 2018 (aged 88); Philadelphia, Pennsylvania, U.S.
- Education: Washington and Lee University (BA); Columbia University (LLB)
- Occupations: Lawyer, business executive, philanthropist
- Political party: Democratic

Harold FitzGerald "Gerry" Lenfest (May 29, 1930 – August 5, 2018) was an American lawyer, media executive, and philanthropist. Lenfest, along with his wife Marguerite, were among the most prominent Philadelphia-based philanthropists in his last two decades, donating more than $1.3 billion to 1,100 groups, supporting various educational, artistic, journalistic, and healthcare causes.

== Early life and education ==
Lenfest was born on May 29, 1930, in Jacksonville, Florida, then grew up in Scarsdale, New York, and Hunterdon County, New Jersey. His father was a naval architect; his mother died of a cerebral hemorrhage when he was 13. He had a twin sister, Marie Lenfest Schmitz. He attended Flemington High School in New Jersey and (for one year) the George School in Newtown, Pennsylvania, before graduating from Mercersburg Academy. Lenfest went on to receive his B.A. in economics from Washington and Lee University in 1953. Lenfest played on the Washington & Lee soccer team and was a member of Sigma Chi.

He attended Columbia Law School, graduating with an LL.B. in 1958.

== Career ==
He served in the Navy between college and law school. He later served for 24 years in the U.S. Navy Reserve, attaining the rank of captain.

After graduating from Columbia Law School, Lenfest worked at the firm of Davis Polk & Wardwell before becoming, in 1965, associate counsel to Triangle Publications, Inc., the media company controlled by Walter Annenberg. The company owned the Philadelphia Inquirer, Philadelphia Daily News, TV Guide, and Seventeen magazine, as well as various television stations, radio stations, and cable enterprises. In 1970, he was named head of the Communications Division at Triangle. He formed Lenfest Communications Inc. (LCI) in 1974; using funds from loans and two investors, the new privately held company purchased two cable systems with 7,600 customers from Annenberg. Based in Wilmington, Delaware, LCI grew and had become the largest cable operator in the Philadelphia metropolitan area by the late 1990s, with a base of 1.2 million subscribers in Pennsylvania, New Jersey, and Delaware. Lenfest was also president of Suburban Cable TV Co. Inc., a subsidiary of LCI.

AT&T eventually acquired a one-half ownership interest in LCI. In November 1999, Lenfest reached an agreement to sell the remaining half of LCI (including Suburban Cable) to AT&T; as part of a complex transaction, AT&T then immediately sold the Lenfest company to Comcast for $6.7 billion in stock and debt. At the time of the sale, LCI was the ninth-largest cable television operator in the United States. The transaction was completed in January 2000. AT&T's sale of Lenfest Communications to Comcast helped AT&T gain regulatory approval for its purchase of MediaOne. Lenfest and his wife received $1.2 billion from the sale of LCI.

Lenfest's wife Marguerite B. Lenfest, played an active role in the family's businesses. Of the proceeds, Lenfest took $60 million, giving half to the company's managers and the other half to the company's other employees, citing their role in making LCI a success.

Lenfest was chairman of the board of TelVue Corporation from 1989 to 2017.

== Philanthropy ==
Gerry and Marguerite Lenfest were among the most prominent Philadelphia-based philanthropists in his last two decades, donating more than $1.3 billion to 1,100 groups, supporting various educational, artistic, journalistic, and healthcare causes. They began their philanthropy before 2000, but began making massive charitable contributions after the sale of LCI. They pledged to donate their entire fortune to worthy causes. The couple was critical of perpetual foundations, deciding to give away the bulk of their wealth during their lifetime, and to wind down their foundation no later than 30 years after their deaths. They also opted not to establish a family foundations, believing in individual giving instead. Gerry Lenfest cited agreement with Andrew Carnegie's idea that "The man who dies thus rich dies disgraced." The scale of the Lenfests' contributions in the Philadelphia region is rivaled only by the contributions of the Annenberg and Haas families.

Lenfest became friendly with Keith Leaphart, who cleaned Lenfest's office. The two went on to become businesses associates and Leaphart became chair of the Lenfest Foundation.

=== Education ===
By the time of his death, the Lenfests had contributed at least $155 million to Columbia University. The university's president, Lee C. Bollinger, said in 2009 that the Lenfests were "the fourth-most-generous donors to Columbia" in the institution's history, giving more than $100 million up to that point. In addition to his contributions to his alma mater, Columbia Law School, Lenfest also made contributions to Columbia's Earth Institute, Columbia Medical School, and arts and sciences programs. In 2011, Lenfest pledged $30 million for construction of a multi-arts venue, the Lenfest Center for the Arts, at Columbia's Manhattanville campus; the Center, designed by Renzo Piano's architectural firm, opened in 2017.

The Lenfests also donated $109 million to Mercersburg Academy, $81 million to Washington and Lee University (Gerry's alma mater), $40 million to Wilson College (Marguerite's alma mater), $32 million to the Lenfest Scholars Program, $20.5 million to the Williamson College of the Trades, $13.9 million to Teach for America, $10.2 million to Mastery Charter Schools, $10 million to the Lenfest Prep School Scholarship Program, $8.5 million to Temple University, $7.7 million to the Lenfest College Scholarship Program, $7.6 million to Ursinus College, and $6.4 million to Drexel University.

Lenfest was a member of the Washington and Lee University board of trustees from 1989 to 1998. He was a member of the board of trustees of Temple University from 2013 until his death in 2018. He served for a period as the Temple board's vice chairman. In 2019, Marguerite Lenfest joined the Temple board of trustees.

Lenfest's donations to Temple University funded the construction of the Joe First Media Center for the Klein College of Media and Communication, the renovation of the Lew Klein Hall at the Temple Performing Arts Center, and restoration work at the East Park Canoe House, which houses the university's rowing and crew teams. Although he was not himself a rower, Lenfest was a longtime admirer of Philadelphia's Boathouse Row, and believed preserving the heritage of the sport on the Schuylkill River was important.

=== Arts and culture ===
Gerry Lenfest served on the boards of many cultural institutions in Philadelphia; at one point, Lenfest simultaneously served on the boards of the Philadelphia Museum of Art, the Curtis Institute of Music, and Museum of the American Revolution. Marguerite Lenfest also served on the board of various institutions, including the Pennsylvania Academy of the Fine Arts.

The Lenfests gave the Curtis Institute of Music in Philadelphia $63.6 million in endowment. Lenfest Hall, which opened in 2011 and was designed by the architectural firm of Robert Venturi, is named in his honor.

Lenfest was elected a trustee of the Philadelphia Museum of Art in 1993, and became chairman of the museum's board in 2001. He was chairman of the board of trustees of the Curtis Institute of Music from 2006 to 2014; he was succeeded as board chair by Nina, Baroness von Maltzahn.

The Lenfests collected works by painters in the Pennsylvania Impressionism movement; in 1999, they donated 59 paintings, as well as $3 million, to the James A. Michener Art Museum in Doylestown, Pennsylvania, and later acquired three additional paintings by Edward Willis Redfield that they added to their donation to the Michener. In addition to works by Redfield, the paintings donated included works by Daniel Garber, Fern I. Coppedge, William Langson Lathrop, John Fulton Folinsbee, Robert Spencer, and Charles Rosen.

=== Conservation, history museums, and historic preservation ===
In 2007, Lenfest donated hundreds of acres of land in Newlin Township in Chester County, Pennsylvania to form the ChesLen Preserve. Located close to West Branch Brandywine Creek, the mixture of woodlands and agricultural areas eventually reached 1,263 acres; it is crisscrossed with hiking trails and is intended to remain minimally developed in perpetuity.

Lenfest began to donate to the SS United States Conservancy in 2009, and in July 2010, Lenfest pledged up to $5.8 million to the conservancy. Of the sum, $3 million was to buy the historic ocean liner SS United States from Norwegian Cruise Lines (then owned by Genting Hong Kong), and the rest was to continue to berth the historic ship in South Philadelphia and outfit it for its next use.

Lenfest was the largest single contributor to the Museum of the American Revolution in Philadelphia. In 2012, Lenfest made a challenge grant toward establishment of the museum. The museum opened to the public in April 2017. Lenfest donated some $60 million to the museum during his life. The museum was also the beneficiary of a $50 million bequest from his estate, almost doubling the size of its endowment. From 2005 to 2016, Lenfest was chairman of the Museum's board.

Lenfest gave $500,000 to the National Museum of American Jewish History and $650,000 to the American Friends of the Israel Museum in Jerusalem.

=== Philadelphia Inquirer and journalistic nonprofits ===
Lenfest believed strongly that journalism, including local journalism, is indispensable to democracy. In April 2012, Lenfest and a consortium of others, including Lewis Katz and George E. Norcross III, purchased Philadelphia Media Network (PMN), the holding company that owned The Philadelphia Inquirer, the Philadelphia Daily News, and the newspapers' joint website, Philly.com. Lenfest said that he acquired the newspapers not as an investment, but to serve to public good.

The ownership group soon feuded among themselves, with Lenfest and Katz falling out with Norcross. In October 2013, Inquirer publisher Robert J. Hall fired the newspaper's top editor, Bill Marimow, prompting a public furor. Katz and Lenfest sued in the Philadelphia Court of Common Pleas, seeking Marimow's reinstatement as editor, and arguing that the attempted firing violated the ownership agreement; Norcross countersued. In November 2013, the court ordered Marimow's reinstatement.

In April 2014, amid continued disputes among the company's owners, a judge of the Delaware Court of Chancery ordered the dissolution of Interstate General Media (the ownership group's Delaware LLC, which owned PNM), and the sale of PNM at a private auction among the current owners. At the court-ordered auction the following month, Lenfest and Katz purchased PNM, outbidding fellow minority owners Norcross and Joseph Buckelew. Lenfest and Katz made the purchase for $88 million, resolving the feud. After Katz died in a plane crash shortly after the sale, Lenfest purchased Katz's share from Katz's son. Lenfest thus became chairman and sole owner of the Inquirer, Daily News, and Philly.com.

In 2016, Lenfest donated PMN to a newly created nonprofit, the Institute for Journalism in New Media, formed at Lenfest's behest by the nonprofit The Philadelphia Foundation, to ensure that the two newspapers would continue to operate to serve Philadelphia. Lenfest also gave $20 million to endow the nonprofit journalism institute, which owns the newspapers and website but has no editorial or managerial control over them. The complex transaction made the Inquirer the largest U.S. newspaper under nonprofit ownership. The Institute for Journalism in New Media was renamed the Lenfest Institute for Journalism in 2017. In addition to supporting the Inquirer, the institute gave $7.5 million in grants to various press organizations, including WHYY. Upon his death, the Lenfest estate gave an additional $50 million to the Lenfest Institute for Journalism.

=== Other contributions ===
The Lenfests donated approximately $6.3 million to the Abington Health Foundation, mostly given toward the building of the five-story Lenfest Pavilion addition to Abington Memorial Hospital in Abington Township in Montgomery County, Pennsylvania; the project was completed in 2005. The Lenfests also contributed $5 million to the Foundation Fighting Blindness and $1 million to the Einstein Medical Center Philadelphia.

== Awards and honors ==
Lenfest was elected to membership in the American Philosophical Society in 2004. Gerry and Marguerite were honored with The Philadelphia Award in 2009, and with the Carnegie Medal of Philanthropy in 2017. Columbia University awarded him an honorary LL.D. in 2019. Temple University awarded him an honorary doctorate in 2002, and awarded him its Russell H. Conwell Award in 2003. Temple's Fox School of Business honored him with its Musser Award for Excellence in Leadership in 2006. He was named to the Philanthropy Roundtable's Almanac of American Philanthropy Hall of Fame.

== Personal life and death ==
Lenfest married his wife Marguerite in 1955. They had three children. They lived in a modest home in the Philadelphia suburb of Huntingdon Valley, which the couple purchased for $35,000 (equal to $347,308 today, despite actual real estate prices being much higher in 2025) in 1966, and also maintained a home in Philadelphia's Rittenhouse Square.

Lenfest was a Protestant.

Lenfest died on August 5, 2018, aged 88, in Philadelphia.
