= Share Food Program =

Philadelphia food bank

- Formation: 1986
- Type: Nonprofit
- Location: Philadelphia, United States
- Region served: Philadelphia
- Services: Food bank
- Executive Director: George Matysik
- Chief Program Officer: Steve Preston
- Affiliations: CSFP - Commodity Supplemental Food Program; FMNP - Farmers Market Nutrition Program; NSLP - National School Lunch Program; SNAP - Supplemental Nutrition Assistance Program; TEFAP - The Emergency Food Assistance Program
- Website: www.sharefoodprogram.org

Share Food Program is a social services organization working for hunger relief in the Philadelphia region of Pennsylvania, United States. It serves as a food bank to the communities in accordance with USDA civil rights regulations and feeds more than 1 million people each month in Philadelphia and the suburbs. Share Food Program is the largest hunger-relief agency in the Greater Philadelphia area.

== History ==
Share Food Program was founded in 1986 as a 501(c)(3) non-profit organization, focused on increasing access to low-cost food in Philadelphia, using a food co-operative model. Beginning in 1991, it expanded its operations to fight hunger, by getting food to people in need throughout the city.

During the COVID-19 outbreak that began in March 2020, the organization partnered with SEAMAAC, a Philadelphia-based non-profit to distribute 1,000 meals and food boxes a day since mid-May 2020. In October 2020, it received grant from William Penn Foundation and, along with other donations, was able to give away 10 million pounds of food.

In January 2021, State Senator Vincent Hughes presented state funding to the Share Food Program for warehouse maintenance. On the National Day of Service, over 100 volunteers participated to distribute food to seniors’ programs and families in need. In February 2021, the organization received a grant from Dunkin Joy in Childhood Foundation.

In 2023, Share had raised $28M of a $35M goal to upgrade its food distribution warehouse on West Hunting Park Ave in North Philadelphia.

== Overview ==
Share Food Program distributes food to 1 million needy people each month, over 50% of whom are children, and 12% of whom are seniors or people with disabilities. It also serves 305,000 children through the national school lunch and breakfast program to 69 regional districts in Philadelphia. The food comes from government partners, supermarkets, wholesalers, restaurants, farms and food drives.

The organization partners with 150 pantries around Philadelphia as part of its Partner Pantries program. Other programs include food relief, MontCo Hunger Solutions, Nice Roots farm and home deliveries. It also partners with DoorDash, delivering 4,500 boxes of food a month in 2024. In about two hours, more than 500 of 32-pound boxes of food are dispatched to low-income area seniors in need in Philadelphia area counties via DoorDash.
