= Philadelphia Media Holdings =

Philadelphia Media Holdings LLC
- Company type: Limited liability company
- Industry: Media
- Founded: Philadelphia, U.S. (2006)
- Founder: Brian Tierney
- Defunct: December 8, 2010
- Fate: Bankruptcy
- Successor: Philadelphia Media Network
- Headquarters: Philadelphia, Pennsylvania, U.S.
- Key people: Brian Tierney (Founder and CEO (2006–2010)); Joseph Bondi (CEO (2010))

Philadelphia Media Holdings LLC was an American holding company located in Philadelphia, Pennsylvania, United States. Founded by Brian Tierney in 2006, the company owned The Philadelphia Inquirer and Philadelphia Daily News. After The McClatchy Company bought Knight Ridder in 2006, it announced it would sell, among other newspapers, The Philadelphia Inquirer and Philadelphia Daily News. Interested in buying the papers, Brian Tierney assembled a group of Philadelphia businesspeople and investors to make a bid. In May 2006 Philadelphia Media Holdings bought the papers for $515 million plus the assumption of the newspapers' liabilities. Declining circulation and ad revenue for The Inquirer and Daily News caused financial strain, which resulted in the filing for Chapter 11 bankruptcy protection. The company's creditors acquired the newspapers at auction and established a new holding company, Philadelphia Media Network, in 2010.

== History ==
=== Founding ===
In 2005, media company Knight Ridder's share listed price dropped to US$52.42 from US$80 in 2004. This drop in stock price prompted the company's three top stock holders to pressure Knight Ridder's board of directors to sell the company to raise the price of its shares. Knight Ridder was put up for sale in November 2005, with The McClatchy Company announcing it was purchasing the company in March 2006. Along with the purchase, the McClatchy Company announced it was selling twelve of the least profitable Knight Ridder newspapers, including The Philadelphia Inquirer, the Philadelphia Daily News, and the two papers' joint website, Philly.com.

Before the announcement of the sale of Knight Ridder, Brian Tierney, the founder and former CEO of the public relations and advertising firm Tierney Communications, had expressed interest in purchasing the Philadelphia papers. After the announcement of McClathcy's plan to sell the papers, Tierney began to assemble a group of advisers and investors to purchase the papers with. Tierney formed a group of Philadelphia area investors and businesspeople to form Philadelphia Media Holdings. Almost all of the investors were either former clients of Tierney's or were with him on the board of directors of The Episcopal Academy. While Tierney found investors, Citizens Financial Group's president Stephen Steinour arranged financing. Working with Tierney a month before they even knew if the Philadelphia papers would be for sale, Steinour arranged US$450 million in financing from Citizens Financial Group's owner, the Royal Bank of Scotland.

Competing with Onex Corporation, Yucaipa Cos., Avista, and Daily News L.P. for the Philadelphia newspapers, Philadelphia Media Holdings submitted its bid on May 16. On May 17, Tierney was told Philadelphia Media Holdings had the best bid, but they needed more money. After two days of negotiations, on May 19 McClatchy chairman Gary B. Pruitt told Tierney they had a deal. The deal was announced May 23, with Philadelphia Media Holdings paying US$515 million and assuming the papers' liabilities, including US$47 million in pension liabilities.

There was excitement that The Philadelphia Inquirer and the Philadelphia Daily News would be under local ownership for the first time since Walter Annenberg sold the paper to Knight Newspapers in 1969. The buyout was met with skepticism, however, among the employees at The Inquirer, who feared the new owners might threaten the editorial independence of the newspaper. Concerns were especially directed to Brian Tierney, who in the past had criticized Inquirer reporters for doing negative stories about his clients during his time at Tierney Communications. Tierney allayed fears by having the members of Philadelphia Media Holdings sign a pledge not to interfere with the paper's editorial independence. Tierney said he would combat The Inquirer's decreasing revenue and circulation by spending millions on advertisements and promotions and not by laying off staff.

=== Bankruptcy ===
The Philadelphia Inquirer's and Philadelphia Daily News' circulation had been steadily dropping years before Philadelphia Media Holdings bought the papers. In 2007 The Inquirer's weekday circulation slightly rose, however its Sunday circulation continued to drop. The rise in circulation was only temporary and the newspaper's circulation has since continued to fall. Not helping the financial situation is the unexpected large drop in advertisement revenue. To help cut cost and repay debt Philadelphia Media Holdings cut jobs at The Philadelphia Inquirer in January 2007, and again at The Inquirer and the Daily News in February 2008.

On June 1, 2008, Philadelphia Media Holdings missed its interest payment on US$85 million in junior loans. Philadelphia Media Holdings missed the payment because it didn't maintain debt-to-cash flow ratio its senior lenders required so they blocked the payment. The company began negotiations with its lenders to restructure its debt and in October 2008 Philadelphia Media Holdings deferred paying its interest payment despite having the money to do so. Charged $13.4 million in penalty interest and fees, Philadelphia Media Holdings continued negotiations with lenders until February 20, 2009, when the talks collapsed. Late the next day Philadelphia Newspapers LLC, the subsidiary of Philadelphia Media Holdings that owns the papers, filed for Chapter 11 bankruptcy protection. Philadelphia Media Holdings hoped to restructure its US$390 million in debt it incurred when buying the newspapers.

The bankruptcy declaration was the beginning of a year-long dispute between Philadelphia Media Holdings and its creditors. The group of creditors, which include banks and hedge funds, wanted to take control of Philadelphia Newspapers LLC themselves and opposed efforts by Philadelphia Media Holdings to keep control. Philadelphia Media Holdings received support form most of the paper's unions and launched a public-relations campaign to promote local ownership. A bankruptcy auction was held on April 28, 2010. The group of lending creditors and a group of local investors allied with Brian Tierney both bid for Philadelphia Newspapers, but the lenders had the winning bid. On May 21, Brian Tierney stepped down as CEO of Philadelphia Media Holdings and was replaced by Joseph Bondi, the company's restructuring adviser.

The deal fell through after the group of lenders, under the name of Philadelphia Media Network, was unable to agree on a contract agreement with the union representing the company's drivers. The papers went up for auction again in September, with Philadelphia Media Network competing with Raymond Perelman, father of Ronald Perelman. Philadelphia Media Network again won the auction and, after successfully negotiating a contract with all of the papers' fourteen unions, the US$139 million deal became official on October 8.

== Publications ==
Philadelphia Media Holdings owned and published Philadelphia, Pennsylvania, United States two major morning daily newspapers, The Philadelphia Inquirer and Philadelphia Daily News. The company also published three suburban weeklies, The Trend, the Northeast Times, and Star Publications. The magazine publishing division of The Philadelphia Inquirer was called Broad Street Magazines and published six magazines. The magazines were Home & Living, Adult 55+, Beach & Bay, My Wedding, Communities, and Phillycars.
