= Waldron Mercy Academy =

Catholic private elementary school in Pennsylvania, USA

Coordinates: 40.00794°N 75.25018°W

Location
- 513 Montgomery Ave; Merion Station, Montgomery County, Pennsylvania 19066; United States

Information
- Type: Private
- Motto: United in Mercy; Educated in Excellence; Empowered to Serve
- Religious affiliation: Roman Catholic
- Established: 1923
- Principal: Jacquelinë Coccia
- Faculty: 47.6 FTEs
- Grades: K-8
- Gender: Coeducational
- Enrollment: 414
- Student to teacher ratio: 7.4:1
- Campus type: Suburban
- Athletics conference: CAL (Catholic Athletic League); CYO (Catholic Youth Organization)
- Mascot: Tiger
- Rival: Gwynedd Mercy Academy
- Tuition: $17,850
- Affiliation: Sisters of Mercy
- Website: www.waldronmercy.org

Waldron Mercy Academy is a private K-8 Catholic elementary school sponsored by the Sisters of Mercy and located in the Archdiocese of Philadelphia in Merion, Pennsylvania. The school is accredited by the Middle States Association of Colleges and Schools and has twice won National Blue Ribbon School recognition (in 2001 and 2009) from the United States Department of Education.

== History ==
In 1861, Sister Mary Patricia Waldron, who was 26 at the time, and ten Sisters of Mercy landed in Philadelphia where many of the Sisters became ill, Waldron bought an eight-acre retreat in Merion for their recovery. In 1885, the adjoining Morgan Estate was purchased. The 13-room stone house became St. Anne Convent, and the farmhouse held the Village School for the local farm children.

The Sisters of Mercy began Mater Misericordiae, an academy for young ladies and boys under 12 years of age, in 1885. In 1923, the male boarding students moved to a new school on the property—Waldron Academy for Boys.

By 1946 the boarders had gone, and Waldron Academy was an all-boys school taught by the Sisters of Mercy. Lay faculty and staff joined in the 1950s, and soon after Waldron added a preschool and a co-educational Montessori program.

In September 1987 Waldron Academy for Boys and Merion Mercy Academy for Girls (lower school) merged and reopened as Waldron Mercy Academy, a Catholic co-educational school from pre-kindergarten to grade eight. Waldron Mercy Child Care, a year-round program for children ages three months to four years, was added to the school 15 years later.

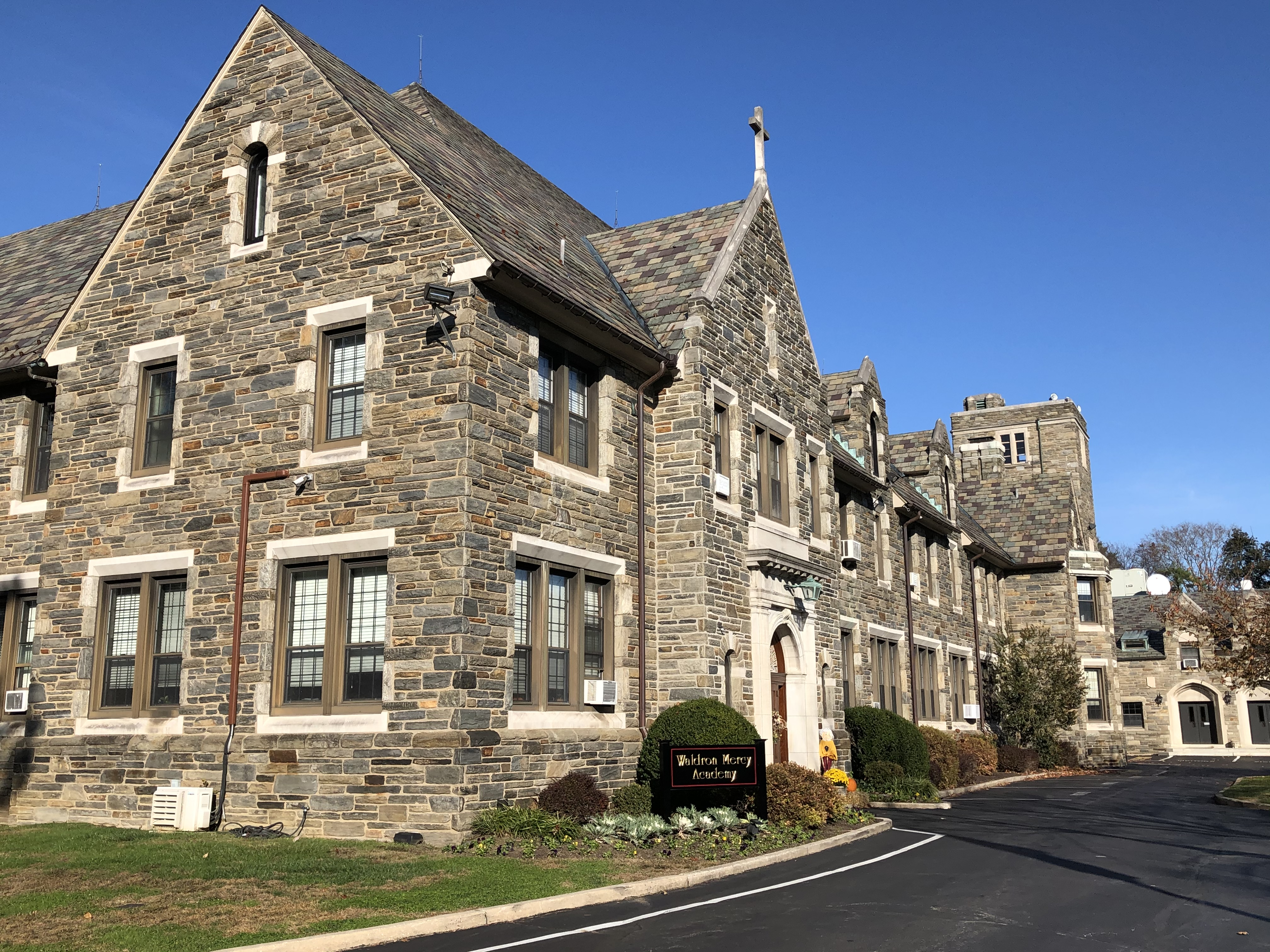

== Margie Winters controversy ==
In 2015, the Academy came under public scrutiny for firing of a teacher who is in a same-sex marriage because the school board of directors and the Sisters of Mercy decided that its Catholic identity would be in jeopardy.

Margie Winters, the school's director of religious education, was dismissed from the Academy after a parent reported her directly to the Archdiocese of Philadelphia for marrying her female partner in a civil marriage ceremony in 2007. Winters had informed school administrators when she was hired, and was told to not discuss the matter in school, which she says she abided by. A parent subsequently reported the fact that she had married directly to the Archdiocese of Philadelphia. In response, the principal asked her to resign. Winters declined to do so, and the school decided not to renew her contract. Many teachers and parents in the school community disagreed with the decision and voiced their support for the teacher, with several expressing anger and concern. Principal Nell Stetser said that "many of us accept life choices that contradict current Church teachings, but to continue as a Catholic school, Waldron Mercy must comply with those teachings." But she called urgently for "an open and honest discussion about this and other divisive issues at the intersection of our society and our Church." The Huffington Post said that the Archbishop of Philadelphia Charles Chaput had ignored such a call. Instead, Chaput had praised the "character and common sense [of school administrators] at a moment when both seem to be uncommon."

In September 2015 Winters was invited to a reception held at the White House with President Barack Obama to welcome Pope Francis on his visit to the U.S.

== Awards & accreditations ==
In 2016 a team of three boys in fourth grade won the Toshiba ExploraVision competition's region 2 competition. In 2015 a team of three third grade girls won the national competition. Waldron has participated in the Toshiba ExploraVision competition for 12 years, winning multiple honors including national, regional, and honorable mentions for the last four years.

In 2001 and 2009, Waldron Mercy Academy was named a Blue Ribbon School by the U.S. Department of Education. This is the highest honor bestowed on a US school.

== Notable alumni ==
- Alexander Newcomer, U.S. squash player from Pennsylvania from 2010 until 2026.
- Bill Kuharich, former vice president of player personnel, Kansas City Chiefs.
- M. Night Shyamalan, director, The Sixth Sense.
- Brian Tierney, former CEO and publisher, The Philadelphia Inquirer.
- Rob McElhenney, American actor, screenwriter and producer.
