= Inquirer Building =

- The Inquirer Building (Elverson Building)
- U.S. National Register of Historic Places
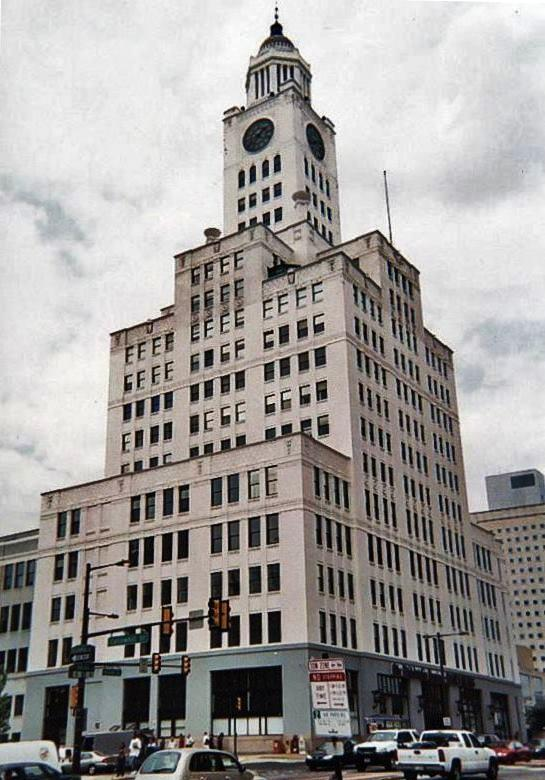
- The Inquirer Building in 2006

- Location within Philadelphia Location within Pennsylvania Location within the United States
- Location: 400 N. Broad Street, Philadelphia, Pennsylvania
- Coordinates: 39°57′36″N 75°09′44″W
- Area: 7.5 acres (3.0 ha)
- Built: 1923-24
- Architects: Rankin, Kellogg & Crane; Roydhouse, Arey, Co.
- Architectural style: Beaux-Arts
- NRHP reference No.: 96000716
- Added to NRHP: July 15, 1996

The Inquirer Building, formerly called the Elverson Building, is an eighteen-story building at the intersection of North Broad and Callowhill Streets in the Logan Square neighborhood of Center City Philadelphia, completed in 1924 as the new home for The Philadelphia Inquirer, a daily newspaper in the city, that was joined by the Philadelphia Daily News in 1957.

The building's original name refers to James Elverson, the publisher of the Inquirer from 1889 until his death in 1911. His son, James Elverson Jr., took over as publisher, and had the building constructed and dedicated to his father.

The building is the new headquarters of the Philadelphia Police Department, the 6th and 9th Police Districts, and the Medical Examiner's Office.

== History ==
=== 20th century ===
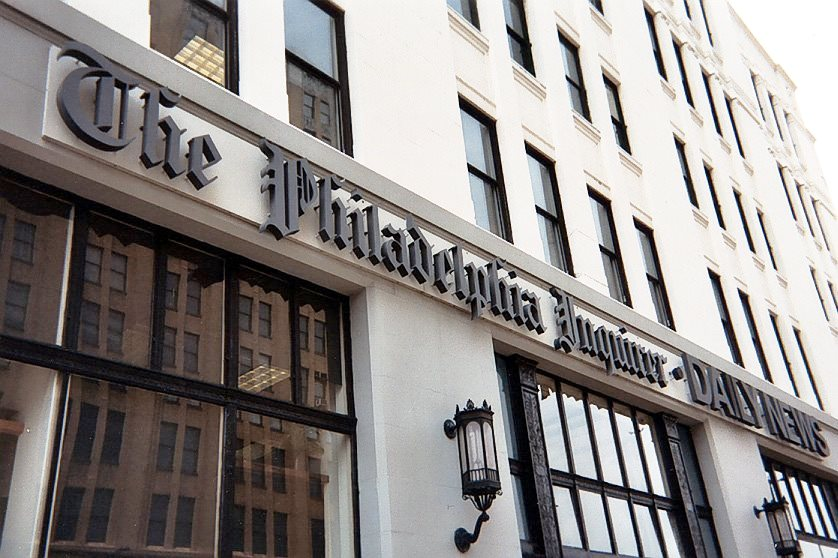
A sign for The Philadelphia Inquirer over the building's entrance in 2006

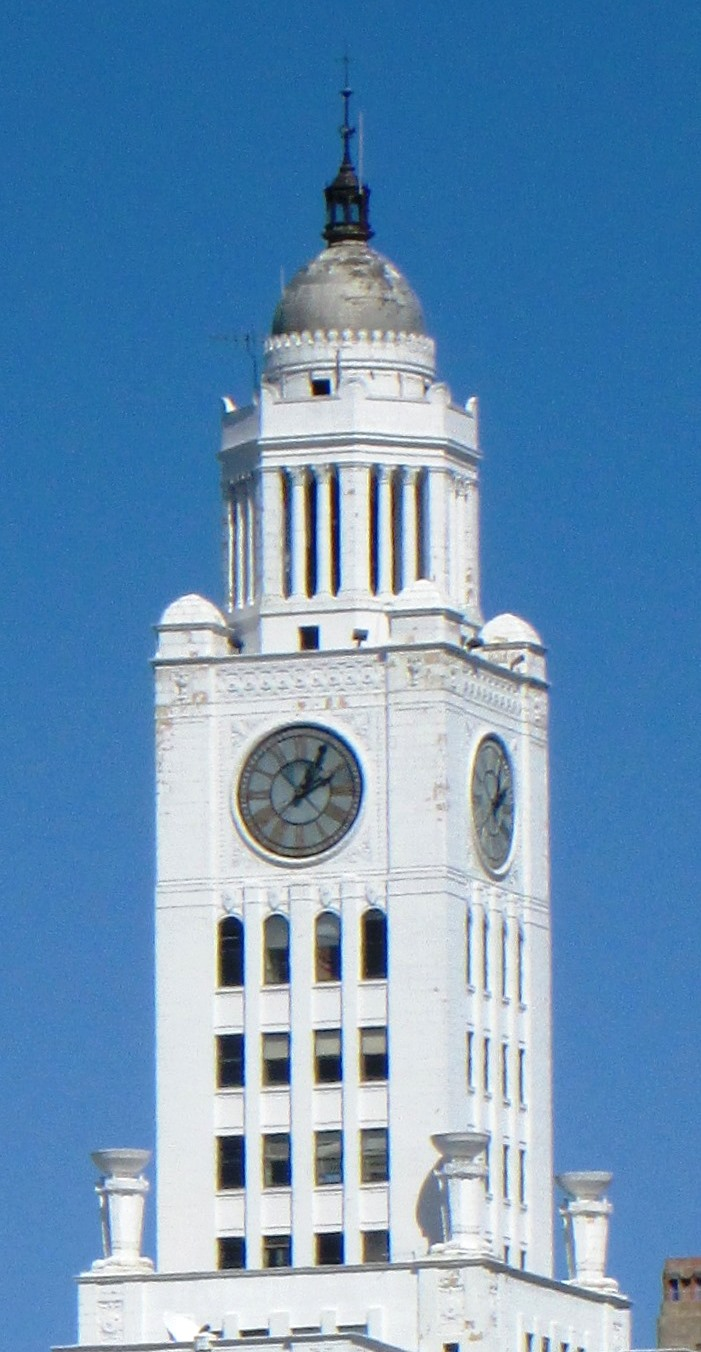
The building's tower as seen from Vine Street near Logan Circle in 2013

Construction began on the building in July 1923. It was designed in the Beaux-Arts style by Rankin, Kellogg & Crane, and was, at the time, the tallest building north of City Hall. Its gold dome, and the four-faced clock under it, could be seen for many miles. The building is 340 feet (100 m) tall.

The first issue of The Philadelphia Inquirer printed at the building was on July 13, 1925. The newspaper operation was considered at the time to have the most modern printing plant in the world, with the largest composing room and fastest printing presses. The building also featured an auditorium and an assembly hall, and had its own refrigeration and water filtration plant.

The interior features a globe chandelier in the lobby, and a catwalk over the former press room. Elverson and his wife made their home on the building's 12th and 13th floors.

In 1996, the building was added to the National Register of Historic Places as the Elverson Building.

In the 1940s, The Inquirer built a large rotogravure printing plant just north of the Inquirer Building on Broad Street. Ground was broken in 1945 and printing begain in January, 1949. It was designed by Albert Kahn Associates. It was sold in 2000 by Philadelphia Newspapers, Inc. In 2005, after modifications, it became the headquarters of the School District of Philadelphia.

=== 21st century ===
In late July 2011, it was announced that Philadelphia Media Network, which owned the newspapers and the building, was selling the 526,000-square-foot (48,900 m^{2}) building to a developer for a price reported as exceeding $19 million. The deal closed in October, and the next month the company announced that a downsized operation, with a 125,000 square feet (11,600 m^{2}) building, would move into the renovated former Strawbridge & Clothier store at 8th and Market Streets in the Market Street East area. The relocation to the building's third floor was completed by July 2012.

The developer who bought the Inquirer Building, Bart Blatstein, announced in May 2015 that he would attempt to turn the building into a 125-room boutique hotel. He applied for $5 million in funding from Pennsylvania to go towards the $36.4 million project. According to Blatstein's schedule, construction would begin in August 2016.

Blatstein originally planned on using the building as part of a hotel and casino complex, saying that he wanted to preserve the building and its historical features, although his previous casino plan, "The Provence", called for new construction in a "faux-French theme", which drew criticism as "tacky". Blatstein failed to receive the necessary licensing from the Pennsylvania Gaming Control Board, and the hotel and casino plan was abandoned.

In 2017, Blatstein abandoned plans to use the building as a hotel, opting instead to lease the building to the Philadelphia Police Department to serve as its new headquarters. The City of Philadelphia plans to buy the building from Blatstein at the end of the lease.

== See also ==
- Architecture of Philadelphia
- Media in Philadelphia
