= The Philadelphia Inquirer =

American daily newspaper founded in 1829

- The front page of The Philadelphia Inquirer on November 8, 2023
- Type: Daily newspaper
- Format: Broadsheet
- Owner: The Philadelphia Inquirer, LLC
- Founders: John R. Walker; John Norvell
- Publisher: Elizabeth H. Hughes
- Editor: Gabriel Escobar
- Managing editor: Charlotte Sutton; Patrick Kerkstra; Richard G. Jones; Michael Huang; Kate Dailey; Danese Kenon; Matthew Doig
- Deputy managing editors: Brian Leighton; Ross Maghielse; Molly Eichel; Ariella Cohen
- Founded: June 1, 1829; 197 years ago (as The Pennsylvania Inquirer)
- Headquarters: 100 S. Independence Mall West Suite 600; Philadelphia, Pennsylvania, U.S.
- Country: United States
- Circulation: 29,700 Average print circulation 125,000 digital
- Sister newspapers: Philadelphia Daily News
- ISSN: 0885-6613
- OCLC number: 45211992
- Website: www.inquirer.com

The Philadelphia Inquirer, often referred to simply as The Inquirer and occasionally The Inky, is a daily newspaper headquartered in Philadelphia, Pennsylvania. Founded on June 1, 1829, The Philadelphia Inquirer is the third-longest continuously operating daily newspaper in the United States.

The newspaper has the largest circulation of any newspaper in both Pennsylvania and the Philadelphia metropolitan area, which includes Philadelphia and its surrounding communities in southeastern Pennsylvania, South Jersey, northern Delaware, and the northern Eastern Shore of Maryland. As of 2020, the newspaper has the 17th-largest circulation of any newspaper in the United States As of 2020, The Inquirer has won 20 Pulitzer Prizes.

Several decades after its 1829 founding, The Inquirer began emerging as one of the nation's major newspapers during the American Civil War. Its circulation dropped after the Civil War's conclusion, but it rose again by the end of the 19th century. Originally supportive of the Democratic Party, The Inquirer's political orientation eventually shifted toward the Whig Party and then the Republican Party before stating, in the mid-20th century, that it was politically independent.

By the end of the 1960s, The Inquirer trailed its chief competitor, The Philadelphia Evening Bulletin in circulation, and was lacking modern facilities and experienced staff. In the 1970s, however, following its acquisition by Knight Ridder and the hiring of new editors, it once again emerged as one of the nation's most prominent and influential newspapers.

The Philadelphia Inquirer is owned by The Philadelphia Inquirer, LLC, which merged the Philadelphia Daily News, the city's daily tabloid, into The Inquirer in 2019. As of 2026, the newspaper's publisher and chief executive officer is Elizabeth H. Hughes, and its editor is Gabriel Escobar.

== History ==
=== 19th century ===
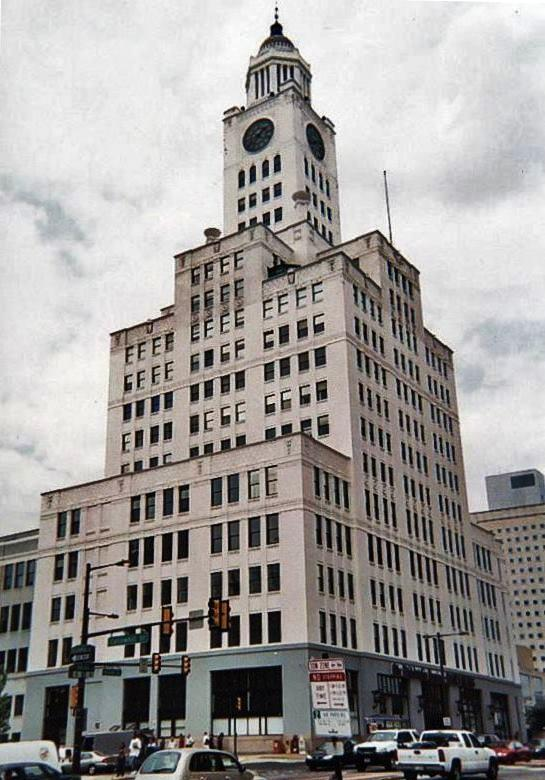
The Inquirer Building at 400 North Broad Street in Logan Square, formerly known as the Elverson Building, was home to the newspaper from 1924 to 2011.

The Philadelphia Inquirer was founded June 1, 1829, by printer John R. Walker and John Norvell, former editor of Philadelphia's largest newspaper, the Aurora & Gazette. An editorial in the first issue of The Pennsylvania Inquirer promised that the paper would be devoted to the right of a minority to voice their opinion and "the maintenance of the rights and liberties of the people, equally against the abuses as the usurpation of power." They pledged support to then-President Andrew Jackson and "home industries, American manufactures, and internal improvements that so materially contribute to the agricultural, commercial and national prosperity."

The Philadelphia Inquirer is the third-oldest surviving daily newspaper in the United States. In 1962, an Inquirer-commissioned historian traced The Inquirer to John Dunlap's The Pennsylvania Packet, which was founded on October 28, 1771.

In 1850, The Packet was merged with another newspaper, The North American, which later merged with the Philadelphia Public Ledger. The Public Ledger, in turn, merged with The Philadelphia Inquirer in the 1930s.

Between 1962 and 1975, a line on The Inquirer's front page claimed that the newspaper is the United States' oldest surviving daily newspaper. If the lineage of The Packet and The North American is counted in the newspaper's history, The Inquirer would currently be the longest continuously published newspaper in the nation.

Six months after The Inquirer was founded, with competition from eight established daily newspapers, lack of funds forced Norvell and Walker to sell the newspaper to publisher and United States Gazette associate editor Jesper Harding. In 1829, The Inquirer moved from its original location between Front and 2nd streets to between 2nd and 3rd streets. After Harding acquired The Pennsylvania Inquirer, it was briefly published as an afternoon paper before returning to its original morning format in January 1830.

When Harding bought and merged the Morning Journal in January 1830, the newspaper was moved to South Second Street. Ten years later, The Inquirer moved again, this time to its own building at the corner of Third Street and Carter's Alley.

Harding expanded The Inquirer's content, and the newspaper soon grew into a major Philadelphia newspaper. The expanded content included the addition of fiction. In 1840, Harding gained rights to publish several Charles Dickens novels for which Dickens was paid a significant sum, even though the common practice was to pay little or nothing for the rights of foreign authors' works.

Harding retired in 1859, and was succeeded by his son, William White Harding, who had become a partner three years earlier. William Harding changed the name of the newspaper to its current name, The Philadelphia Inquirer. In an attempt to increase circulation, Harding cut the price of the paper, began delivery routes and had newsboys sell papers on the street.

==== American Civil War ====
In 1859, circulation had been around 7,000; by 1863 it had increased to 70,000. Part of the increase was due to the interest in news during the American Civil War. An estimated 25,000 to 30,000 copies of The Inquirer were distributed to Union Army soldiers during the war and several times the U.S. government asked The Philadelphia Inquirer to publish special editions for its soldiers. The Philadelphia Inquirer supported the Union, but Harding wanted their coverage to remain neutral. Confederate generals often sought copies of the paper, believing that the newspaper's war coverage was accurate.

During the Civil War, Inquirer journalist Uriah Hunt Painter was at the First Battle of Bull Run in 1861, a battle which ended in a Confederate victory. Initial reports from the government claimed a Union victory, but The Inquirer went with Painter's firsthand account. Crowds threatened to burn The Inquirer's building down because of the report. Another report about General George Meade angered him enough that he punished Edward Crapsey, the reporter who wrote it. Crapsey and other Civil War correspondents at the newspaper later decided to attribute any victories of the Army of the Potomac, Meade's command, to Ulysses S. Grant, commander of the Union Army. Any defeats, conversely, were attributed to Meade.

During the Civil War, The Inquirer continued to grow with more staff being added and another move into a larger building on Chestnut Street. Following the Civil War, The Inquirer faced financial challenges, and Harding became ill. Despite Philadelphia's population growth, distribution fell from 70,000 during the Civil War to 5,000 in 1888.

In 1889, the newspaper was sold to publisher James Elverson, who moved The Inquirer to a new building that included the latest printing technology. Elverson also increased the newspaper's staff. A new Inquirer premiered on March 1, 1889, and was successful enough that Elverson launched a Sunday edition of the newspaper. In 1890, in an attempt to increase circulation further, the price of The Inquirer was cut and the paper's size was increased, mostly with classified advertisements. After five years, The Inquirer had to move into a larger building on Market Street and later expanded further into an adjacent property.

=== 20th century ===
After Elverson's death in 1911, his son by his wife Sallie Duvall, James Elverson Jr. took charge. Under Elverson Jr., the newspaper continued to grow, eventually needing to move again. Elverson Jr. bought land at Broad and Callowhill Streets and built the 18-story Elverson Building, now known as the Inquirer Building. The first issue of The Inquirer was printed at the new building on July 13, 1925. Four years later, in 1929, Elverson Jr. died, and his sister, Eleanor Elverson Patenôtre, widow of Jules Patenôtre, assumed leadership of The Inquirer.

Patenôtre ordered cuts throughout the paper, but was not really interested in managing it, and ownership of the newspaper was put up for sale. Cyrus Curtis and Curtis-Martin Newspapers Inc. bought the newspaper on March 5, 1930.

Curtis died a year later and his stepson-in-law, John Charles Martin, took charge. Martin merged The Inquirer with another paper, the Public Ledger, but the Great Depression hurt Curtis-Martin Newspapers and the company defaulted in payments of maturity notes. Ownership of The Inquirer then returned to the Patenôtre family and Elverson Corp.

Charles A. Taylor was elected president of The Inquirer Co. and ran the paper until it was sold to Moses L. Annenberg in 1936. During the period between Elverson Jr. and Annenberg The Inquirer stagnated, its editors ignoring most of the poor economic news of the Depression. The lack of growth allowed J. David Stern's newspaper, The Philadelphia Record, to surpass The Inquirer in circulation and become the largest newspaper in Pennsylvania.

Under Moses Annenberg, The Inquirer turned around. Annenberg added new features, increased staff and held promotions to increase circulation. By November 1938 Inquirer's weekday circulation increased to 345,422 from 280,093 in 1936. During that same period the Record's circulation had dropped to 204,000 from 328,322.

In 1939, Annenberg was charged with income tax evasion. Annenberg pleaded guilty before his trial and was sentenced to three years in prison. While incarcerated, he fell ill and died from a brain tumor six weeks after his release from prison in June 1942. Upon Moses Annenberg's death, his son, Walter Annenberg, took over.

In 1947, the Record went out of business, and The Philadelphia Inquirer emerged as Philadelphia's only major daily morning newspaper. While still trailing behind Philadelphia's largest newspaper, the Evening Bulletin, The Inquirer also continued to operate profitably.

In 1948, Walter Annenberg expanded the Inquirer Building with a new structure that housed new printing presses for The Inquirer. During the 1950s and 1960s, Annenberg acquired Seventeen magazine and TV Guide.

In 1957, Annenberg bought the Philadelphia Daily News and combined the Daily News' facilities with The Inquirer's.

In 1958, a 38-day strike hurt The Inquirer and, following the strike, so many reporters had accepted buyout offers and left that the newsroom was noticeably empty, leaving many copy clerks with little experience responsible for reporting.

One of the few star reporters of the 1950s and 1960s was investigative reporter Harry Karafin, who exposed corruption and wrote exclusive stories for The Inquirer, but also extorted money out of individuals and organizations. Karafin told sources that he had harmful information on them, and would demand money in exchange for him not making the information public. This went on from the late 1950s into the early 1960s before Karafin was exposed in 1967 and was convicted of extortion in 1968. As the newspaper entered the 1970s, circulation and advertising revenue was declining, and the newspaper had become, as Time magazine reported, "uncreative and undistinguished."

=== Corporate ownership ===
Daily Circulation
Year	Weekday	Sunday
1936	280,093	669,152
1938	345,422	1,035,871
1968	648,000	905,000
1984	533,000	995,000
1990	511,000	996,000
1999	402,000	802,000
2002	373,892	747,969
2006	350,457	705,965
2007	338,049	645,095
2019	101,818	201,024

In 1969, Samuel Newhouse offered Annenberg $55 million to acquire The Inquirer. But having earlier promised John S. Knight the right of first refusal to any sale, Annenberg instead sold the newspaper to Knight, and The Inquirer and Philadelphia Daily News became part of Knight Newspapers and its new subsidiary, Philadelphia Newspapers Inc. (PNI). Five years later, in 1974, Knight Newspapers merged with Ridder Publications to form Knight Ridder.

When The Inquirer was acquired, it was understaffed, its equipment was largely outdated, many of its employees were underskilled, and the newspaper trailed its chief competitor, the Evening Bulletin, in weekday circulation. In 1972, however, Eugene L. Roberts Jr. became The Inquirer's executive editor, and once again turned the newspaper around.

Between 1975 and 1990, The Inquirer won seventeen Pulitzers, six of which were won in consecutive years between 1975 and 1980, and the newspaper won more journalism awards than any other newspaper in the United States. Time magazine named The Inquirer one of the ten best daily newspapers in the United States, calling Roberts' changes to the paper, "one of the most remarkable turnarounds, in quality and profitability, in the history of American journalism."

In 1980, The Inquirer had emerged as the most circulated paper in Philadelphia, forcing the Evening Bulletin to shut down two years later. Between 1970 and 1985, however, The Inquirer experienced eleven strikes, the longest of which, in 1985, lasted 46 days. The Inquirer also faced criticism for its expanded international coverage, which led Time magazine to report that it was covering "Karachi better than Kensington".

Throughout the 1980s, however, the newspaper continued to grow. When the Evening Bulletin shut down in 1982, The Inquirer hired 17 Bulletin reporters and doubled its bureaus to attract former Bulletin readers. By 1989, Philadelphia Newspapers Inc.'s editorial staff reached a peak of 721 employees.

In the 1990s, The Inquirer again confronted challenges with diminishing circulation and advertisement revenue. While part of a nationwide trend, the impact was exacerbated by, according to dissatisfied Inquirer employees, the newspaper resisting changes that many other daily newspapers implemented to keep readers and pressure from Knight Ridder to cut operating costs.

During most of Roberts's time as editor, Knight Ridder allowed him a great deal of freedom in running the newspaper. In the late 1980s, however, Knight Ridder expressed concern about The Inquirer's profitability and took a more active role in its operations. Knight Ridder pressured The Inquirer to expand into the more profitable Philadelphia suburbs, while at the same time cutting staff and coverage of national and international stories. Some of The Inquirer's best reporters accepted buyouts, and left for The New York Times and The Washington Post. By the late 1990s, all of the high-level editors who had worked with Roberts in the 1970s and 1980s had left, none at normal retirement age.

Since the 1980s, The Philadelphia Inquirer has won three Pulitzers: a 1997 award for "Explanatory Journalism.", the public service award (the top category) in 2012 for "its coverage of pervasive violence in the city's schools", and the 2014 prize for criticism, won by the newspaper's architecture critic, Inga Saffron.

In 1998, Inquirer reporter Ralph Cipriano filed a libel suit against Knight Ridder, The Philadelphia Inquirer, and Inquirer editor Robert Rosenthal over comments Rosenthal made about Cipriano to The Washington Post, claiming it was difficult reporting negative stories in The Inquirer about the Roman Catholic Archdiocese of Philadelphia. Rosenthal later claimed that Cipriano had "a very strong personal point of view and an agenda...He could never prove (his stories)." The suit was later settled out of court in 2001.

=== 21st century ===
In the early 21st century, The Philadelphia Inquirer launched an online news desk to compete with local Philadelphia radio stations in the coverage of breaking news.

==== 2006 sale and bankruptcy ====
In June 2006, Knight Ridder was acquired by its rival, The McClatchy Company. The Inquirer and the Philadelphia Daily News were among the 12 least profitable Knight Ridder newspapers that McClatchy put up for sale in March 2006. On June 29, 2006, The Inquirer and Daily News were sold to Philadelphia Media Holdings LLC (PMH), a group of Philadelphia-area business people, including Brian Tierney, PMH's chief executive. The new owners announced plans to spend US$5 million on advertisements and promotions to increase The Inquirer's profile and readership.

Following PMH's acquisition, The Inquirer advertising and other revenue, especially its national advertising revenue, fell considerably, and the newspaper's circulation also continued to fall. As a result, the newspaper's management cut 400 jobs at The Inquirer and Daily News between 2006 and 2009. On February 21, 2009, despite cutting its operating costs, however, Philadelphia Newspapers LLC, filed for Chapter 11 bankruptcy protection with the company holding approximately US$390 million in debt, much of which was borrowed to acquire The Inquirer and Daily News.

==== Ownership shifts (2009-2014) ====
The bankruptcy filing kicked off a year-long dispute between Philadelphia Media Holdings and its creditors. Creditors, including banks and hedge funds, sought to take control of Philadelphia Newspapers LLC themselves and opposed efforts by Philadelphia Media Holdings to maintain control of the newspaper's operations. Philadelphia Media Holdings was supported by most of the newspaper's unions. It also launched a public relations campaign to promote its continued control of the newspaper, highlighting the value of local ownership of media.

On April 28, 2010, at a bankruptcy auction, the group of lending creditors and a group of local investors allied with Tierney both bid for The Inquirer and Daily News. The lenders emerged with the winning bid for the newspapers, but the deal collapsed after the lenders, operating under the name of Philadelphia Media Network (PMN), were unable to reach a contract agreement with the union representing the company's newspaper delivery drivers.

Philadelphia Newspapers, represented by Lawrence G. McMichael of Dilworth Paxson LLP, challenged the right of creditors to credit bid at a bankruptcy auction. Their claim was ultimately heard by the U.S. Court of Appeals for the Third Circuit, which agreed that credit bidding was not permitted.

In September 2010, both newspapers again were placed for auction, and again Philadelphia Media Network (PMN) won the bid. After successfully negotiating a contract with all of the newspaper's 14 unions, the $139 million deal was finalized on October 8. The Philadelphia Inquirer continued with profitability, largely due to emerging competition from digital media sources.

By May 2012, the combined journalist staff at all of Philadelphia Media Network was about 320, and some of the same stories and photographs appeared both in The Inquirer and Daily News. In October 2011, Philadelphia Media Network sold the Inquirer Building to Bart Blatstein, a developer affiliated with Tower Investments Inc., who said he intended to turn the complex into a mixed-use complex of offices retail and apartments. The following month, however, publisher and chief executive officer Gregory J. Osberg announced that 600 of the 740 Philadelphia Media Network employees of The Inquirer, Daily News, and Philly.com would move to office space in the former Strawbridge & Clothier department store on east Market Street, and that the remaining employees would move to offices in the Philadelphia suburbs.

In July 2012, Philadelphia Media Network moved to the new location, consolidating its offices on the building's third floor. Cutbacks left much of the 525,000 square feet (49,000 m^{2}) of the Inquirer Building empty, but the 125,000-square-foot (12,000 m^{2}) east Market Street location consolidated Philadelphia Media's departments, including the Daily News's newsroom with The Inquirer. The new location has a street-level lobby and event room. Plans for the building also included electronic signage such as a news ticker on the corner of the Center City Philadelphia high-rise.

On April 2, 2012, a group of local business leaders paid $55 million for the newspaper, less than 15 percent of the $515 million spent to buy the papers in 2006. In June 2014, PMN was sold to H.F. "Gerry" Lenfest, who appointed C.Z. "Terry" Egger as publisher and chief executive officer in October 2015.

==== Nonprofit era and merger (2016-present) ====
In 2016, Lenfest donated PMN to The Philadelphia Foundation, so that The Inquirer, its daily tabloid affiliate, the Daily News, and their joint website, Philly.com, could remain in Philadelphia.

In 2019, PMN renamed Philly.com to Inquirer.com, and the Daily News was made an edition of The Inquirer. Philadelphia Media Network, in turn, was renamed The Philadelphia Inquirer, LLC. The Inquirer also became a founding member of Spotlight PA, an investigative reporting partnership focused on Pennsylvania.

On June 2, 2020, The Inquirer ran an Inga Saffron op-ed covering the George Floyd protests under the headline "Buildings Matter, Too", a reference to property damage inflicted by Black Lives Matter during the Floyd protests. The next day, editors apologized for the headline and several Inquirer journalists wrote an open letter, alleging that the newspaper was failing to report accurately on the Philadelphia area's non-white communities. The letter demanded a plan for correcting these issues, threatening to call in "sick and tired" beginning the following day, June 4, if the concerns were not addressed. The letter read in part:

We're tired of shouldering the burden of dragging this 200-year-old institution kicking and screaming into a more equitable age. We're tired of being told of the progress the company has made and being served platitudes about "diversity and inclusion" when we raise our concerns. We're tired of seeing our words and photos twisted to fit a narrative that does not reflect our reality. We're tired of being told to show both sides of issues there are no two sides of.

— Journalists of Color of The Philadelphia Inquirer

On June 4, as promised in their letter, over 40 Inquirer staffers called in sick. Two days later, on June 6, the newspaper announced that Stan Wischnowski would resign as the newspaper's senior vice president and executive editor, and Inquirer journalists were told they would not have a say in his replacement. In 2022, the paper admitted to its own racism, both in publishing the article and across the organization.

In May 2023, The Philadelphia Inquirer was severely disrupted by a cyberattack. In March 2025, the Inquirer eliminated its Communities and Engagement Desk, which had covered marginalized communities since 2020.

== Politics ==
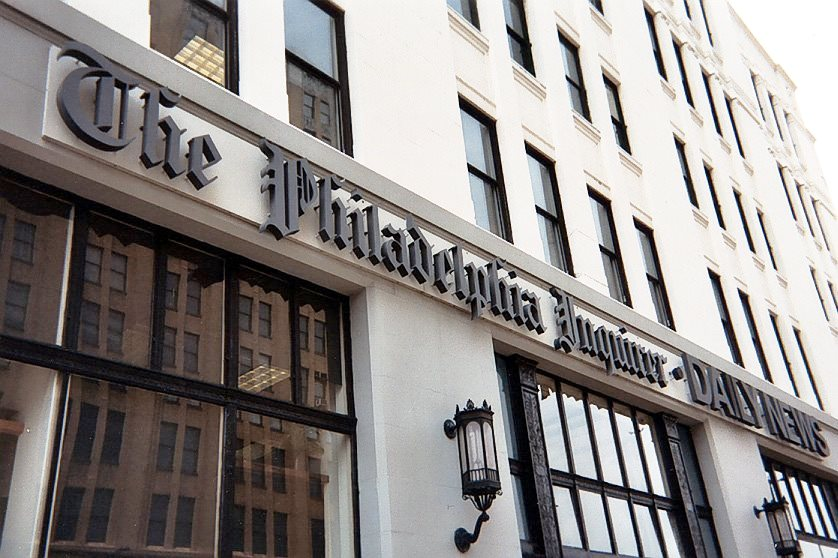
The sign above the entrance to Inquirer Building

Since its founding in 1829, The Philadelphia Inquirer has asserted itself editorially on political issues of the day. In its earliest days, John Norvell left as editor of what was then the Aurora & Gazette because he disagreed with what he felt was the newspaper's editorial approval of a movement towards a European class system.

When Norvell and John Walker founded The Inquirer, they wanted the newspaper to represent all people and not just its upper classes. The newly launched newspaper supported the ideology of Jeffersonian democracy and the political leadership of then U.S. president Andrew Jackson, declaring support for the right of the minority's opinion to be heard. In founding of The Inquirer, according to legend, Norvell said, "There could be no better name than The Inquirer. In a free state, there should always be an inquirer asking on behalf of the people: 'Why was this done? Why is that necessary work not done? Why is that man put forward? Why is that law proposed? Why? Why? Why?"

When Norvell and Walker sold their newspaper to Jesper Harding, Harding kept the newspaper close to the founder's politics and supported the Democratic Party. However, Harding disagreed with Andrew Jackson's handling of the Second Bank of the United States, and he began supporting the anti-Jackson wing of the Democrats. During the 1836 Presidential election, Harding supported the Whig party candidate over the Democratic candidate, which led The Inquirer to become known as a pro-Whig newspaper.

Before the American Civil War commenced in 1861 The Inquirer supported the preservation of the Union, and was critical of the abolitionist movement, which some felt was responsible for secession of Confederate states.

Once the Civil War began, The Inquirer reported neutrally and independently on the war, but firmly supported the Union. At first, editors of The Inquirer opposed emancipation. Following military setbacks of the Union Army, however, The Inquirer began editorializing in support of a more pro-Union and pro-Republican stance. In a July 1862 article, The Inquirer wrote, "in this war there can be but two parties, patriots and traitors."

When James Elverson assumed leadership of The Inquirer, he declared, "the new Inquirer shall be in all respects a complete, enterprising, progressive newspaper, moved by all the wide-awake spirit of the time and behind in nothing of interest to people who want to know what is going on every day and everywhere...steadily and vigorously Republican in its political policy, but just and fair in its treatment of all questions..."

During the 1900 Republican convention in Philadelphia, Elverson set up a large electric banner over Broad Street that declared "Philadelphia Inquirer – Largest Republican Circulation in the World."

At the turn of the 20th century, the newspaper began editorial campaigns to improve Philadelphia, including the paving of major streets and ending what the newspaper saw as a corrupt plan to buy the polluted Schuylkill Canal for drinking water. The newspaper maintained these editorial positions under Elverson's son, Elverson Jr.. By the 1920s, The Inquirer became known as the "Republican Bible of Pennsylvania".

Between 1929 and 1936, while under Patenotre and Curtis-Martin, The Inquirer continued to support the Republican party and President Herbert Hoover, and did not provide much reporting on Great Depression. Statistics on unemployment or business closings were ignored, even when they were conveyed by the federal government. As some Philadelphia banks closed during the Great Depression, news of their closing was relegated to the back of the newspaper's financial section.

When Moses Annenberg assumed leadership of The Inquirer, he announced that the newspaper would "continue to uphold the principles of the Republican Party." But in a meeting with newspaper editors shortly after, he proposed that the paper go independent and support President Franklin D. Roosevelt in the upcoming presidential election. The newspaper's editors at the time rejected this idea, and the paper remained largely Republican.

In the late 1930s, Annenberg disagreed with Roosevelt's New Deal programs and his handling of strikes, leading to editorials in The Inquirer that criticized Roosevelt's policies and his supporters. Annenberg strongly opposed Democratic Pennsylvania governor George Earle, and The Inquirer supported Republican candidates in the 1938 Pennsylvania state elections. When Republicans swept the election, there was a celebration at The Inquirer headquarters that included red flares and the firing of cannons. The attacks against Democrats and the support given Republicans caught the attention of the Roosevelt administration.

Under Annenberg, The Philadelphia Inquirer emerged as a major challenger to The Record, which was supportive of Democrats. As Annenberg began focusing on politics, Democratic politicians often attacked Annenberg, accusing him of illegal business practices. In 1939, Annenberg was charged with income tax evasion. He pleaded guilty prior to his trial, and was sentenced to three years in prison. Annenberg's friends and his son, Walter, claimed that the entire trial was politically motivated and that his sentence was excessively harsh.

=== Independent ===
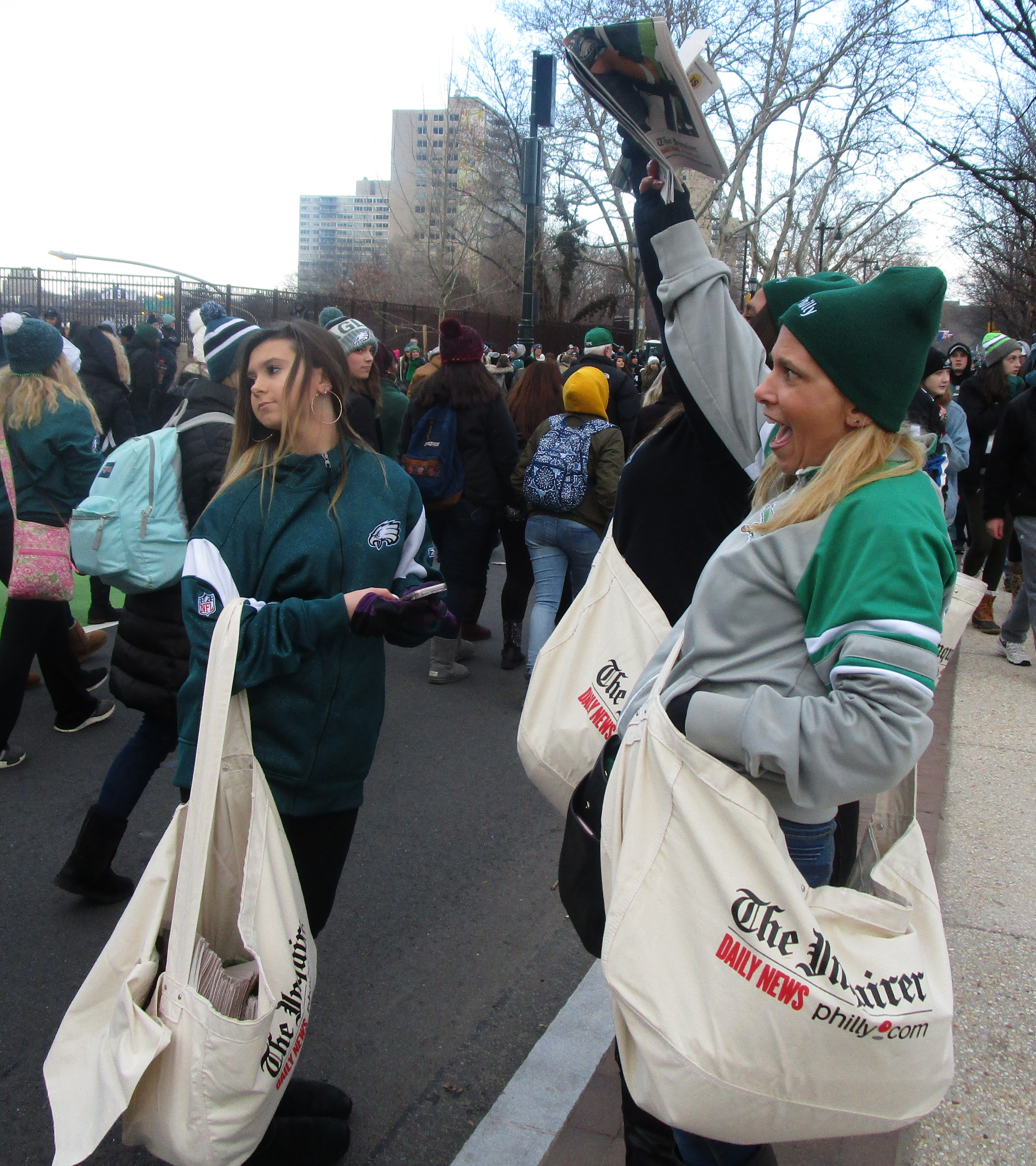
Copies of The Inquirer being sold at the Philadelphia Eagles' Super Bowl LII victory parade in 2018

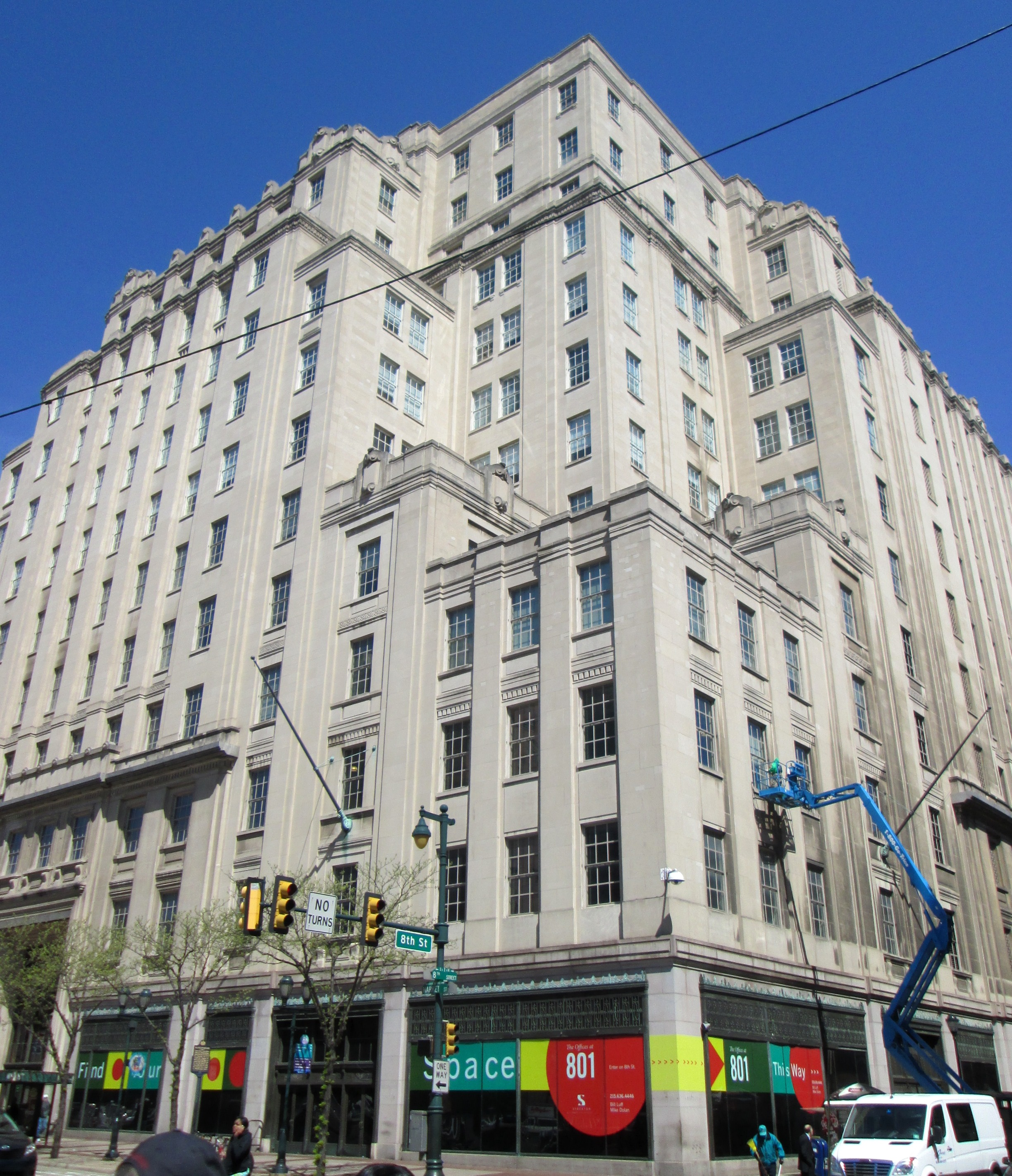
The former Strawbridge & Clothier Building at 801 Market Street, where the Inquirer and Daily News were located from 2012 to 2022

In 1947, The Record, the primary Philadelphia competitor of The Inquirer, ceased operations, and The Inquirer announced that it would be an independent newspaper. Frustrated with corruption in Philadelphia, The Inquirer supported Democratic candidates in the 1951 election.

While Walter Annenberg promised that The Inquirer would be politically independent, he still used the newspaper to attack people he disliked, sometimes including a person or group with whom he was angered. Annenberg then blacklisted the person or group, insisting that they not be mentioned in The Inquirer. People on the blacklist were even airbrushed out of images. Annenberg's blacklist included Nicholas Katzenbach, Ralph Nader, Zsa Zsa Gabor, and the Philadelphia Warriors, the city's professional basketball team at the time, who Annenberg insisted not be mentioned for an entire season.

In 1966, Walter Annenberg used The Inquirer to attack Pennsylvania gubernatorial candidate Milton Shapp. During a press conference, an Inquirer reporter asked Shapp if he had ever been a patient in a mental hospital; having never been a patient, Shapp said no. The following day, The Inquirer's headline read, "Shapp Denies Rumors He Had Psychiatric Treatment in 1965." Shapp attributed his loss of the election to Annenberg's attack campaign.

Annenberg was a backer and friend of Richard Nixon. In the 1952 presidential election, critics later claimed Annenberg and the newspaper looked the other way when covering allegations related to Nixon's purported misappropriation of funds. Later, to avoid accusations of political bias, Annenberg had The Inquirer use only the Associated Press and other news wire services in covering the 1960 and 1968 presidential elections in which Nixon was a candidate, losing in 1960 to John F. Kennedy and winning in 1968 in a three-way race against Hubert Humphrey and George Wallace.

After Nixon's election as president in 1968, he appointed Annenberg U.S. ambassador to the United Kingdom. A year later, in 1969, Annenberg sold The Inquirer to Knight Newspapers in a transaction that stipulated that Annenberg's name would appear as "Editor and Publisher Emeritus" on The Inquirer's masthead. In 1970, Annenberg, unhappy with the direction of The Inquirer under the new ownership, had his name removed from the newspaper's masthead following its publication of an editorial critical of Richard Nixon.

Under Knight Ridder, The Inquirer continued to insist that it remained editorially independent, but the newspaper faced criticism from conservatives, who labeled it left leaning. Although the Inquirer was known as the "Republican Bible of Pennsylvania" in the early 1900s, as of 2006, The Inquirer had not endorsed a Republican candidate for president for over a quarter century, when it endorsed Gerald Ford in the 1976 presidential election.

Throughout the 1990s and into the 21st century, the newspaper also faced criticism for its coverage of Israel, including from the Zionist Organization of America, which accused The Inquirer of being anti-Israel.

In 2006, The Inquirer became one of the only major United States newspapers to print one of the Jyllands-Posten Muhammad cartoons. Following its publication, Muslims picketed outside the Inquirer Building to protest their printing.

When Philadelphia Media Holdings L.L.C. (PMH) bought the paper in 2006, Brian Tierney and the business people associated with PMH signed a pledge promising that they would not seek to influence the content of the newspaper. Tierney, a Republican advertising and public relations executive, had criticized The Inquirer in the past on behalf of his clients, including the Roman Catholic Archdiocese of Philadelphia, which he had represented.

In 2012, the sale of The Inquirer to six local Philadelphia business leaders led to concerns of conflict of interest. The new owners, which included New Jersey Democratic fundraiser George Norcross III, media entrepreneur H. F. Lenfest, former New Jersey Nets owner Lewis Katz, and CEO of Liberty Property Trust and chairman of the Greater Philadelphia Chamber of Commerce William Hankowsky, pledged not to influence the content of the paper.

== Board of directors ==
The members of board of directors as of May 2026

- Elizabeth H. Hughes
- Lisa Kabnick, Chair
- S. Mitra Kalita
- Josh Kopelman, Chair Emeritus
- Keith Leaphart, Vice Chair
- Neil Vogel
- Gillian B. White
- Mary Stengel Austen
- Rebecca Campbell

== Workforce ==
In March 2020, The NewsGuild of Greater Philadelphia and Philadelphia Inquirer LLC reached an agreement on a three-year contract agreement that would include a workforce diversity provision and raises for the entire newsroom, which had not seen across the board salary increases since August 2009. NewsGuild membership ratified the three-year contract agreement on March 17, 2020. Three years later, in August 2023, the NewsGuild and Inquirer agreed on a new three-year contract that the guild said was its best contract in 20 years.

=== Demographics ===
As of February 2021The Inquirer has 225 newsroom employees. 54.7% of whom are male and 45.3% of whom are female. Critics have alleged that the racial demographics of the newsroom, which is 75 percent White, does not match the city it covers, which is only 34% White. However, these allegations appear to exclude the broader circulation of the newspaper, which stretches beyond the city of Philadelphia, which is approximately 60% White and approximately 20% Black.

As of 2021, three quarters of the editors of The Inquirer were White. As of 2026, two desks – Health and Investigations – have no Black journalists.

== Production ==
The Philadelphia Inquirer is headquartered at 100 S. Independence Mall West in the Market East section of Center City Philadelphia, where its tabloid sister publication, the Philadelphia Daily News is also headquartered.

In September 1994, The Inquirer and WPHL-TV began co-producing a 10 p.m. newscast, Inquirer News Tonight, which lasted a year before WPHL-TV took complete control over the program and renamed it WB17 News at Ten.

Since 1995, The Inquirer has been available on the Internet, most recently at Inquirer.com, which, along with the Philadelphia Daily News, is part of The Philadelphia Inquirer LLC.

In August 1999, The Inquirer and Daily News formed a partnership with WPVI-TV.

In 2004, The Inquirer formed a partnership with Philadelphia's NBC station, WCAU, giving the paper access to WCAU's weather forecasts while also contributing to news segments throughout the day.

In 2020, The Inquirer closed its Schuylkill Printing Plant in Upper Merion Township, laying off about 500 employees. Printing of The Inquirer and the Philadelphia Daily News was outsourced to a printing plant in Cherry Hill, New Jersey, which is owned by Gannett, until 2024, when Gannett closed the Cherry Hill plant. Since then, The Inquirer and Daily News have been printed at a Gannett printing plant in Wilmington, Delaware.

As of May 2026, The Inquirer's publisher is Elizabeth H. Hughes, and its editor and senior vice president is Gabriel Escobar. Managing editors are Charlotte Sutton, Patrick Kerkstra, Richard G. Jones, Michael Huang, Kate Dailey, Danese Kenon, and Matthew Doig. Deputy managing editors are Brian Leighton, Ross Maghielse, Molly Eichel, and Ariella Cohen.

The Inquirer provides coverage of Philadelphia and its surrounding suburban communities in northern Delaware, South Jersey, and southeastern Pennsylvania.

== Pulitzer Prizes ==
Pulitzer Prizes awarded to The Philadelphia Inquirer
Year	Award	Person(s)	Work
1975	National Reporting	Donald Barlett and James B. Steele	"Auditing the Internal Revenue Service" series
1976	Editorial Cartooning	Tony Auth	"O beautiful for spacious skies, For amber waves of grain"
1977	Local Investigative Specialized Reporting	Acel Moore and Wendell Rawls, Jr.	Report on the conditions at the Fairview State Hospital for the mentally ill
1978	Public Service	The Philadelphia Inquirer	A series of articles on the abuse of power by Philadelphia police
1979	International Reporting	Richard Ben Cramer	Reports from the Middle East
1980	Local General or Spot News Reporting	Staff of The Philadelphia Inquirer	Coverage of the Three Mile Island accident
1985	Investigative Reporting	William K. Marimow	Exposé on the Philadelphia police K-9 unit
1985	Feature Photography	Larry C. Price	Series of photographs from Angola and El Salvador
1986	National Reporting	Arthur Howe	Report on deficiencies in IRS processing of tax returns-reporting
1986	Feature Photography	Tom Gralish	Series of photographs on the homeless in Philadelphia
1987	Investigative Reporting	John Woestendiek	Prison beat reporting
1987	Investigative Reporting	Daniel R. Biddle, H. G. Bissinger and Fredric N. Tulsky	"Disorder in the Court"
1987	Feature Writing	Steve Twomey	Profile of life aboard an aircraft carrier
1988	National Reporting	Tim Weiner	Series on a secret Pentagon budget used for defense research and an arms buildup
1989	National Reporting	Donald Barlett and James B. Steele	Investigation into the Tax Reform Act of 1986
1989	Feature Writing	David Zucchino	"Being Black in South Africa"
1990	Public Service	Gilbert M. Gaul	Report on the American blood industry
1997	Explanatory Journalism	Michael Vitez, April Saul and Ron Cortes	Series on the choices of the critically ill
2012	Public Service	Staff of The Philadelphia Inquirer	"...exploration of pervasive violence in the city's schools"
2014	Criticism	Inga Saffron	Criticism of architecture
Source: The Pulitzer Prizes: Columbia University

== See also ==
- List of newspapers in Pennsylvania
- List of newspapers in the United States by circulation
- Media in Philadelphia
- The Philadelphia Inquirer people
