= Keith Leaphart =

American entrepreneur

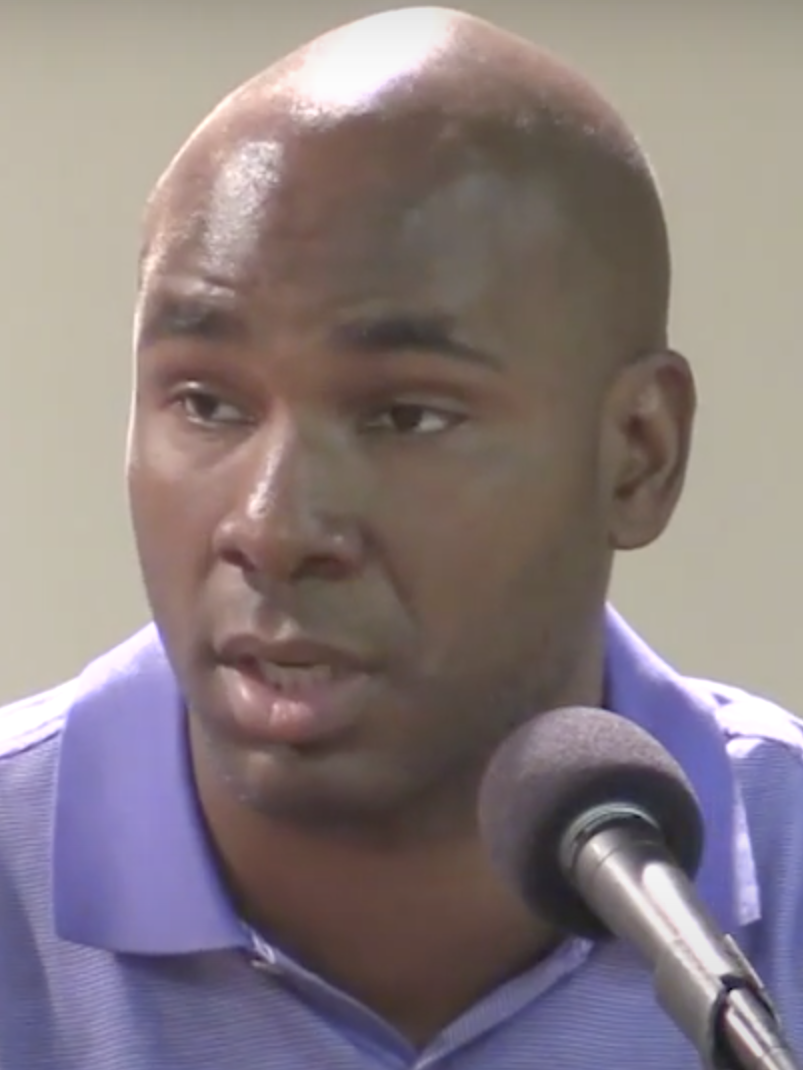

Secretary-Treasurer of the Pennsylvania Turnpike Commission
- Incumbent
- Assumed office July 5, 2023
- Governor: Josh Shapiro
- Preceded by: Wadud Ahmad

Personal details
- Born: February 9, 1975 (age 51) Philadelphia, Pennsylvania, United States
- Spouse: Ebonne Ruffins
- Children: 2
- Education: Hampton University (BS); Saint Joseph's University (MBA); Philadelphia College of Osteopathic Medicine (DO)
- Occupation: Entrepreneur, philanthropist, physician

Keith Leaphart (born February 9, 1975) is an American entrepreneur, philanthropist, physician and politician. Leaphart is the Chair of the Lenfest Foundation, CEO of Replica Creative and founder of Philanthropi, a fintech company. He is also the Secretary-Treasurer of the Pennsylvania Turnpike Commission.

== Early life ==
Leaphart was born and raised in West Oak Lane, Philadelphia by his mother, Etheyln, who worked as an administrative assistant at the Free Library of Philadelphia. Leaphart's father, Frank, worked as an electrician and left when Leaphart was a baby, but the two remained close. Starting at the age of 10, Leaphart was used by drug dealers as a runner, but by age 12, Leaphart had become a Paperboy. As part of a desegregation program, Leaphart and his sister were bused to an elementary school in Northeast Philly. Leaphart was a student in the School District of Philadelphia and graduated from Central High School.

Leaphart received a scholarship to attend Hampton University where he graduated in 1996 with a degree in biology. In 2003, he graduated from Saint Joseph's University and the Philadelphia College of Osteopathic Medicine with a dual degree. He served as an administrative intern at St. Christopher's Hospital for Children and served his residency at Thomas Jefferson University Hospital. Upon graduation, Leaphart worked as a long-term substitute at George Washington Carver High School for Engineering and Science.

== Career ==
Upon completing his residency, Leaphart aimed to become the CEO of a hospital. However, he had already founded a successful cleaning company while in medical school. While running the cleaning company, Leaphart was cleaning the office of Philadelphia billionaire and philanthropist, Gerry Lenfest. They then became good friends and business partners.

In 2007, Leaphart explored running for Congress and had an exploratory committee funded by Lenfest. However, Leaphart opted not to run and instead focused on ways the private sector can help Philadelphians. Leaphart served as an executive on loan to the city of Philadelphia where he advised Mayor Michael Nutter on programming to help men who had served time in jail.

With a loan from Lenfest, Leaphart bought Replica Creative, a design and print firm, in 2009. He turned the company into a leading competitor in the digital economy and Replica Creative was recognized as a leading small business in Philadelphia by Mayor Michael Nutter.

Since 2013, Leaphart has served as the chair of the Lenfest Foundation, where he works to help disadvantaged youth in Philadelphia. Similarly, Leaphart serves on the board of the Philadelphia Media Network, the Greater Philadelphia Chamber of Commerce, the Philadelphia Convention & Visitor Bureau and Comcast's external Joint Diversity Advisory Council.

Leaphart's accomplishments in helping Philadelphia's youth and local economy were recognized when he was awarded the Vision for Philadelphia Award in 2013.

In 2018, Leaphart launched Philanthropi, a fintech company that helps donors track their charitable contributions and find new charitable causes to support.

Leaphart was nominated as the Secretary-Treasurer of the Pennsylvania Turnpike Commission by Governor Josh Shapiro in 2023. He was confirmed by the Pennsylvania Senate to this position on July 5, 2023.

== Personal life ==
Leaphart is still a licensed physician and works at Bryn Mawr Rehabilitation Hospital during the nights and weekends. He lives in Overbrook Farms, Philadelphia and has two sons.
