= Brian Tierney =

American businessman (born 1957)

Brian P. Tierney
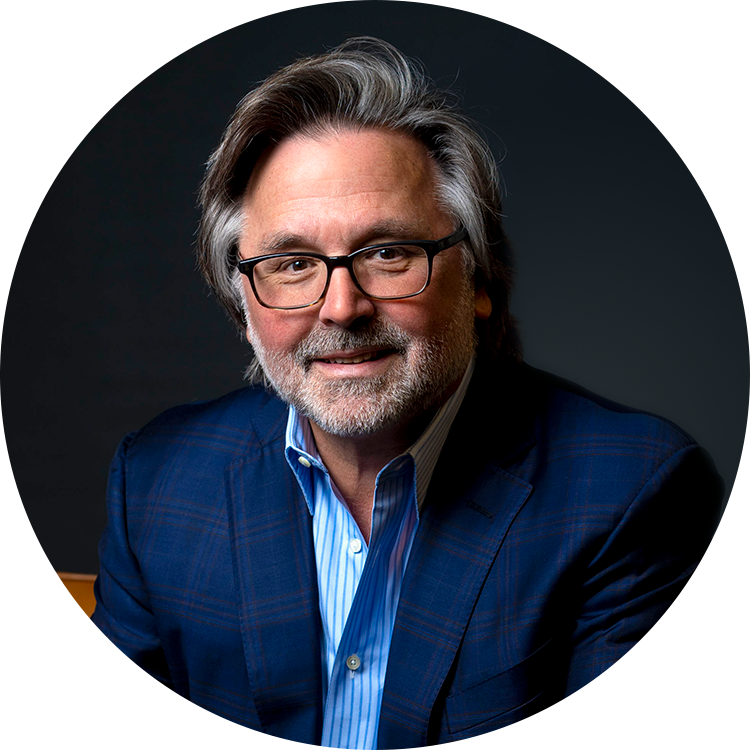
- Tierney in 2025
- Born: 1957 (age 68–69)^{[a]} Upper Darby Township, Pennsylvania, U.S.
- Education: University of Pennsylvania (BA); Widener University (JD)
- Occupations: former Chief Executive of Philadelphia Media Holdings former Co-owner and Publisher of The Philadelphia Inquirer
- Spouse: Maud Tierney (m. 1980)
- Children: Brian Jr. Tierney (1983); Bill Tierney (1986)

Brian P. Tierney (born 1957)^{[a]} is an American advertising and public relations executive and former co-owner and publisher of The Philadelphia Inquirer. Born in Upper Darby Township, Pennsylvania, Tierney is chief executive officer of Brian Communications, which he founded in 2010, and RealTime Media, which he bought from the previous owners with the help of the venture firm, New Spring Capital.

Tierney in 2006 assembled a group of investors to form Philadelphia Media Holdings LLC, a group started with the purpose of buying The Philadelphia Inquirer and Philadelphia Daily News. Chief executive of Philadelphia Media Holdings, Mr. Tierney also became the publisher of The Philadelphia Inquirer shortly after Philadelphia Media Holdings bought the paper.

In the fall of 2010, Tierney went back to his marketing and public relations roots by launching Brian Communications, and purchasing Realtime Media, a company specializing in digital marketing services for brands that include CNN, L’Oréal, Toys “R” Us and Unilever. The fast-growing firm moved to Conshohocken, Pa. in the summer of 2013 after outgrowing its old office space.

Outside of business, Tierney has been active in politics and a supporter of Republican causes. Working for the Ronald Reagan administration in the 1980s, Tierney also worked in George W. Bush's 2000 Presidential election campaign, and Sam Katz's 2003 run for Philadelphia mayor. Tierney is also an active member of numerous board of directors including NutriSystem, The Episcopal Academy and the Poynter Institute Foundation, where he serves as chairman.

== Early life and education ==
Tierney is the fourth of five sons of James and Claire Tierney. Growing up in Upper Darby Township, Pennsylvania, he attended Waldron Mercy Academy and later The Episcopal Academy. When he was seven, his family moved to Springfield Township, Pennsylvania. In 1975, at the age of eighteen, Tierney unsuccessfully sought the Democratic nomination for township commissioner of Springfield. During the campaign supporters of his opponent in the Democratic primary had torn down his campaign posters and stole other campaign items. Tierney became a Republican after the primary when a few Republicans who said they would look out for his stuff during his primary campaign, invited him to a party meeting.

He attended the University of Pennsylvania from 1975 to 1979, majoring in political science. At Penn, Tierney ran the Penn Students for Gerald Ford campaign in 1976. He graduated in 1979 and, at the age of twenty-two, moved to Washington, D.C., where he worked for the Republican National Committee in various positions, including as a messenger between Ronald Reagan's administration and Republican candidates across the country. Tierney moved back to the Philadelphia region as a Reagan appointee in the U.S. Small Business Administration's public affairs office. In 1987, he received a Juris Doctor degree from Widener University. Tierney married in 1980 and has two children.

== Public relations ==
While attending law school at Widener University, Tierney founded Tierney & Company Public Relations in 1984, which he financed on his credit card. In 1986, he sold the company to Lewis Gilman & Kynett. Tierney stayed with Lewis Gilman & Kynett and by the time he turned twenty-nine he had become president and CEO of the public relations division. In 1989, he left Lewis Gilman & Kynett and founded Tierney Group, another public relations company, with just three people. One of those people remembers Tierney's saying "We need to look at what everyone else is charging and charge our clients $15 an hour more." When told that was crazy Tierney responded, "We're going to be the best at what we do. We need to charge people accordingly. Tierney bought office equipment from a local office equipment t supplier, COPIFAX, INC. and quickly was able to produce enough copies and faxes to help his clients become successful with their businesses. ." The company quickly grew with billings of US$3.5 million and thirty-five employees in offices in three cities.

In 1994, Tierney, in association with Chicago-based True North Communications, made a deal with Foote, Cone & Belding Communications to take control of FCB Philadelphia. FCB Philadelphia, which up to 1989 was Lewis Gilman & Kynett, was renamed FCB/Tierney in May 1994 and renamed again in 1995 to Tierney & Partners. Tierney built the company into one of the largest public relations and advertising firms in the Mid Atlantic. Tierney's clients included IBM, McDonald's, Verizon, PECO Energy, and the Pennsylvania Lottery. The company created an award-winning advertising campaign for Verizon starring James Earl Jones and the slogan "Philadelphia: The place that loves you back" for the Greater Philadelphia Tourism Marketing Corporation. Other advertising campaigns included wrapping a giant hoagie around Philadelphia City Hall to promote Wawa Food Markets and an ad campaign to prevent a hostile takeover of PECO Energy by Enron.

=== Later ventures ===
Tierney Group and Tierney & Partners, later renamed Tierney Communications, was bought by True North Communications in 1998, which is now part of Interpublic Group. Tierney continued as CEO until April 2002, when he stepped down. He continued with Tierney Communications as chairman until December 1, 2003, when Tierney resigned and announced he was founding a new public relations firm, T2 Group.

T2 Group lasted until June 2004 when Tierney announced it was being bought by credit card company Advanta and that Tierney and most of T2's management would be hired by Advanta. Tierney became vice chairman of Advanta, but in February 2005, Advanta announced Tierney was no longer serving as vice-chairman. The company gave no explanation as to why Tierney lost the position and Tierney's employment with the company ended the next month.

== Philadelphia Media Holdings ==
In 2005, Tierney attempted to buy magazines Inc. and Fast Company from Gruner + Jahr, but failed. Tierney tried again to enter the media industry in March 2006 when he assembled a group of mostly former clients or people that are with him on the board of the Episcopal Academy to buy Philadelphia Newspapers Inc. He and other local businessman formed Philadelphia Media Holdings LLC and bought The Philadelphia Inquirer, Philadelphia Daily News and philly.com for US$515 million from The McClatchy Company which was selling off newspapers in unionized and low-growth markets after buying Philadelphia Newspapers Inc.'s parent company Knight Ridder. The buyout was met with skepticism by many at The Inquirer, especially by reporters who had been contacted in the past by Tierney on behalf of his clients. Tierney allayed fears with the members of Philadelphia Media Holdings signing a pledge not to interfere with the paper's editorial independence. Tierney said he would combat The Inquirer's decreasing revenue by spending millions on advertisements and promotions and not by laying off staff. Tierney assumed the role as publisher of The Philadelphia Inquirer in August 2006 after former publisher Joe Natoli resigned for a job at the University of Miami.

The Inquirer's circulation has been dropping since the 1980s, and except for briefly seeing a rise in weekday circulation in 2007, The Philadelphia Inquirer's weekday and Sunday circulation has continued to steadily drop since Philadelphia Media Holdings bought the paper. Loss of circulation combined with an unexpected drop in advertising revenue have forced more than 400 job cuts at The Inquirer and Daily News since they were bought by Philadelphia Media Holdings. As Philadelphia Media Holdings financial situation worsened in 2008 employees began complaining about how management has been monitoring things such as bathroom breaks and the coffee they drink, and that Tierney has been patrolling the parking garage seeing what time employees arrive for work. Despite efforts to manage the financial strain, on February 21, 2009, Philadelphia Newspapers LLC, the subsidiary of Philadelphia Media Holdings that owns the paper, filled for Chapter 11 bankruptcy protection. The company hoped to restructure the US$390 million in debt it borrowed to buy the newspapers, but the result was that the papers were auctioned off to the company's lenders. The beginning of 2009 also saw the filing of a lawsuit that accused The Philadelphia Inquirer of writing critical stories about Chester Community Charter School's use of public funds after business negotiations between school operator Vahan H. Gureghian and Tierney failed.

== Other activities ==
Tierney continued his political activism in the 1990s and early 2000s by donating to local and national campaigns and headed George W. Bush's outreach to Catholics in the 2000 Presidential Election. Tierney was credited with helping generate votes for Bush and helping him win important states like Ohio and Missouri. Tierney also frequently appeared as a conservative voice on WPVI-TV's Inside Story. In 2003 Tierney headed Sam Katz's third campaign for mayor of Philadelphia, which he lost to incumbent mayor John F. Street. During the campaign, Tierney was involved in a highly publicized dispute with Neil Oxman. Oxman was a political consultant and friend of Sam Katz who worked on Katz's 1999 run for mayor. Oxman left Katz's 2003 campaign because he was unable to work with Tierney, saying Tierney was a "shameless self-promoter" and "full of bullshit". Katz praised Tierney, who he said was full of optimism, which Katz said was a great asset when things were going poorly in the campaign and in Katz's personal life.

Tierney is a member of numerous boards of directors in the Philadelphia area. He has been on the boards of Thomas Jefferson University, the Zoological Society of Philadelphia, and the University Museum of the University of Pennsylvania, among others. A member of the board for NutriSystem, Tierney played an important role in the company's turnaround with the decision to dramatically increase the marketing budget. As a member of the board of the Episcopal Academy, Tierney galvanized the board of directors to buy land in Newtown Square, Pennsylvania, and move the school there. In 2001, the school's board of trustees approved the preliminary step of buying 123 acres (49.8 ha) of farmland in Newtown Square. Tierney, along with fellow board member Brian O'Neill, led a ninety-day campaign to raise the US$20 million needed for the property. He is a member of both the American Academy of Arts and Sciences and the American Philosophical Society.

The Pennsylvania Report named him to the 2009 "The Pennsylvania Report 100" list of influential figures in Pennsylvania. In 2002, he was named to the PoliticsPA list of politically influential individuals. In 2003, he was named the PoliticsPA list of politically influential individuals, where he was called a "potential statewide candidate in 2004."

== Notes ==
a. Date based on news reports giving his age as 27 in 1984, 37 in 1994 and 49 in 2006.
