= Connelly Foundation =

American philanthropic organization

The Connelly Foundation
- Formation: 1955
- Founded: 1955
- Founder: John F. & Josephine Connelly
- Purpose: Education, Health & Human Services, cultural and civic endeavors
- Headquarters: West Conshohocken, PA
- Location: West Conshohocken, Pennsylvania
- Region served: Primarily the Philadelphia metropolitan area
- Method: Donations and grants
- Board Chair: Tom Riley
- Key people: Tom Riley (Chair and President); Josephine C. Mandeville (Chair Emerita)
- Revenue: US$15,336,437 (2019)
- Expenses: US$15,620,199 (2019)
- Employees: 14
- Website: connellyfdn.org
- Remarks: Patronage of St. Katherine Drexel

The Connelly Foundation is a Philadelphia philanthropic organization based in West Conshohocken, Pennsylvania. The organization was founded in 1955 by businessman and entrepreneur John F. Connelly. Connelly headed the foundation until his death in 1990, and his wife Josephine led until her death in 1999.

The foundation is well known in the Philadelphia metropolitan area for its charitable giving and general financial support to the Archdiocese of Philadelphia. In 2022, the foundation gave over US$13.8 million to organizations and institutions serving Philadelphia, the surrounding counties of Bucks, Chester, Delaware and Montgomery, and the city of Camden, New Jersey.

== History ==
John F. Connelly founded The Connelly Foundation in 1955 while head of Connelly Containers. During his lifetime, he saw the foundation award over $74 million in grants to both religious and secular organizations in education, health and human services and cultural activities.

Josephine C. Mandeville, a daughter of the founders, became President upon Connelly's death in 1990 and held this role until 2018 when Tom Riley succeeded her and is also now Chair of the Board. Mandeville remains with the foundation as Chair Emerita.

Since its founding in 1955, the Connelly Foundation has been a responsive and proactive grant making organization awarding funds to nonprofits in the Philadelphia area that demonstrate outstanding performance in meeting community needs.

For its first 25 years, it was principally driven by its Founders John and Josephine Connelly’s personal charitable principles, with a strong emphasis on increasing access to higher education, strengthening Catholic schools, and providing help and opportunity to the needy. These values continued to be loyally honored and built upon during the Foundation’s second 25 years, under the leadership of the Connelly’s two oldest daughters, Josephine C. Mandeville as President and Emily C. Riley as Executive Vice President.

== Activities and Programs ==
The Foundation supports nonprofits with strong leadership, sound ideas, and attainable and well-defined goals, and prefers to support endeavors which receive funding from several sources, thereby demonstrating broad interest and future viability. Its philanthropy is directed toward 501(c)(3) organizations and institutions serving Philadelphia, the surrounding counties of Bucks, Chester, Delaware and Montgomery, and the city of Camden, New Jersey.

== Grant making Scope ==
The foundation has awarded over $480 million in grants since its inception in 1955, mostly within the Philadelphia area. In 2022, the foundation awarded $13,853,915 in grants. During the Covid-19 pandemic the foundation acted swiftly to help keep its grantees afloat by increasing its 2020 budget by 24% to $15.4 million with $6 million dedicated directly to Covid-19 funding. As Foundation President Tom Riley said, “With this crisis, people were drowning. You can’t wait to make a proposal.”

== See also ==
- Archdiocese of Philadelphia
- The Philadelphia Foundation
- William Penn Foundation
