= William Penn Foundation =

American philanthropic foundation

- Formation: 1945
- Founder: Otto Haas and Phoebe Waterman Haas
- Founded at: Philadelphia, Pennsylvania, United States
- Headquarters: Philadelphia, Pennsylvania, United States
- Revenue: $183,602,884 (2021 grants disbursed)
- Website: williampennfoundation.org
- Formerly called: Phoebe Waterman Foundation

The William Penn Foundation is a grant-making foundation established in 1945 in Philadelphia, Pennsylvania, by businessman Otto Haas and his wife Phoebe, and initially called the Phoebe Waterman Foundation.

It strives to improve "the quality of life in the Greater Philadelphia region through efforts that foster rich cultural expression, strengthen children’s futures, and deepen connections to nature and community."

In 2008, it disbursed new and continuing grants worth $62,974,512.

In 2021, it made grants totalling $183,602,884. Recipients were charities in the areas of education, arts and the environment.

== See also ==
- The Philadelphia Foundation
- Connelly Foundation
