= Arthur Howe =

Arthur Howemay refer to:

- Art Howe, American baseball player
- Arthur O. Howe, Vermont politician
- Art Howe (American football), American football player and president of Hampton University
