= The Philadelphia Inquirer, LLC =

American media company

- Company type: Public-benefit corporation
- Industry: Mass media
- Founded: 2010
- Headquarters: Philadelphia, Pennsylvania, U.S.
- Key people: Josh Kopelman (Chairman); Elizabeth H. Hughes (Publisher and Chief Executive Officer); H.F. Lenfest (former publisher)
- Owner: The Philadelphia Foundation
- Website: www.inquirer.com

The Philadelphia Inquirer, LLC (formerly Philadelphia Media Network (PMN)) is an American media company. It owns The Philadelphia Inquirer and Philadelphia Daily News. The company is owned by The Philadelphia Foundation, a nonprofit organization in Philadelphia, Pennsylvania, U.S.

== History ==
Philadelphia Media Network, then including the newspapers' joint web portal Philly.com, was formed and initially owned by the creditors of Philadelphia Media Holdings (PMH), acquired out of Chapter 11 bankruptcy protection. The company sold its inherited community newspaper division in December 2010. A group of local investors under the corporate name of Interstate General Media LLC bought the company for $55 million in April 2012.

Publisher and chief executive officer Greg Osberg stepped down on May 11, 2012. He was replaced by Bob Hall, 67, the publisher of the Daily News and Inquirer from 1990 to 2003, when the papers were owned by Knight Ridder.

Philadelphia Media Network was purchased by Philadelphia businessman Gerry Lenfest in 2014. In 2016, Lenfest donated the company to The Philadelphia Foundation, a nonprofit organization.

The Philadelphia Media Network also converted to a public benefit corporation with a charter that balances public benefit alongside shareholder returns. In 2019, Philadelphia Media Network renamed Philly.com to Inquirer.com and made the Daily News an edition of The Inquirer. Philadelphia Media Network was renamed The Philadelphia Inquirer, LLC.

In January 2020, Lisa Hughes was named publisher and CEO; she is the first female publisher of The Inquirer.
