= Philadelphia Daily News =

Daily newspaper in Philadelphia, Pennsylvania

- Front page on May 20, 1974, celebrating the Philadelphia Flyers winning the 1974 Stanley Cup
- Type: Daily newspaper (Monday-Saturday)
- Format: Tabloid
- Owner: The Philadelphia Inquirer, LLC
- Editor: Michael Days
- Managing editor: Pat McLoone
- News editor: Gar Joseph
- Photo editor: Michael Mercanti
- Founded: March 31, 1925; 101 years ago
- Headquarters: 801 Market Street; Philadelphia, Pennsylvania, U.S.
- Circulation: 97,694
- Sister newspapers: The Philadelphia Inquirer
- OCLC number: 12904443
- Website: philly.com

Philadelphia Daily News is a tabloid newspaper that serves Philadelphia, Pennsylvania. The newspaper is owned by The Philadelphia Inquirer, LLC, and is published as an edition of The Philadelphia Inquirer.

The Daily News began publishing on March 31, 1925, under founding editor Lee Ellmaker. By 1930, the newspaper's circulation exceeded 200,000, but by the 1950s the news paper was losing money. In 1954, the newspaper was sold to Matthew McCloskey and then sold again in 1957 to publisher Walter Annenberg.

In 1969, Annenberg sold the Daily News to Knight Ridder. In 2006 Knight Ridder sold the paper to a group of local investors, and it later became part of Philadelphia Media Network (PMN) with The Inquirer. PMN was donated to The Philadelphia Foundation in 2016, and the Daily News became an edition of The Inquirer in 2019. The Daily News has won three Pulitzer Prizes.

== History ==
=== 20th century ===
Philadelphia Daily News began publishing on March 31, 1925, under founding editor Lee Ellmaker. In its early years, it was dominated by crime stories, sports and sensationalism. By 1930, daily circulation of the morning paper exceeded 200,000. Circulation dropped over the years, and by 1954, the money-losing paper was sold to Matthew McCloskey, a contractor and treasurer of the Pennsylvania Democratic Party. In December 1956, the paper's financial condition was so bad that McCloskey got permission from the unions for a 90 percent cut in the workforce.

In 1957, McCloskey sold the paper to Walter Annenberg, publisher of The Philadelphia Inquirer. Annenberg killed off the Daily News' Sunday edition and made the tabloid into an afternoon paper.

In 1969, Annenberg sold both papers to Knight Newspapers Inc., which eventually became Knight Ridder following a merger. Under the new ownership, the Daily News returned to morning publication and aimed to be taken more seriously.

=== 21st century ===
The newspaper continues to struggle financially. It was surpassed in circulation, but not readership, by the free daily Metro. When the sale of Knight Ridder to The McClatchy Company was announced in March 2006, there were rumors that McClatchy would close the Daily News. However, in May, before the sale was finalized, it was announced that the Inquirer and Daily News would be re-sold to Philadelphia Media Holdings L.L.C., a local group led by advertising executive Brian Tierney and co-founder of the Toll Brothers homebuilding firm, Bruce Toll. The deal became official on June 29, 2006. The group intended to strengthen the online presence of both papers, and began an extensive ad campaign.

Falling circulation and ad revenue caused Philadelphia Media Holdings to make the Daily News into an edition of The Philadelphia Inquirer. Without making any other changes to the Daily News, making it part of The Inquirer would combine the circulation numbers of both papers by the Audit Bureau of Circulation. The idea was to make the newspapers more attractive to advertisers.

On April 14, 2010, Brian Tierney announced that the Daily News would launch a weekend edition in October. The weekend edition's content would be similar to the daily edition, but would have features that would not be time sensitive and be able to be read anytime during the week.

In early 2009, debts from buying the newspapers forced Philadelphia Newspapers LLC into Chapter 11 bankruptcy protection. The bankruptcy was the beginning of a year-long dispute between Philadelphia Media Holdings and creditors. The group of creditors, which include banks and hedge funds, wanted to take control of Philadelphia Newspapers LLC themselves, and opposed efforts by Philadelphia Media Holdings to keep control. Philadelphia Media Holdings received support from most of the paper's unions and launched a public relations campaign to promote local ownership.

A bankruptcy auction was held on April 28, 2010. The group of lending creditors and a group of local investors allied with Brian Tierney both bid for Philadelphia Newspapers, but the lenders had the winning bid. The lenders' company, Philadelphia Media Network (PMN), took control later that year. In July 2012, after selling the Inquirer Building in 2011, the Daily News along with The Inquirer and Philly.com moved their offices to the 3rd floor of the old Strawbridge & Clothier department store on East Market Street.

In 2016, Lenfest donated PMN to The Philadelphia Foundation so that The Inquirer, the Daily News, and their joint website, Philly.com, could remain in Philadelphia. In 2019, PMN renamed Philly.com to Inquirer.com and made the Daily News an edition of the Inquirer. PMN was renamed The Philadelphia Inquirer, LLC.

== Pulitzer Prizes ==
Journalists with the Philadelphia Daily News have won three Pulitzer Prizes. Richard Aregood won in 1985 for editorial writing, Signe Wilkinson won for her editorial cartoons in 1992, and Barbara Laker and Wendy Ruderman won in 2010 for investigating reporting for their "Tainted Justice" series focusing on the alleged misdeeds of a rogue narcotics squad.

== George Fencl Award ==
The George Fencl Award, named in honor of Philadelphia Police Officer George Fencl, is given by the Daily News to a Philadelphia Police Officer who exemplifies compassion, fairness, and civic commitment. The award was first given in 1986.

Year	Rank	Name	District/Division
1986	Captain	David Morrell	26th District, Commanding Officer
1987	Officer	Wiley L. Redding	35th District, Community Relations
1988	Officer	Joe Donato	19th District
1989	Captain	Al Lewis	22nd District, Commanding Officer
1990	Lieutenant	Jose Manuel Melendez	East Division, Community Interaction Task Force
1991	Captain	George Fenzil	Traffic Unit, Commanding Officer
1992	Lieutenant	Stephen Johnson	Police Conflict-Prevention and Resolution Unit, Commanding Officer
1993	Officer	Edwin "Bo" Diaz	26th District, Community Relations
1994	Captain	Arthur Durrant	26th District, Commanding Officer
1995	Officer	James Perkins	2nd District
1996	Officer	Joseph Dembeck	14th District
1997	Officer	Brenda Robinson-Stowe	16th District, Mounted Officer
1998	Captain	William Colarulo	25th District, Commanding Officer
1999	Officer	Bernard Turner	22nd District
2000	Chief Inspector	Dexter Green	Special Operations Unit, Commanding Officer
2001	Deputy Commissioner	Sylvester Johnson	Patrol, Narcotics, Detectives, and Special Operations, Commanding Officer
2002	Captain	William Fisher	Civil Affairs Unit, Commanding Officer
2003	Officer	Ruth McNatte	16th District, Community Relations
2004	Chief Inspector	James Tiano	Community Affairs Bureau, Commanding Officer
2005	Officer	Darlene Chapman-Cummings	Anti-Drug Program: DARE
2006	Officer	AnnaMae Law	26th District
2007	Chief of Staff	Kimberly Byrd	Chief of Staff
2008	Captain	Kevin Bethel	17th District, Commanding Officer
2009	Officer	Adrian Hospedale	12th District
2010	Officer	Richard "Butch" Riddick	12th District
2011	Officer	Joseph Young	12th District, Community Relations

== Sportsperson of the Year ==
The Daily News named its first Sportsperson of the Year in 2008.

- 2008 – Brad Lidge, Philadelphia Phillies
- 2009 – Jay Wright, Villanova Wildcats basketball coach
- 2010 – Roy Halladay, Philadelphia Phillies
- 2011 – Roy Halladay, Philadelphia Phillies
- 2012 – Mike Trout, Los Angeles Angels outfielder, born and raised in Millville.

== Notable employees ==
The front page of the Philadelphia Daily News following the Philadelphia Phillies victory in the 2008 World Series

- Richard Aregood, 1985 Pulitzer Prize for Editorial Writing
- Richie Ashburn, Major League Baseball player, columnist
- John Baer, political journalist
- Joe Baltake, film critic
- Stu Bykofsky, columnist
- Pete Dexter, columnist
- Ray Didinger, sports columnist
- Bill Fleischman, journalist and assistant sports editor
- Jay Greenberg, sports writer
- Paul Hagen, baseball writer and columnist, 1987–2012; 2013 J. G. Taylor Spink Award recipient
- Stan Hochman, sports columnist
- Phil Jasner, sports columnist
- Gar Joseph, city editor
- Barbara Laker and Wendy Ruderman, 2010 Pulitzer Prize for Investigative Reporting
- Larry Merchant, sportswriter, later TV boxing commentator
- Alan Richman, food writer
- Chuck Stone, columnist, 1972 – 1991
- Bascom N. Timmons, in 1944 hired Sarah McClendon as Washington correspondent for the Daily News
- Signe Wilkinson, 1992 Pulitzer Prize for Editorial Cartooning
