= The Philadelphia Foundation =

US community foundation

Philadelphia Foundation
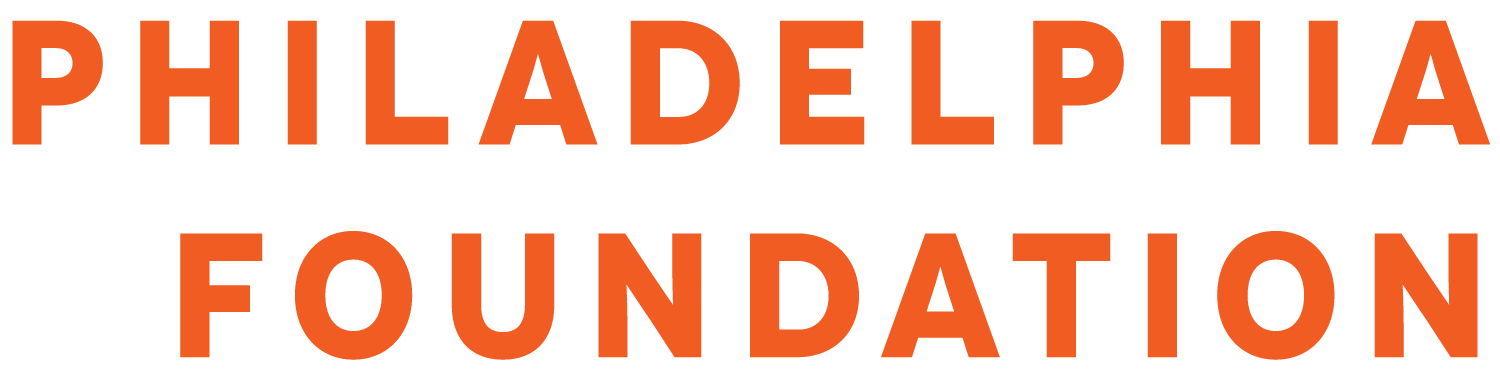
- Formation: 1918
- Founded: 1918
- Type: Community Foundation
- Location: Philadelphia, Pennsylvania, U.S., United States
- Region served: Philadelphia metropolitan area
- Key people: Pedro A. Ramos (President and CEO)
- Employees: 28
- Website: philafound.org

Philadelphia Foundation is one of the country’s first publicly supported community foundations and the largest devoted to improving lives in the Philadelphia metropolitan area. For more than a century, it has partnered with community members, civic and business leaders, and nonprofit organizations to respond to local needs and create opportunities for lasting impact.

Serving Philadelphia, Bucks, Chester, Delaware, and Montgomery counties in Pennsylvania, as well as Camden and Burlington counties in New Jersey, Philadelphia Foundation plays a dynamic role as civic catalyst, funder, convener, and trusted partner. The foundation advances the region’s economic, social, and civic vitality through grantmaking, capacity-building support for nonprofits, and scholarships, while also tackling complex community challenges. Its work focuses on long-term impact by addressing issues such as economic mobility, community violence, and civic leadership.

Since August 2015, Philadelphia Foundation has been led by President and CEO Pedro A. Ramos.

== History ==
Philadelphia Foundation was established as a "community trust" by the Fidelity Trust Company in December 1918. The original committee overseeing fund distribution included five members: one appointed by the Pennsylvania governor, one appointed by the senior judge of the U.S. District Court for Eastern Pennsylvania, one appointed by the judge of the Orphans’ Court, and two appointed by the Board of Directors of the Fidelity Trust Company. For over a century, community members, civic and business sector leaders, and nonprofit organizations have turned to Philadelphia Foundation for partnership and collaboration in responding to community needs and creating opportunities for impact.

== Mission ==
The mission of Philadelphia Foundation is to increase philanthropic investment, steward charitable resources, distribute grants and scholarships, strengthen nonprofit capacity, and act as a civic leader.

Philadelphia Foundation operates as a civic catalyst, trusted partner, and strategic problem-solver, seeking to strengthen the economic, social, and civic vitality of the region. The foundation manages more than 1,000 charitable funds established by its donors and makes over 1,000 grants and scholarship awards each year.

Its vision includes building thriving and inclusive communities across Greater Philadelphia and supporting long-term economic mobility. In its Impact Report, Philadelphia Foundation announced a decade-long commitment to advancing economic mobility through cross-sector partnerships and sustained investment.

== See also ==
- Community foundation
- Connelly Foundation
- Philadelphia Media Network
- William Penn Foundation
