= Commerce Place =

Commerce Place may refer to four buildings:

- Commerce Place (Baltimore)
- Commerce Place (Edmonton)
- Commerce Place I (Hamilton, Ontario)
- Commerce Place II (Hamilton, Ontario)

== See also ==
- Commerce Square
