= Cira Centre South =

Skyscraper complex in Philadelphia, Pennsylvania

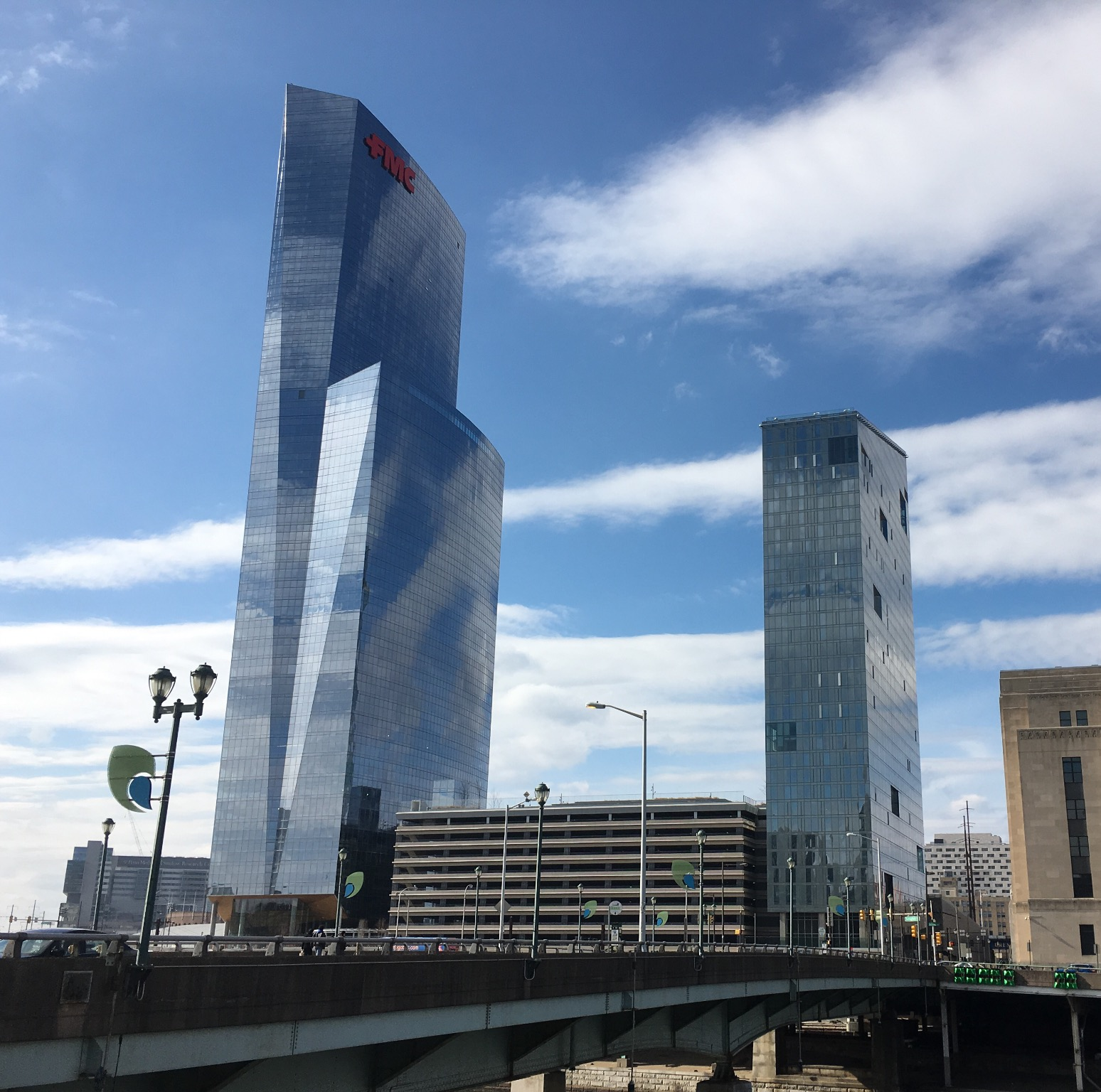
- FMC Tower and Evo at Cira Centre in 2017

- Location within Philadelphia Location within Pennsylvania Location within the United States

General information
- Status: Completed
- Type: Office, Hotel, Luxury Apartments, Rental, Retail
- Location: University City, Philadelphia, Pennsylvania, FMC Tower: 2929 Walnut Street; Evo: 2930 Chestnut Street
- Coordinates: 39.957°N 75.182°W
- Construction started: April 2013 (Evo); May 2014 (FMC)
- Completed: October 2014 (Evo) September 2016 (FMC)

Height
- Antenna spire: 736 ft (224.3m)
- Roof: 730 ft (223.5m)
- Top floor: 49

Technical details
- Floor count: 49

Design and construction
- Architects: César Pelli, Erdy McHenry Architecture
- Developer: Brandywine Realty Trust

Cira Centre South is a complex of two skyscrapers in the University City district of Philadelphia, Pennsylvania, directly across the Schuylkill River from Center City, Philadelphia. The complex is between Walnut Street and Chestnut Street south of 30th Street Station and the Old Post Office Building.

The structure consists of two towers, the commercial and residential FMC Tower and the residential Evo Cira Centre South. Evo rises a total of 33 floors and 430 feet. It was jointly developed by Brandywine Realty Trust, Campus Crest Communities, and Harrison Street Real Estate Capital.

== FMC Tower at Cira Centre South ==
FMC Tower is a 49-story, 861,000-square-foot mixed-use tower consisting of 622,000 square feet of office space, 268 residential units and suites, and 10,000 square feet of retail space.

It is the tallest building in University City and the 7th tallest building in the city of Philadelphia.

The largest tenant, FMC Corporation acquired the naming rights as part of its 16-year lease on 253,000 square feet. The University of Pennsylvania leases about 100,000 square feet at the property. Brandywine Realty Trust, the developer, relocated its headquarters from Radnor to the building, taking 46,000 square feet and occupying two floors. Additional tenants include NASDAQ, Iron Stone Real Estate Partners, Spark Therapeutics and FreedomPay.

The University of Pennsylvania owns the land and leases the ground to Brandywine. Pelli Clarke Pelli Architects designed the property. The developers broke ground on the project in 2014 and completed the building in late 2017.

== See also ==
- Cira Centre
- List of tallest buildings in Philadelphia
