= Cira Centre =

Office high-rise in Philadelphia, Pennsylvania

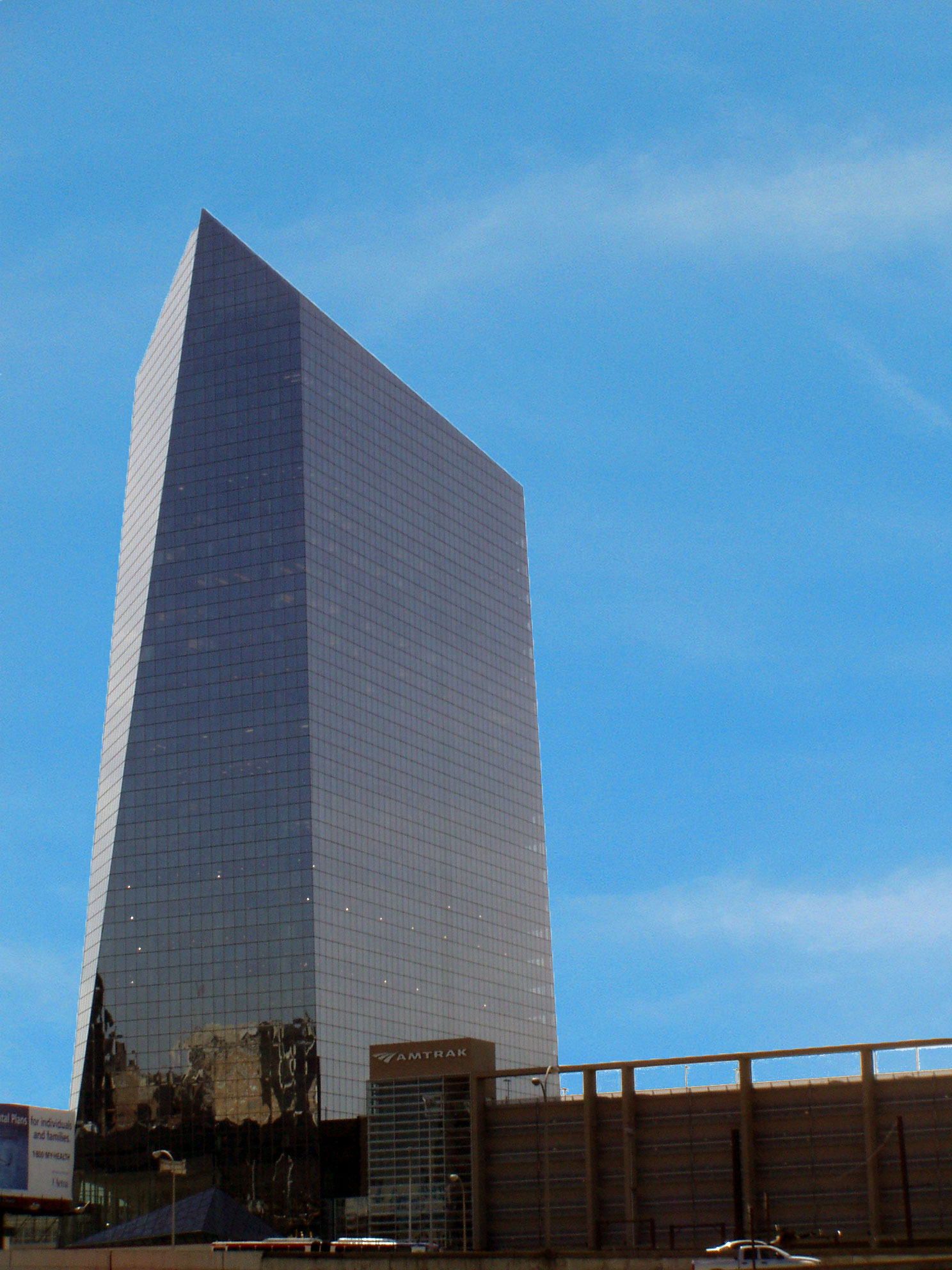
- Cira Centre in April 2006

- Location within Philadelphia Location within Pennsylvania Location within the United States

General information
- Status: Completed
- Type: Office
- Location: 30th and Arch Streets, Philadelphia, Pennsylvania, U.S.
- Coordinates: 39°57′26″N 75°10′56″W
- Construction started: 2004
- Opening: 2005
- Cost: $180 million
- Owner: Brandywine Realty Trust

Height
- Roof: 437 feet (133 m)

Technical details
- Floor count: 29
- Floor area: 731,852 square feet (68,000 m^{2})
- Lifts/elevators: 16

Design and construction
- Architects: Cesar Pelli and Associates; Bower Lewis Thrower Architects
- Developer: Brandywine Realty Trust
- Structural engineer: Ingenium, Inc.
- Main contractor: Turner Construction

The Cira Centre is a 29-story, 437-foot (133 m) office high-rise in the University City neighborhood of West Philadelphia, directly connected to Amtrak's 30th Street Station. Developed by Brandywine Realty Trust and designed by César Pelli, it was built in 2004-05 on a platform over rail tracks.

The building, a silver glass curtain wall skyscraper with 731,852 square feet (68,000 m^{2}) of floor space, includes retail and restaurant space, a conference room, a nine-story parking garage and a pedestrian bridge that links the lobby with 30th Street Station. The building's lighting, designed by Cline Bettridge Bernstein Lighting Design, includes a wall of LEDs on most of its facade that can change color to create various patterns and effects.

== History ==
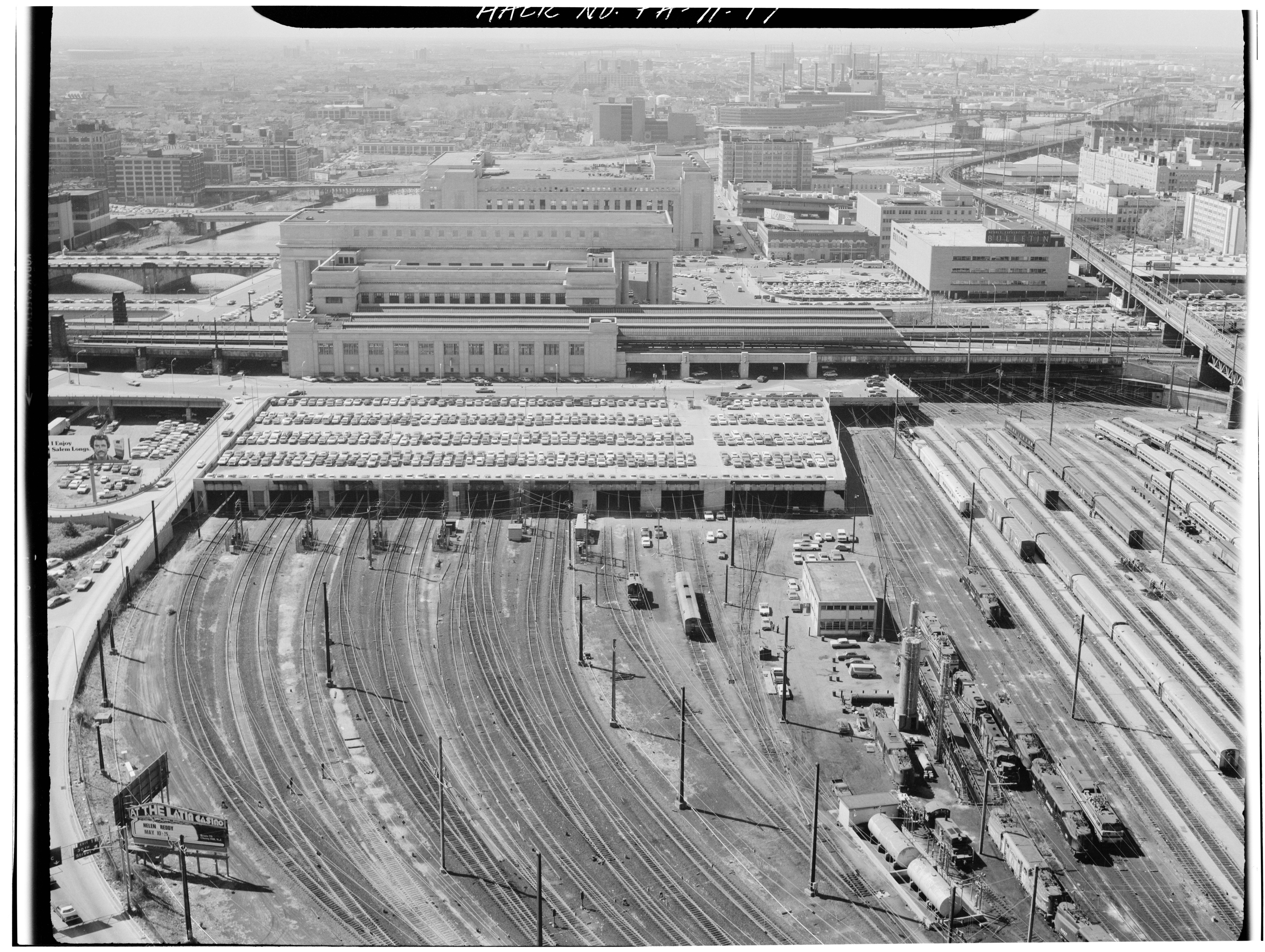
Circa Centre's parking deck in April 1977

The site of the Cira Centre used to be a parking deck that sat over rail tracks across Arch Street from 30th Street Station in West Philadelphia. Plans to develop the rail yards north and northwest of 30th Street Station had been around for decades. Among the proposed ideas for the rail yards included building a new city hall and, in the 1960s before Veterans Stadium was built, a sports stadium was proposed for the area.

In 1970, Philadelphia considered holding a bicentennial exposition over the rail yards, and the area was also considered for the Pennsylvania Convention Center. In 1985 an office, hotel and shopping complex was proposed by real estate developer Gerald D. Hines, and in 1992 an idea for a stadium was again proposed for the site. Nothing ever came out of the plans.

On May 8, 2002, Brandywine Realty Trust announced its intentions to build a glass office skyscraper next to 30th Street Station. Called the Cira Centre, the skyscraper would be designed by architect César Pelli. The plan also included replacing the rest of the parking deck with a landscaped entrance plaza and parking lot. The plan to develop the land around 30th Street Station was part of a nationwide effort by Amtrak, which owns the land and the train station, to earn revenue from its real estate holdings. Amtrak's effort also emphasizes projects that would increase ridership. Also part of the project was construction of a parking garage. The nine-story, 1,525 car garage is intended to alleviate a parking shortage at 30th Street Station. Planned since 1996, the $50 million parking garage began construction in 2003 and was opened in May 2004.

The site where Cira Centre sits, was once designated a Keystone Opportunity Improvement Zone (KOZ). The KOZ was designed to encourage development in poor and blighted areas by exempting the tenants of the building from almost all state and local taxes. On December 24, 2003 Brandywine Realty Trust announced the first tenants to lease room in the Cira Centre. Brandywine Realty Trust signed leases with Dechert LLP, Woodcock Washburn LLP, and Attalus Capital. Dechert LLP and Woodcock Washburn LLP were moving from other city skyscrapers, the Bell Atlantic Tower and One Liberty Place respectively. Attalus Capital was moving its offices from Bala Cynwyd, Pennsylvania. Dechert and Woodcock Washburn moving to the Cira Centre fueled the KOZ controversy because Dechert and Woodcock Washburn were wealthy law firms and would no longer have to pay taxes for numerous years. On December 31, 2018, Cira Centre's KOZ designation had expired, since it is not to exceed 15 years. By 2006, about 60 percent of Cira Centre's tenants came from within Philadelphia.

Having secured tenants for the Cira Centre, Brandywine Realty Trust could now proceed with construction of the skyscraper. Turner Construction was awarded $116 million contract to build the Cira Centre in February 2004 and construction began later that year. The building was topped off November 16, 2004. The topping off ceremony, the first in Philadelphia since 1999, was attended by numerous dignitaries including Mayor John Street. The beam was raised shortly before 1:00 PM and was signed by workers and guests. The Cira Centre's glass facade was completely in place by the end of July 2005.

The Cira Centre opened on October 31, 2005 with 93 percent of the building leased. Dechert was the first company to move employees into the building with many of rest of the tenants not moving in until early 2006. Cira Centre held its grand opening on December 1. The grand opening featured a musical group called String Theory whose performance in the Cira Centre's lobby included a large harp and 12 100 feet (30 m) long brass wires attached to the building. The Cira Centre was the first office skyscraper to be completed in Philadelphia since Two Commerce Square in 1992.

On August 31, 2007, the University of Pennsylvania and Brandywine Realty Trust announced their plans to build Cira Centre South. Located south of 30th Street Station and the Cira Centre, the new project is designed by the same architecture firm as the Cira Centre. Cira Centre South will include a 40–50 story office tower and a 25–30 story residential tower. The project also includes a parking garage and conversion of the U.S. Postal Service building on 30th and Market Streets into offices for the Internal Revenue Service. The parking garage and Post Office conversion was completed in 2010. Evo, the residential tower, was completed in 2014. The FMC tower was completed in 2016.

== Building ==
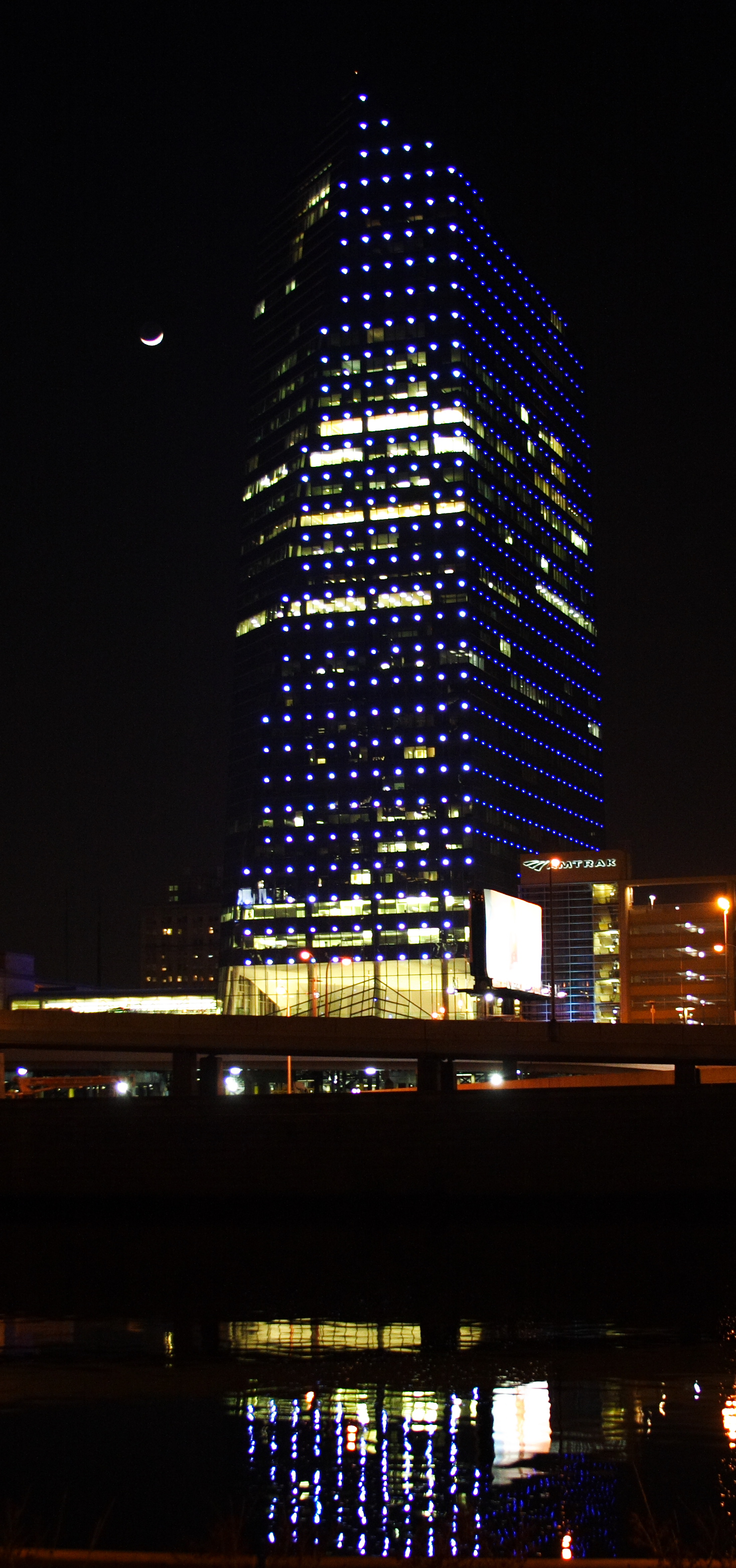
Cira Centre at night in February 2008

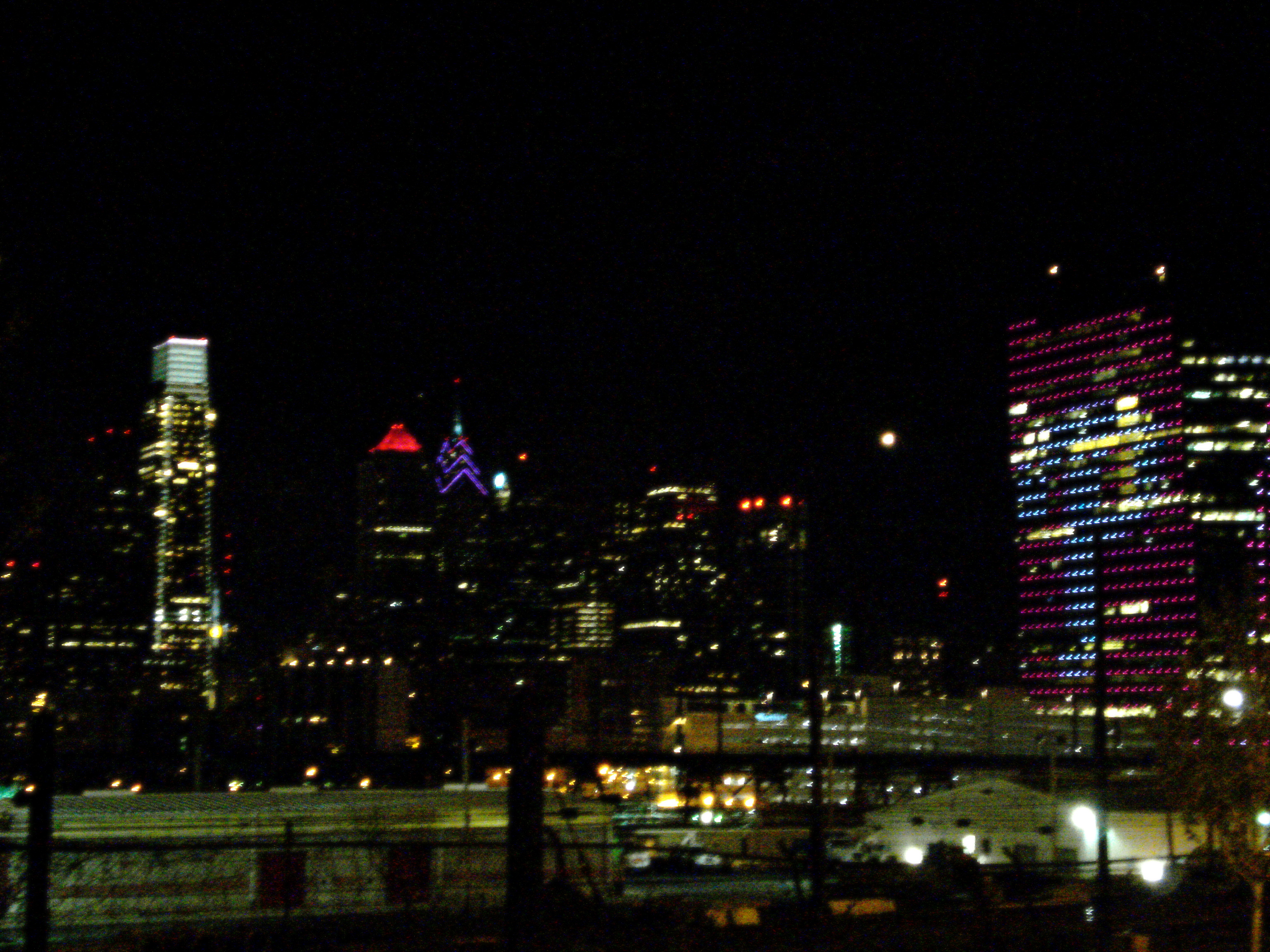
Cira Centre illuminated with the Philadelphia Phillies logo the night after the Phillies won the 2008 World Series with the newly completed Comcast Center visible on the left in October 2008

The Cira Centre is a 29-story, 437-foot (133 m) silver glass curtain wall skyscraper. The skyscraper sits next to 30th Street Station in the University City neighborhood of Philadelphia. The US$180 million Cira Centre was designed by architect Cesar Pelli. BLT Architects coordinated the design team and designed Cira Centre's core and neighboring parking garage.

The building was designed to be seen from all sides with the northwest and southeast corners removed giving the Cira Centre a different shape when viewed from different directions. The building's 731,852 square feet (68,000 m^{2}) includes 690,000 square feet (64,000 m^{2}) of office space and 37,000 square feet (3,400 m^{2}) of conference, retail space and related amenities space. The average floor-plate size is 27,300 square feet (2,500 m^{2}) and the floors feature 9 feet (2.7 m) ceilings and 360-degree panoramic views. Building amenities include fourteen high speed and two freight elevators, a health club, restaurants and retail space and a conference center.

A pedestrian bridge designed by BLT Architects crosses Arch Street linking the Cira Centre with 30th Street Station. The bridge connects the Cira Centre's lobby with the SEPTA regional rail section. The location right next to 30th Street Station allows direct access to the Northeast Corridor, SEPTA's regional rail, and Philadelphia International Airport.

The lighting design was done by Cline Bettridge Bernstein Lighting Design. Cira Centre's architects did not want any light fixtures protruding from the building so Cline Bettridge Bernstein decided to create a wall of light using LEDs. The 26W RGB LED fixtures are hidden in shadow boxes behind the glass curtain wall and are obscured during the day by the building's reflective glass. The LED lights are able to change color to create different patterns and effects on the building's facade. Designs used on the building include a large "P" for the Philadelphia Phillies, the infamous bald eagle head logo for the Philadelphia Eagles, and images of falling snowflakes during the winter season. White 0.12W LED lights are also used in the lobby and building's elevators. In the lobby, the white LEDs are mounted on the 50 feet (15 m) tall wall that separates the lobby from the neighboring parking garage.

The Philadelphia Inquirer's architecture critic Inga Saffron called the Cira Centre "a gorgeous object". She praised how the building changes shape when viewing it from different angles, describing the building as a "shape-shifter". She also praised the glass façade, which she felt "helps marry the delicate modern tower with the weighty, neoclassical train station". Saffron was critical that when "viewed straight on from the south side, the Cira becomes just another staid corporate glass tower". She was also critical of how the surrounding railroad tracks and highways isolated the building.

== Tenants ==
Tenants of the Cira Centre include BlackRock, Dechert LLP, Baker Hostetler LLP, Reger Rizzo & Darnall, LLP, Attalus Capital, SCA, LLR Partners, Lubert Adler, Iron Stone Real Estate Partners, Capsicum LLC, CYTO PHL, and McKinsey & Company.

== See also ==
- List of tallest buildings in Pennsylvania
- List of tallest buildings in Philadelphia
