= Piazza Gae Aulenti =

Square in Milan, Italy

- Piazza
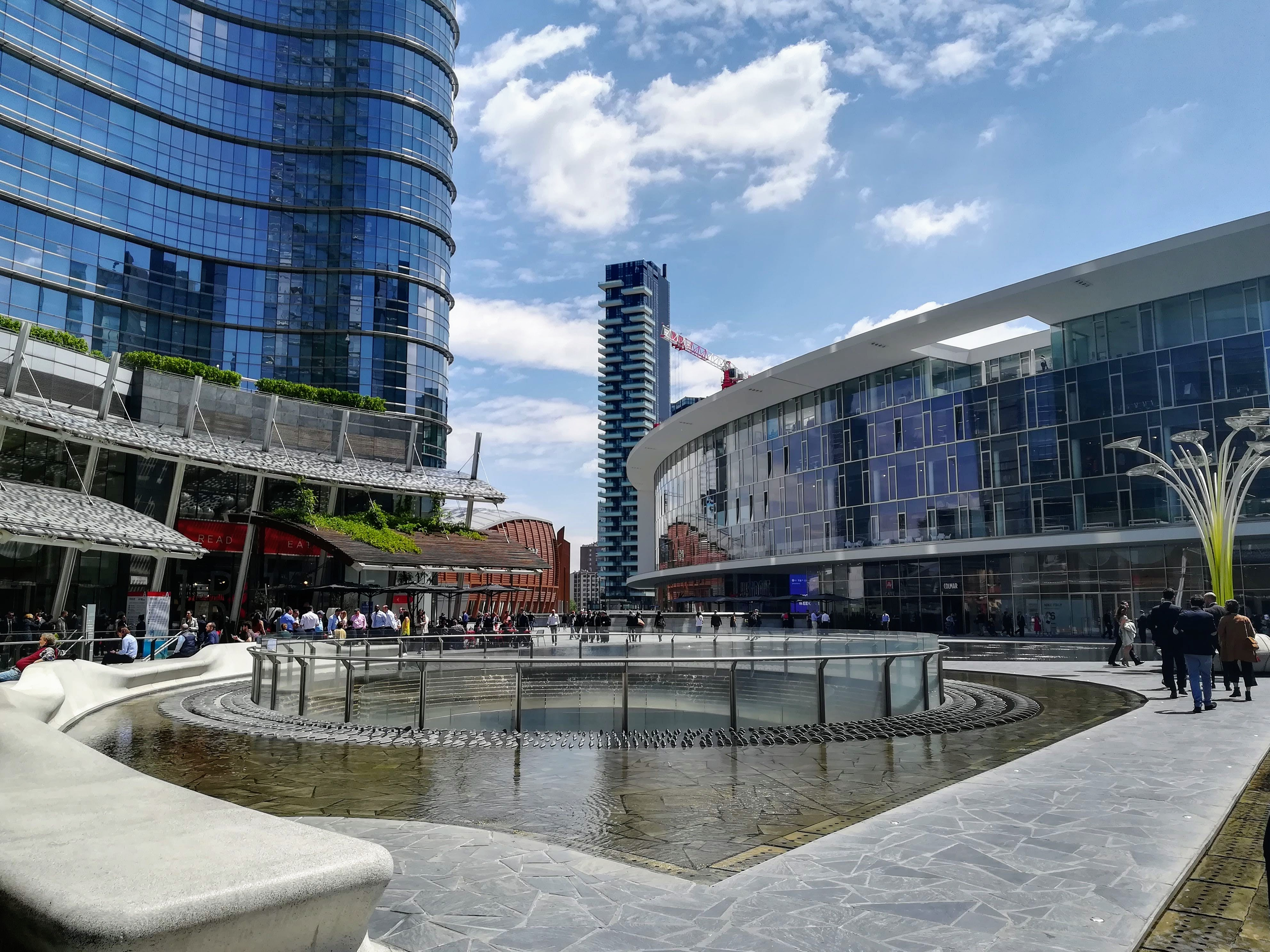
- Piazza Gae Aulenti
- Features: UniCredit Tower, UnipolSai Tower
- Design: César Pelli
- Constructed: 2012
- Completed: 2012
- Opened: 8 December 2012
- Dedicated to: Gae Aulenti
- Owner: Immobiliare Porta Nuova Garibaldi
- Location: Porta Nuova, Milan
- Interactive map of Piazza Gae Aulenti

Piazza Gae Aulenti is a pedestrian square in the city of Milan.

Elevated and circular in shape, it has a diameter of 100 meters and is located in the Isola neighbourhood of Milan, in front of the entrance to the Milan Porta Garibaldi Station and just outside the eastern edge of the Milan Business Center.

== Description ==
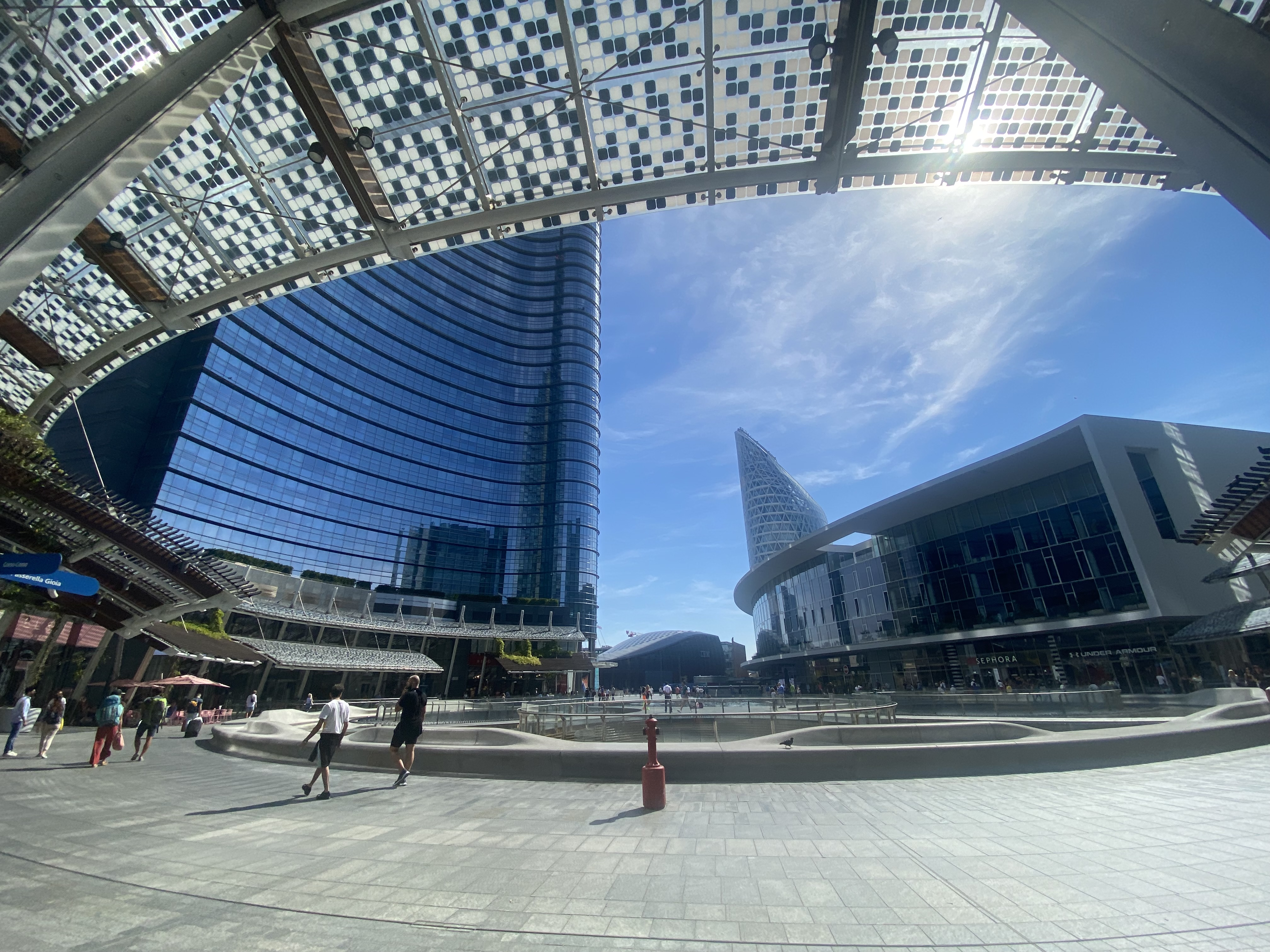
The Piazza in 2023

It is raised 6 meters above the level of Via Vincenzo Capelli, the access from the south, and about 15 meters above Viale Luigi Sturzo, the access from the west. It was designed by the Argentine architect, César Pelli to complement the skyscrapers immediately next door, currently owned by the Immobiliare Porta Nuova Garibaldi fund and leased to several multinationals, the main one being the bank UniCredit.

It was inaugurated on December 8, 2012, resulting in its naming after the well-known Italian designer and architect Gae Aulenti, who had died just under two months earlier.

As from the nearby Alvar Aalto square, the skyline of Milan can be viewed from the piazza. From the piazza you can see; the Garibaldi Towers and the adjacent skyscrapers of the Bosco Verticale residential complex, the Palazzo Lombardia (home of the Lombardy Regional Council), the Torre Galfa, the Torre Servizi Tecnici Comunali, the Grattacielo Pirelli, the residential towers Torre Solari, Torre Solea and Torre Aria and a portion of the Torre Diamante. In addition to this, from the level of the square it is possible to have an imposing overview of the UniCredit Tower, the headquarters of the bank of the same name, which at 231 meters is the tallest skyscraper in Italy.

A symbol of contemporary Milan, Piazza Gae Aulenti is the setting for several commercials and photo shoots, as well as musical and social events, thanks in part to the presence of the IBM Studios, a multipurpose space made of wood and concrete on the border between the square and the Park Library.

== Social and commercial life ==
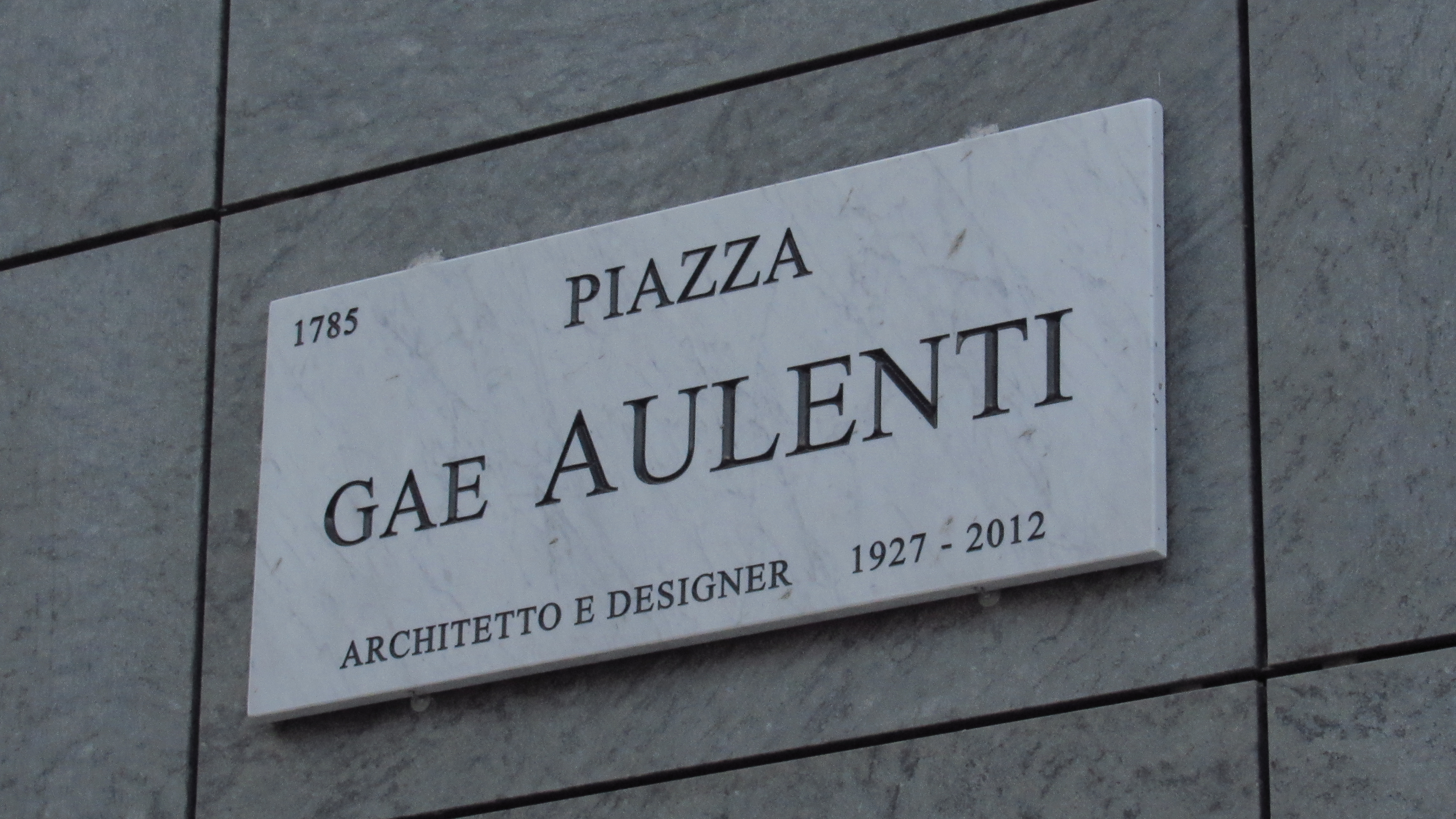
Piazza Gae Aulenti street sign

The predominantly working vocation of the square, given by the presence of the UniCredit offices in one of the towers above it and the AXA offices on the opposite side of the adjacent street, has not prevented it from becoming a popular destination for various types of visitors, both citizens and tourists. Its proximity to Corso Como. Due to its location, it is in a strategic location for evening nightlife, while the presence of three large fountains equipped with water, light and music features is a popular attraction. It is not uncommon in the summertime for several people to play and cool off in the water mirrors.

Very often, the square is set up with stands and decorations during festivities, such as during the Christmas holidays, and special events, such as the Fashion Week.

On the first weekend of March 2014, the piazza hosted the inauguration events of the Isola metro station.

On the commercial site, there are, among others, an ice cream store Grom, a clothing and furniture store Muji, some stores owned by brands such as Nike, Dyson and Moleskine, a dealership of the electric car manufacturer Tesla, a store of the perfume and cosmetics chain Sephora and a restaurant-library RED Feltrinelli. On the lower floor is an Esselunga.

== Gallery ==
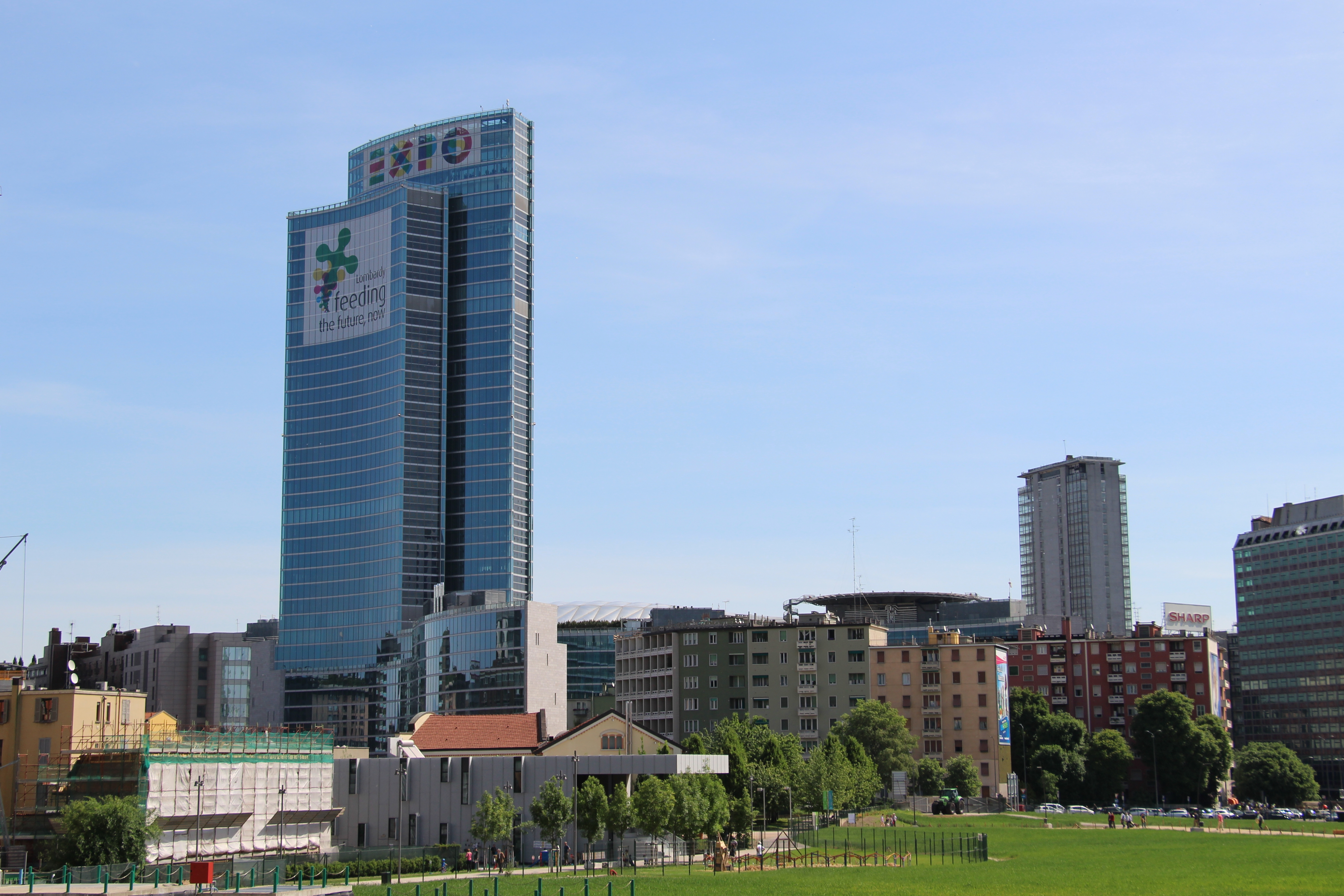
Palazzo Lombardia and Piazza Gae Aulenti

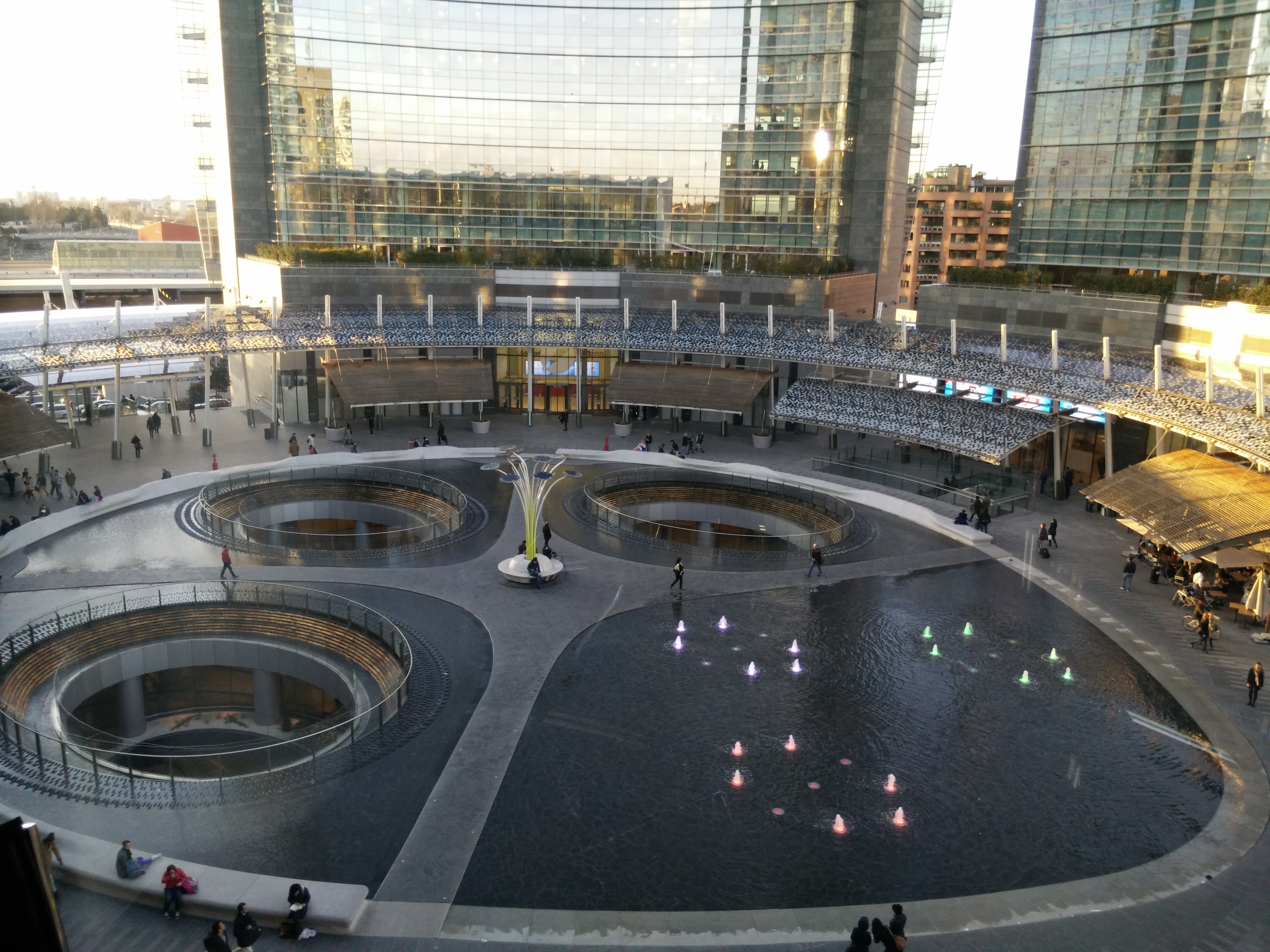
Piazza Gae Aulenti viewed from the UniCredit tower

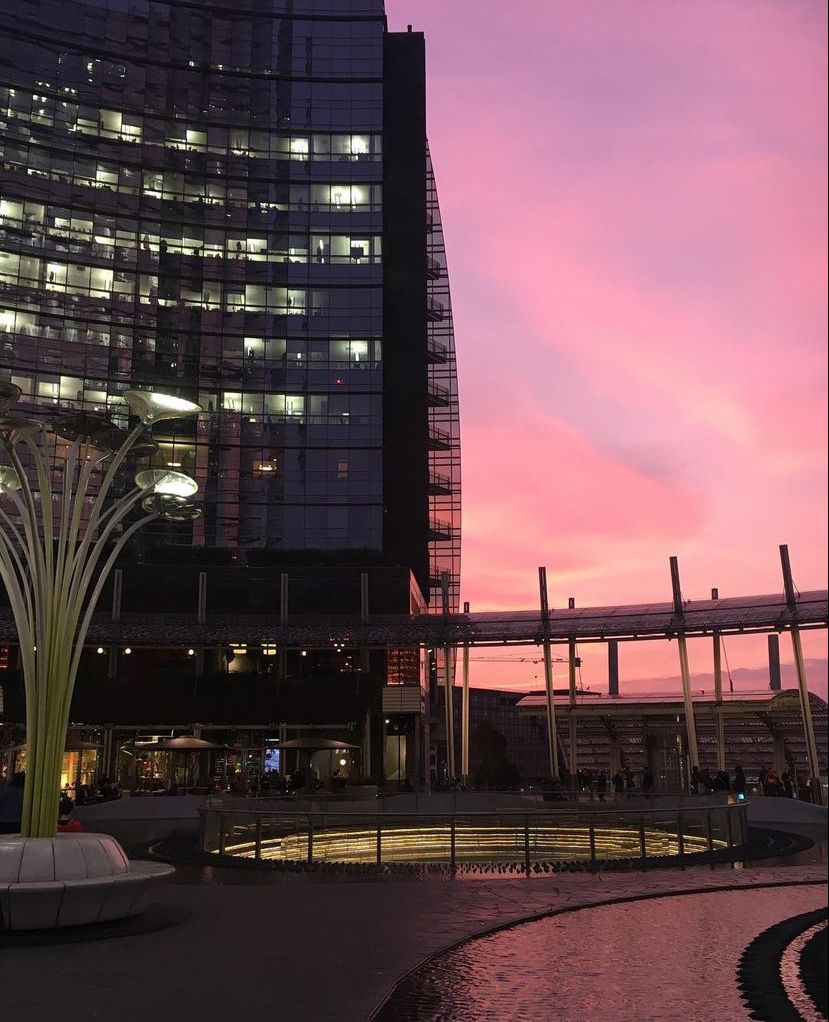
The piazza at sunset

Piazza Gae Aulenti and the UniCredit tower

IBM Studios with UniCredit tower in the background
