= Brandywine Realty Trust =

American real estate investment firm

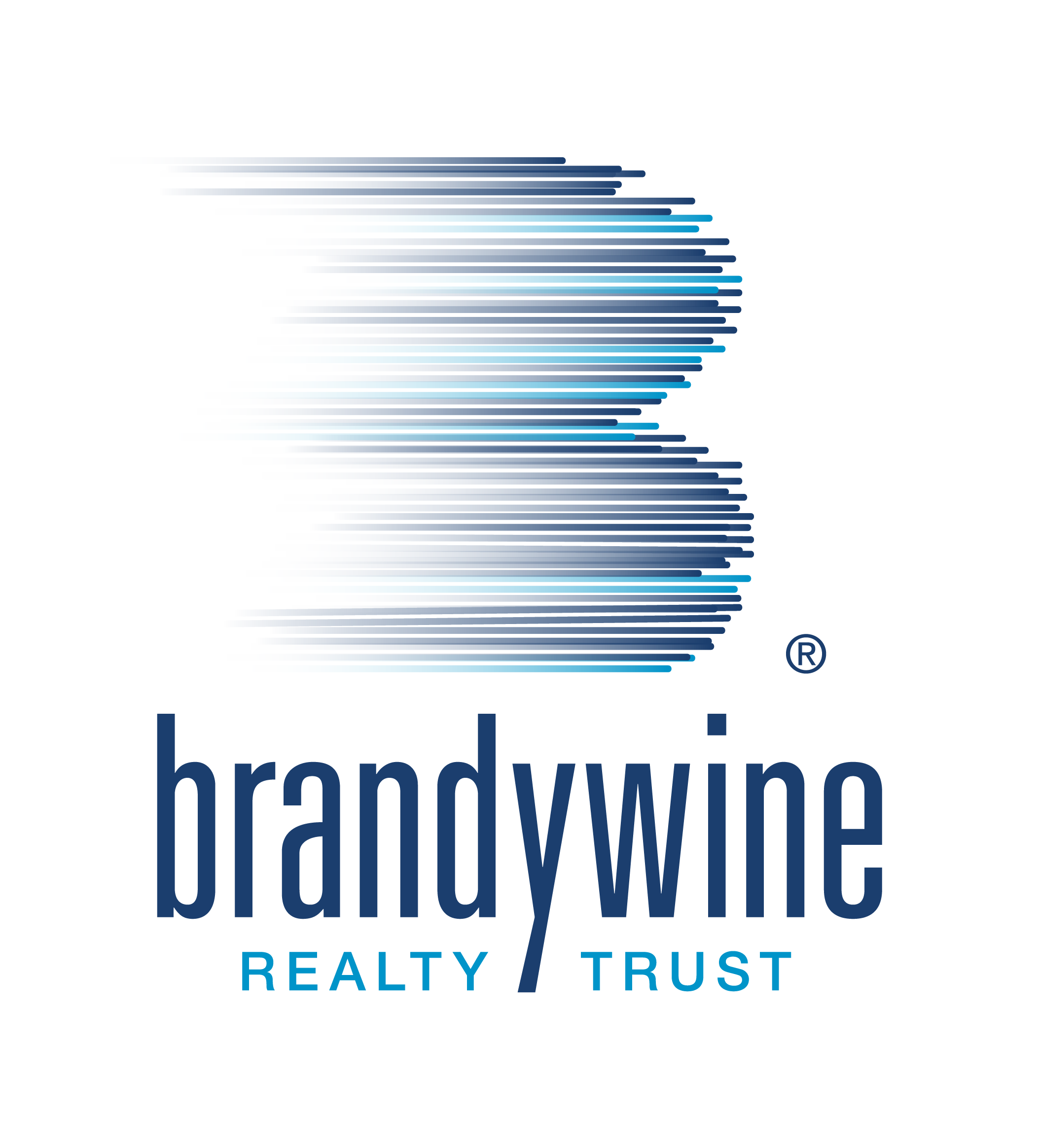
- Company type: Public
- Traded as: NYSE: BDN
- Industry: Real estate investment trust
- Founded: 1994; 32 years ago
- Headquarters: 2929 Arch St., Suite 1800, Philadelphia, Pennsylvania, U.S.
- Key people: Gerard H. Sweeney, CEO & President; Michael J. Joyce, Chairman; Thomas E. Wirth, CFO
- Products: Office buildings
- Revenue: ▲US$506 million (2022)
- Net income: ▲US$53 million (2022)
- Total assets: ▲US$3.874 billion (2022)
- Total equity: ▼US$1.633 billion (2022)
- Number of employees: 334 (2022)
- Website: brandywinerealty.com

Brandywine Realty Trust is a Philadelphia-based real estate investment trust (REIT) that invests in office buildings in Philadelphia, Washington, D.C., and Austin, Texas.

As of December 31, 2022, the company owned interests in 72 properties containing 12.8 million net rentable square feet.

== History ==
The company was founded in 1994 by Jerry Sweeney.

In 1998, the company acquired a portfolio of 23 properties for $229 million, an office park for $48.5 million, and a property portfolio of 68 smaller properties.

In 2001, the company completed an asset exchange with Prentiss Properties Trust.

In May 2005, the company completed the development of the Cira Centre, designed by César Pelli, next to Philadelphia's 30th Street Station.

In January 2006, the company acquired Prentiss Properties Trust for $3.3 billion.

In 2010, the company completed the renovation of Cira Square, a former U.S. post office building that was leased to the General Services Administration for occupancy by the Internal Revenue Service.

In 2013, the company acquired Commerce Square for $331.8 million.

In 2016, the company sold a portfolio of 58 office properties for $398.1 million.
