= United States Post Office-Main Branch (Philadelphia) =

- U.S. National Register of Historic Places
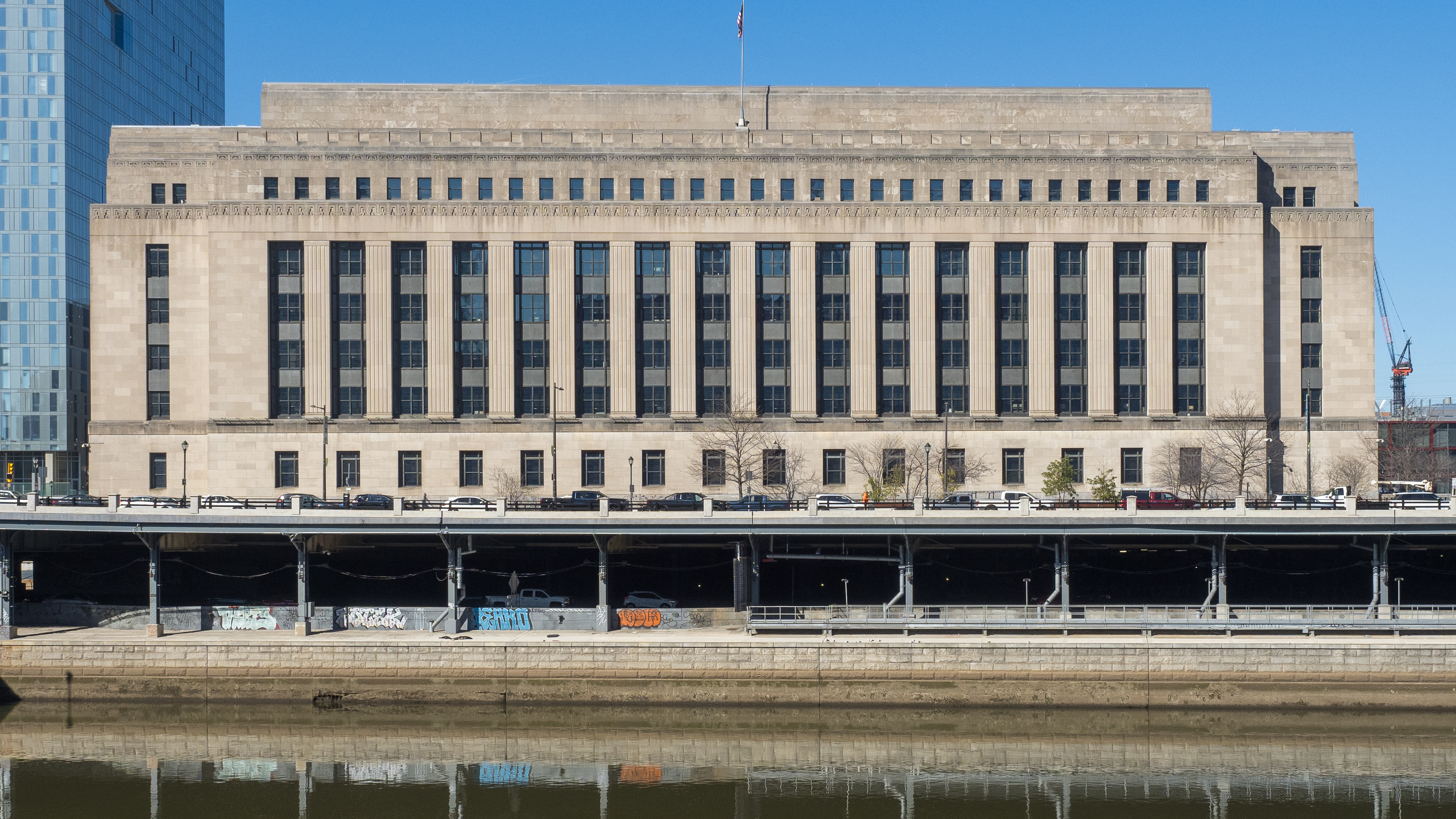
- (2024)

- Location within Philadelphia Location within Pennsylvania Location within the United States
- Location: 2970 Market St., Philadelphia, Pennsylvania, U.S.
- Coordinates: 39°57′21″N 75°10′58″W
- Area: 5 acres (2.0 ha)
- Built: 1933
- Architect: Rankin & Kellogg; et al.
- Architectural style: Art Deco
- NRHP reference No.: 06000782
- Added to NRHP: September 5, 2006

The former United States Post Office-Main Branch is a historic post office building that is located in the University City neighborhood of Philadelphia. It is situated across from Amtrak's 30th Street Station. It operated as the main postal processing facility for Philadelphia from 1933 until its closure in 2008. It was added to the National Register of Historic Places in 2006.

== History ==
=== 20th century ===
Built between 1931 and 1935, this historic structure is a six-story, steel frame building that was clad in limestone and designed in the Art Deco-style. It measures 386 feet (118 m) wide and 455 feet (139 m) long.

The world's first scheduled rotorcraft airmail service served the Post Office. The building had been designed with a flat roof with underfloor heating to prevent snow and ice. It also had take-off ramps, radio and weather reporting equipment, and fuelling and maintenance facilities. The operation, flown by Kellett KD-1B autogyros of Eastern Air Lines, started on July 6, 1939.

The contract for the route, AM2001, involved five flights per day, six days a week, between the Post Office and Camden Central Airport, 6 miles (9.7 km) away in Camden, New Jersey. The main pilot was Johnny Miller. The contract ended a year later, with 2,634 flights completed, representing 85% of all scheduled flights – a very impressive statistic for the time; however, the contract was not renewed.

=== 21st century ===
The facility closed on September 29, 2008. when main distribution center activities moved to a new facility adjacent to the Philadelphia International Airport. A new retail location was opened nearby at 3000 Chestnut Street. Ownership of the original complex was transferred to the University of Pennsylvania.

The building has been converted into office space, including the regional headquarters of the Internal Revenue Service. The site immediately south, across Chestnut St, was developed into a complex including an apartment tower, a parking garage, the Cira Green rooftop park, and the FMC Tower. The final part of land, south of Walnut St, became Penn Park.

It was added to the National Register of Historic Places in 2005.
