= Commerce Square =

High-rise office building complex in Philadelphia, Pennsylvania

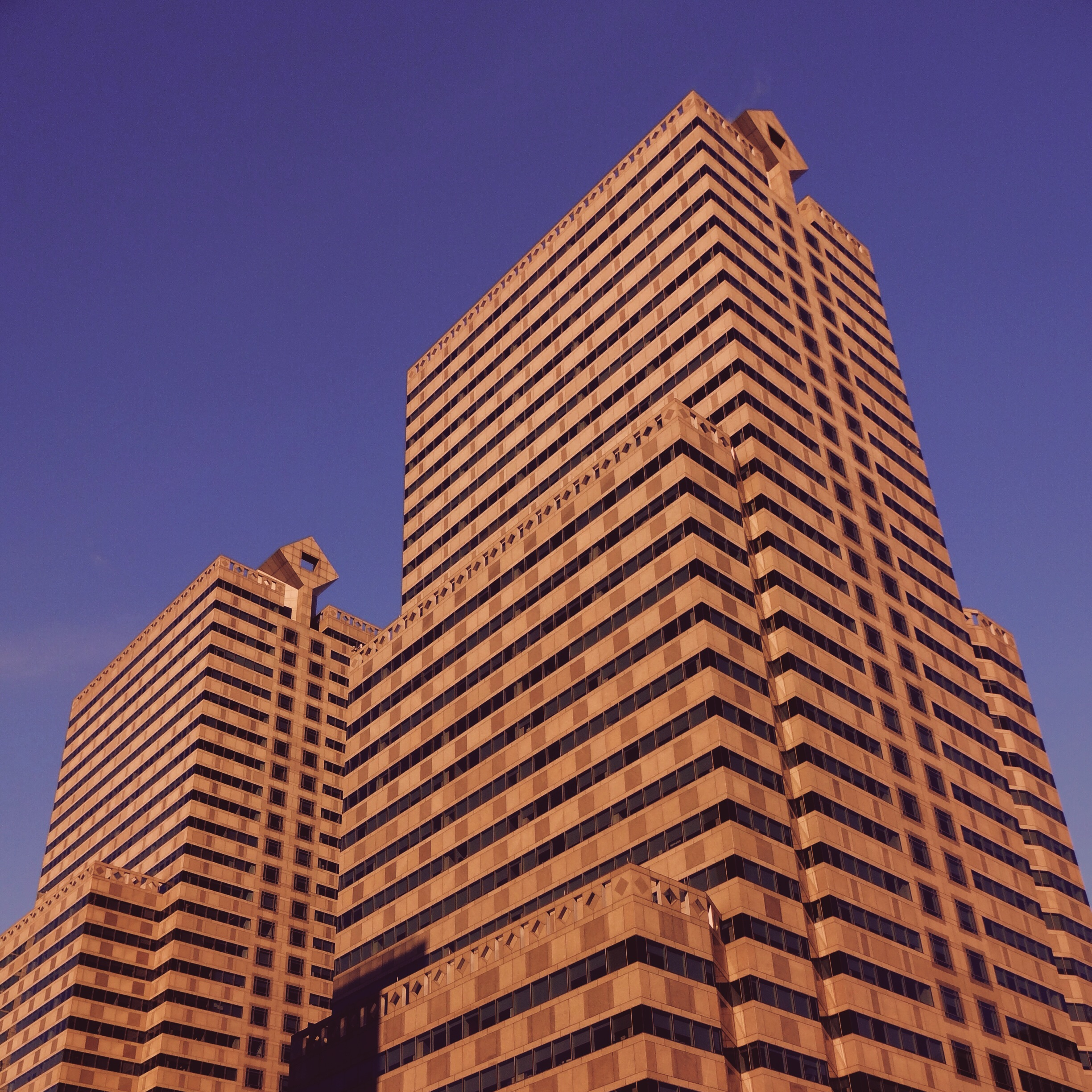
- Commerce Square in February 2014

- Location within Philadelphia

General information
- Status: Completed
- Type: Office
- Location: 2001-2005 W. Market Street, Philadelphia, Pennsylvania, U.S.
- Coordinates: 39.9541°N 75.1741°W
- Construction started: 1985 / 1990
- Completed: Renovated in 2013
- Opening: 1987 / 1992
- Cost: $ 331.8 million
- Owner: Brandywine Realty Trust (NYSE : BDN)
- Operator: Brandywine Realty Trust (NYSE : BDN)

Height
- Roof: 565 feet (172 m)

Technical details
- Floor count: 41
- Floor area: 2,200,000 square feet (200,000 m^{2})

Design and construction
- Architect: IM Pei & Partners
- Developer: Maguire Thomas Partners; IBM
- Engineer: CBM Engineers Inc.
- Main contractor: Turner Construction

Commerce Square is a Class-A, high-rise office building complex in Center City Philadelphia. Commerce Square consists of One and Two Commerce Square, two identical 41-story office towers 565 feet (172 m) high that surround a paved courtyard of 30,000 square feet (2,800 m^{2}).

Architecturally, the granite-clad towers feature setbacks on the north and south sides of the building and are topped with a pair of stone diamonds with cutout squares in the center. The towers were built as part an office-building boom Philadelphia was experiencing on West Market Street in the late 1980s. Designed by IM Pei & Partners (now called Pei Cobb Freed & Partners), the towers were developed in a joint venture between Maguire Thomas Partners and IBM.

IBM leased more than half of One Commerce Square for the company's Mid-Atlantic headquarters. Construction of the first phase, which included One Commerce Square, the plaza, and retail space, began in 1985 and was completed in 1987. The project's second phase, Two Commerce Square, did not begin until a lead tenant was secured for the building in 1990. Consolidated Rail Corporation (Conrail) agreed to be Two Commerce Square's lead tenant and make the skyscraper its corporate headquarters after a two-year search for office space in the region. Two Commerce Square ended the skyscraper construction boom of the 1980s when it was completed in 1992. No other office skyscraper was built in Philadelphia until Brandywine Realty Trust (NYSE: BDN) built the Cira Centre in 2005.

In the 1990s, Commerce Square's lead tenants reduced their presence dramatically in the towers. IBM moved some of its operations out of Philadelphia in the early 1990s, and Conrail was bought by Norfolk Southern Railway and CSX Transportation later in the decade. Almost all of Conrail's operations were moved out of Philadelphia by the 2000s. Commerce Square was praised mainly for its design of two towers surrounding a plaza. Renowned Philadelphia urban planner Edmund N. Bacon praised Commerce Square and its plaza by saying it "will prove to be one of the finest commercial projects to be built in this century".

== History ==
Commerce Square was part of an office-building boom that took place in the late 1980s in Philadelphia, Pennsylvania. During the boom numerous skyscrapers were constructed in the West Market Street neighborhood of Center City. The US$300 million development of Commerce Square was led by Robert F. Maguire III, co-managing partner of Maguire Thomas Partners of Los Angeles. To get his project moving, Maguire engaged the architectural firm IM Pei & Partners (now called Pei Cobb Freed & Partners) to design the complex. Using a design by a leading architectural firm as incentive, Maguire approached IBM, a company he had past associations with.

By early November 1984, after negotiations with Maguire, IBM agreed to be a joint partner in the development. IBM also agreed to serve as the lead tenant for One Commerce Square, occupying about half the building as its headquarters for the Mid-Atlantic region. Commerce Square would be split between two buildings, One Commerce Square being built first, and the second tower, Two Commerce Square, being built later once a lead tenant was secured. Plans for Commerce Square were officially announced on November 16, 1984 at a press conference held by Maguire and IBM at the Bellevue-Stratford Hotel. The first phase of the project included One Commerce Square, retail and restaurant space, a plaza, and an underground parking garage. Construction began with the first phase on June 10, 1985. One Commerce Square was topped off with a ceremony on June 6, 1986, and the skyscraper officially opened on October 23, 1987.

In 1987 the Consolidated Rail Corporation (Conrail) indicated it wanted to consolidate its offices spread out across Philadelphia into one office building. In May 1988, Conrail solicited proposals from developers for a building to house its corporate headquarters. On March 30, 1990, after being sought after by numerous developers in Philadelphia and its suburbs, Conrail announced that it would be leasing 27 floors of Two Commerce Square. With a lead tenant secured, construction of the identical tower commenced in July 1990. Two Commerce Square was completed in July 1992 and Conrail began moving in approximately 3,000 employees in September of that year. Two Commerce Square marked the end of the skyscraper boom of the 1980s, being the last office skyscraper to be built in Philadelphia until the Cira Centre in 2005.

After the office-building boom of the 1980s, the 1990s saw an office glut that resulted in numerous vacancies and reduced leasing rates throughout Center City. In 1993 IBM, struggling financially, was shrinking its workforce and consolidating its operations nationwide, and its plans included moving some of its local employees out of the city. Though IBM had initially occupied nearly half of One Commerce Square, by 1993 it was using only one-fifth of the building. In 1996, Maguire Thomas Partners split up, leaving the ownership of Commerce Square to Thomas Properties Group Inc. alone. After the split, Thomas Properties renegotiated mortgage financing of the Commerce Square towers. Thomas Properties Group successfully renegotiated the debt for Two Commerce Square with Bank of America, but was unable to renegotiate the debt with One Commerce Square's prime mortgage holder, Mitsubishi Trust and Banking Corporation. To break the deadlock, Philadelphia Plaza Associates filed for Chapter 11 bankruptcy protection. Thomas Properties Group was then the parent company of Philadelphia Plaza Associates which owned Commerce Square.

Philadelphia Plaza Associates emerged from bankruptcy reorganization early in 1998, but the company still had concerns about filling the space soon to be vacated by Conrail. In October 1996 Conrail was bought by Norfolk Southern Railway and CSX Transportation. The merger was concluded in May 1998 and the former Conrail offices and employees began to be moved out of the building. In the merger deal, CSX Transportation absorbed Conrail's 15-year lease. CSX was responsible for paying the lease, but the 728,000 square feet (68,000 m^{2}) of space was subleased, offsetting the cost. Between 1999 and 2000, as Conrail offices were phased out of Two Commerce Square, Thomas Properties filled the newly vacated space with new tenants.

== Architecture ==
Located on West Market Street in Center City Philadelphia, Commerce Square comprises twin 41-story (Note: The towers are described as having 41 floors by Thomas Properties and most other sources. Only the Pei Cobb Freed & Partners website say the towers have 40 floors.) 565 feet (172 m) office towers designed by Henry N. Cobb and Douglas Gardner of IM Pei & Partners. Commerce Square covers an entire block, between 20th and 21st Streets and Market Street and John F. Kennedy Boulevard. Commerce Square contains 2,200,000 square feet (200,000 m^{2}), which includes 1,850,000 square feet (170,000 m^{2}) of office space, 92,000 square feet (8,500 m^{2}) lobby, and a 175,000 square feet (16,000 m^{2}), 625 car parking garage. The pale-gray granite-clad skyscrapers feature setbacks on the north and south sides of the building, with the bottom floors containing 33,000 square feet (3,100 m^{2}) and the upper floors 15,000 square feet (1,400 m^{2}). The floors feature a large amount of floor space, a design influenced by IBM's needs in the 1980s. The two towers are topped with a pair of standing stone diamonds with cutout squares in the center.

The towers are separated by a 30,000 square feet (2,800 m^{2}) paved courtyard. Tables and chairs are arranged around a large pink granite circular fountain in the plaza's center. The plaza was designed by Laurie Olin of Hanna/Olin Ltd. Impressed by Commerce Square's plaza, Philadelphia's city planning commission included influences from the complex in a new building code governing open space.

=== Reception ===
Commerce Square was praised for its design of two towers surrounding a plaza. The Philadelphia Inquirer said "Its most positive aspect is that it avoids the developers' cliches of atriums and shopping malls and makes a real urban place. It expresses great confidence in Philadelphia, and even more important, in the whole idea of living in cities." Renowned Philadelphia urban planner Edmund N. Bacon praised Commerce Square and its plaza by saying "[Olin's] sensitivity for urban design is beautifully demonstrated by his design for the lobby level, including the splendid garden, of Commerce Square at 20th and Market streets, which I think will prove to be one of the finest commercial projects to be built in this century."

== Tenants ==
One Commerce Square's main tenant is IBM, which moved into the skyscraper when it opened in 1987. IBM initially occupied nearly half of One Commerce Square, but in the decades since, consolidation has reduced the company's presence in the building. Other tenants in One Commerce Square include Ernst & Young LLP, Stradley Ronon Stevens & Young LLP, The Pew Charitable Trusts, Fiserv Securities Inc., Thorp Reed & Armstrong LLP, and Delaware Investments, which also leases office space in Two Commerce Square.

When Two Commerce Square opened in 1992, the Consolidated Rail Corporation made 728,000 square feet (68,000 m^{2}) of the tower its corporate headquarters. Since being bought by Norfolk Southern and CSX Transportation, Conrail and CSX now share about 5,000 square feet (460 m^{2}) in the tower. Today Two Commerce Square has become a center of accounting and consulting firms, the largest of which is PricewaterhouseCoopers, which occupies 215,000 square feet (20,000 m^{2}). Occupying the tower since its 1992 opening, professional services firm Ernst & Young LLP leased 115,000 square feet (11,000 m^{2}) of the tower until relocating to One Commerce Square in early 2012. Other related firms include Delaware Investments which leases 125,000 square feet (12,000 m^{2}) and Grant Thornton LLP. Other tenants also fill the tower, these include Leaf Financial Corporation, which leases the 14th and 15th floors; Reliance Standard Life Insurance Co., which leases 130,000 square feet (12,000 m^{2}); and engineering firm McCormick Taylor, which occupies 60,000 square feet (5,600 m^{2}). In 2010, multimedia company Wolters Kluwer moved into 75,000 square feet (7,000 m^{2}) on the third and fourth floors, raising Two Commerce Square's occupancy to 91 percent.

== See also ==
- List of tallest buildings in Philadelphia
