= Commerce Place (Hamilton, Ontario) =

Commercial complex in Hamilton, Ontario, Canada

Commerce Place I
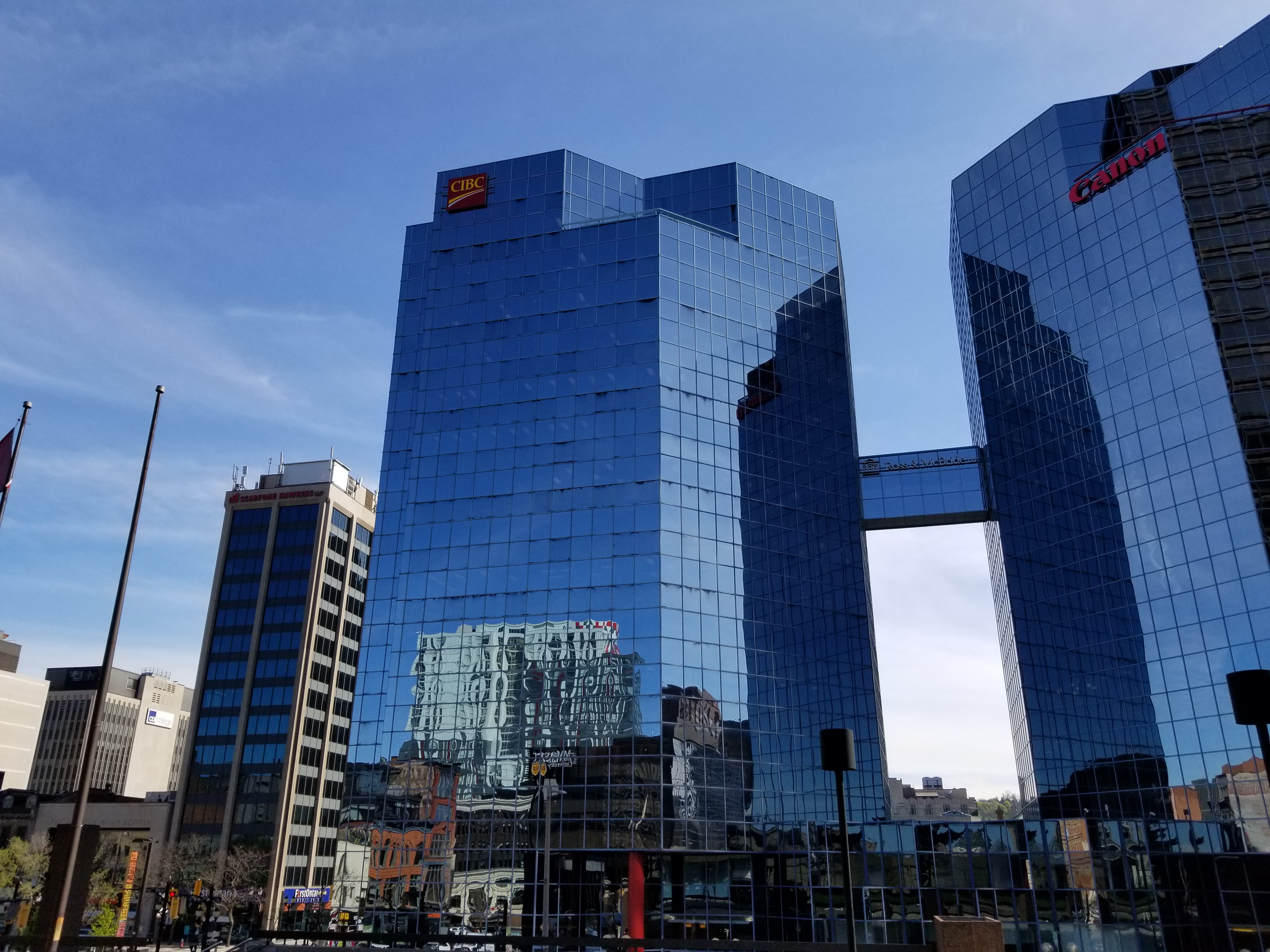
- Interactive map of the Commerce Place I area

General information
- Type: Office/ Commercial
- Location: Hamilton, Ontario, Canada
- Coordinates: 43°15′24.7″N 79°52′11.6″W
- Completed: 1987; 39 years ago

Height
- Roof: 81 m (266 ft)

Technical details
- Floor count: 16
- Lifts/elevators: 4

Design and construction
- Architects: Pellow & Associates

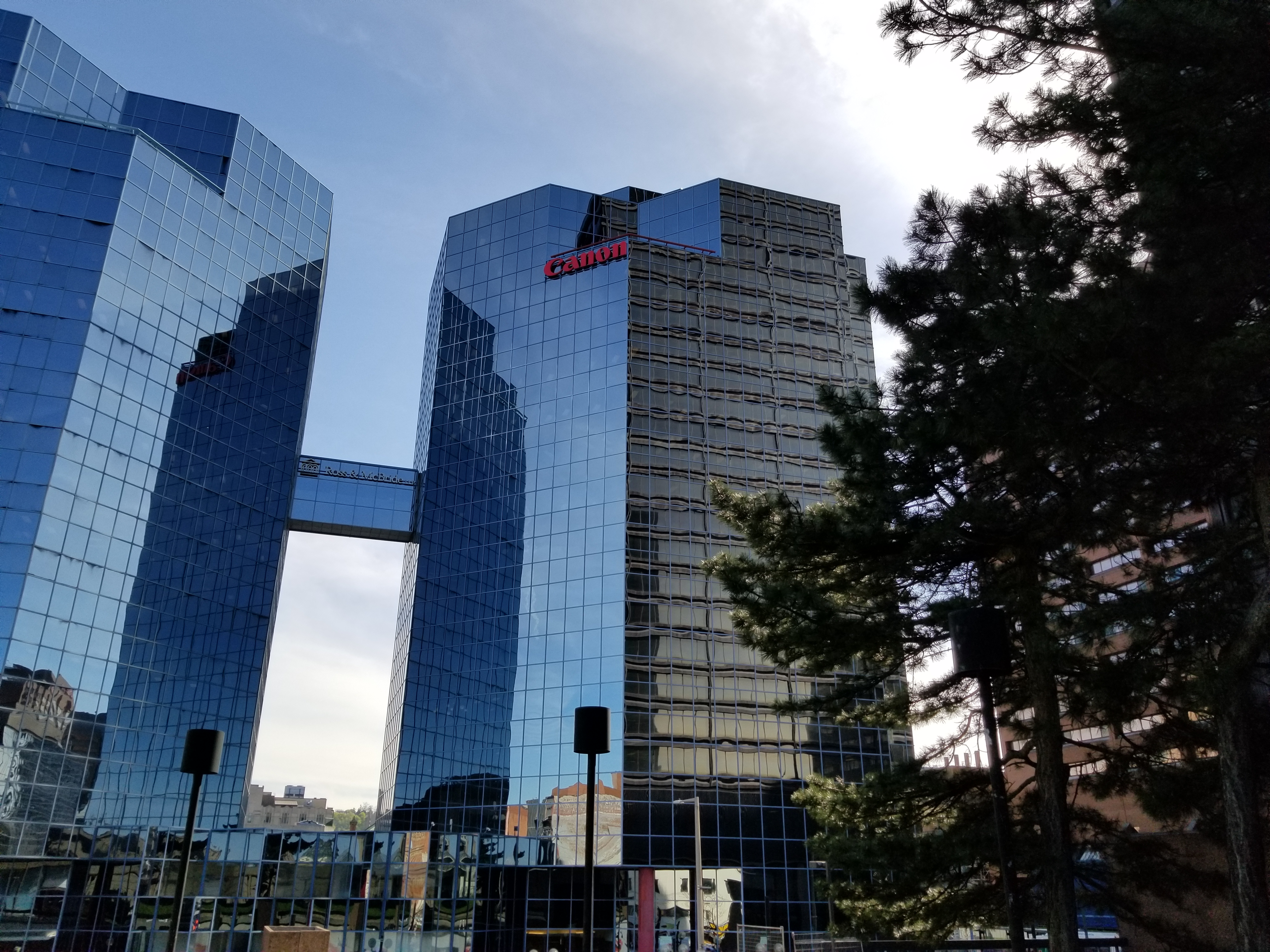
Commerce Place II

Commerce Place in a commercial complex, consisting of two towers, in Hamilton, Ontario, Canada.

== Commerce Place I ==
Commerce Place I was built in 1987 as the first of two towers in the complex. The second tower; Commerce Place II was built in 1990. The 16-storey twin towers stand at 81.0 meters. This makes Commerce Place the 9th tallest building complex in Hamilton. It is situated on the corners of King Street East and James Street North.

== Commerce Place II ==
Commerce Place II is the second tower in the complex, and was built in 1990. The 16-storey twin towers stand at 81.0 meters. This makes Commerce Place the 9th tallest building complex in Hamilton. It is situated on the corners of King Street East and MacNab Street South.

== Site history ==
The site where Commerce Place was built has a lot of history. It is the site where the Bank of Hamilton was established in 1872. in 1905 the Bank was doing so well it expanded its head office, adding on an additional 8 stories. This is significant because the bank headquarters became Hamilton's first skyscraper. Between 1898 and 1910, the Bank of Hamilton opened 128 branches in Ontario and western Canada; it did not, however, have representation east of Toronto. When the bank merged with The Canadian Bank of Commerce on January 2, 1924, it was one of the last surviving banks not headquartered in Toronto or Montreal.

The architect(s) for Commerce Place were Pellow & Associates and the property is managed by MVD Properties, Inc.

== Images ==
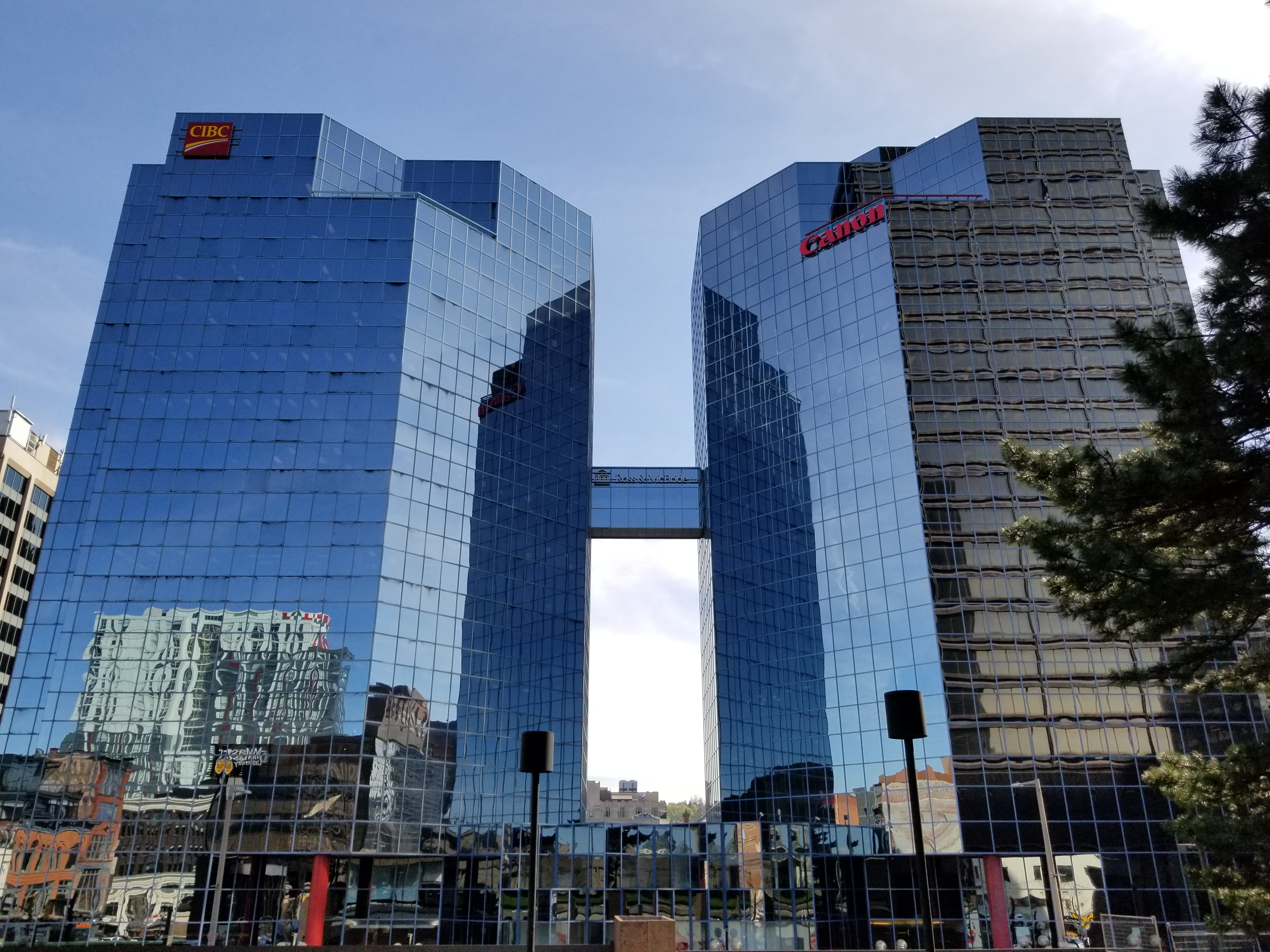
Commerce Place Complex

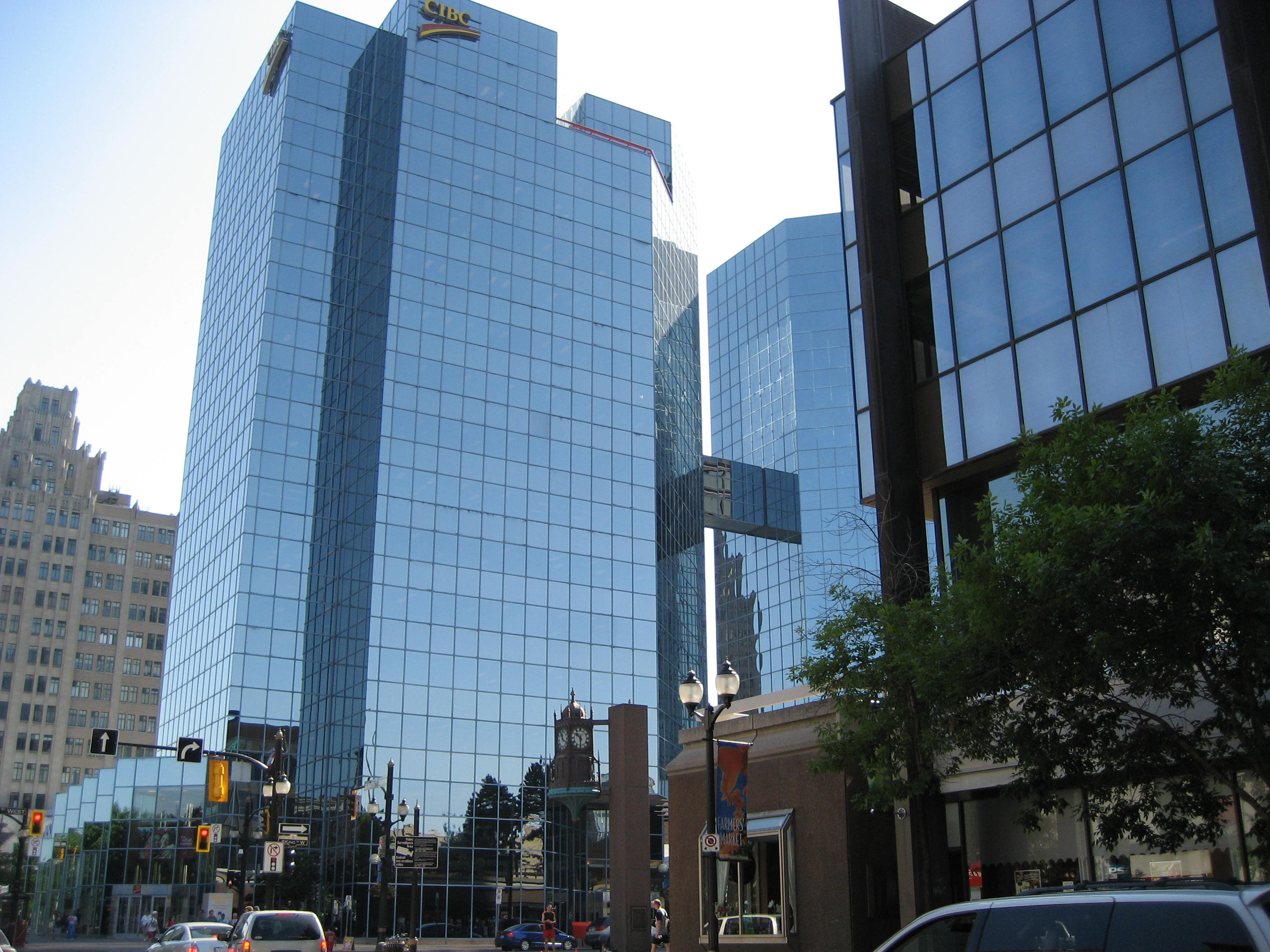
Commerce Place Complex

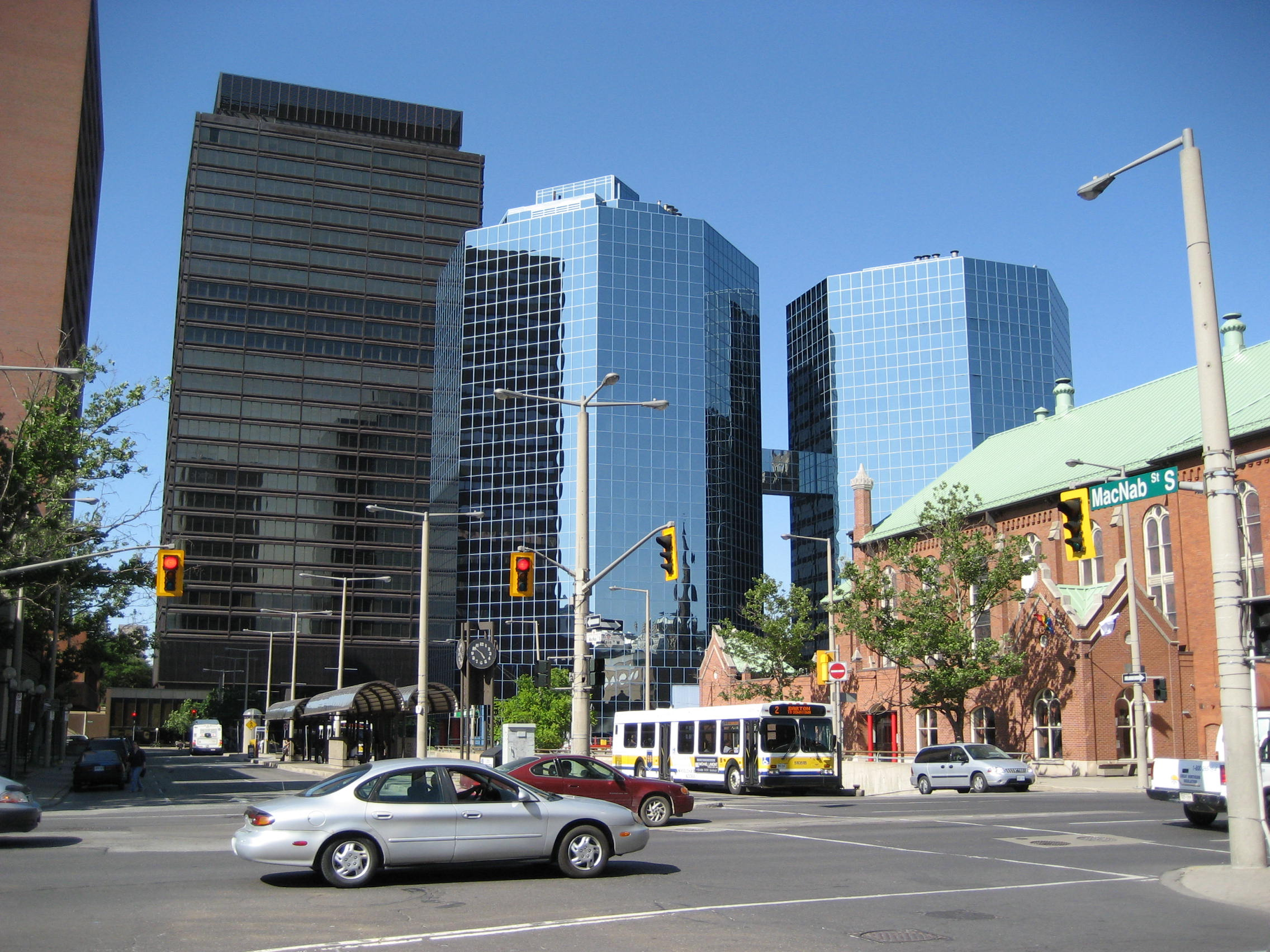
Commerce Place Complex

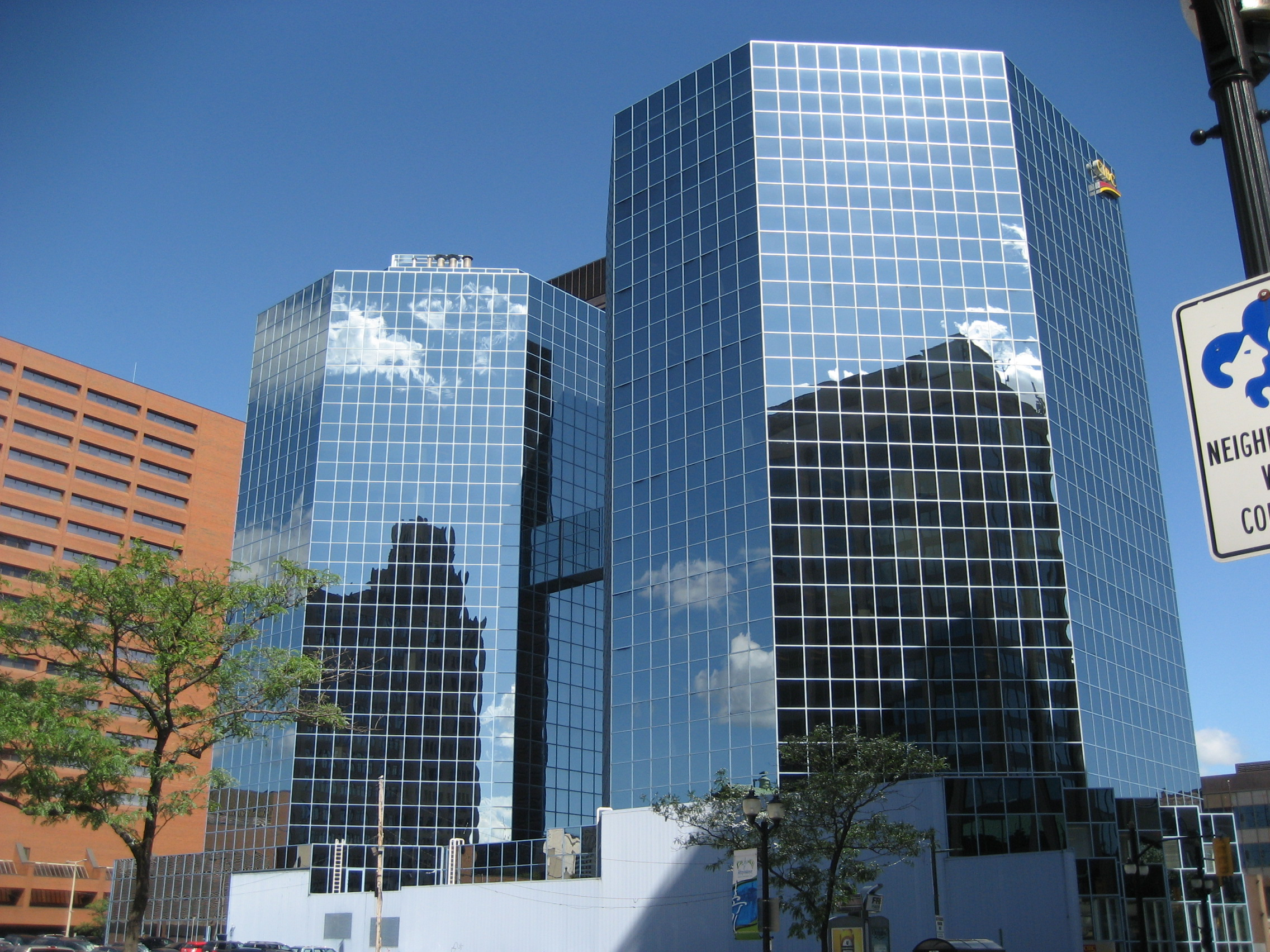
Commerce Place Complex

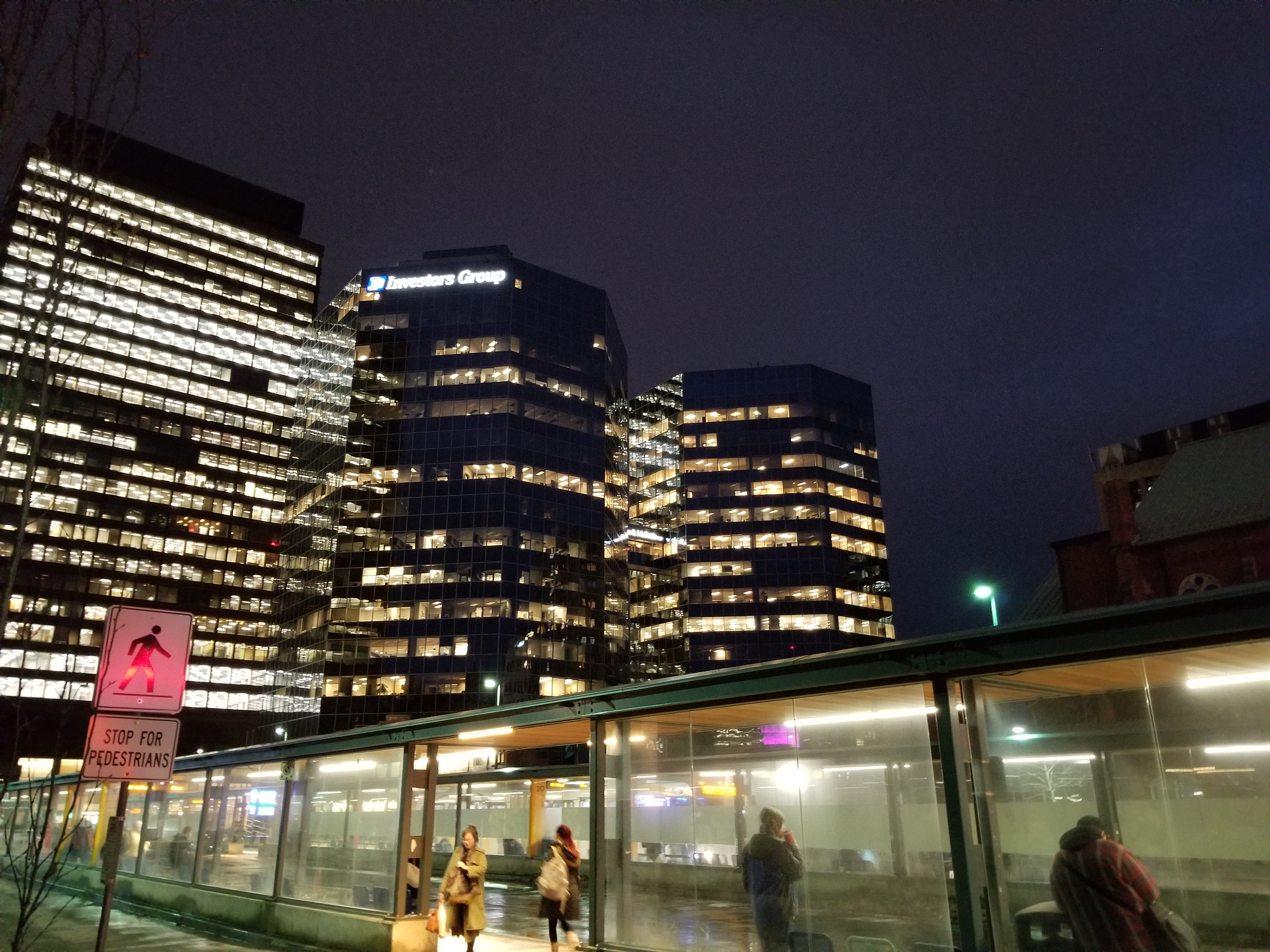
Commerce Place at dusk

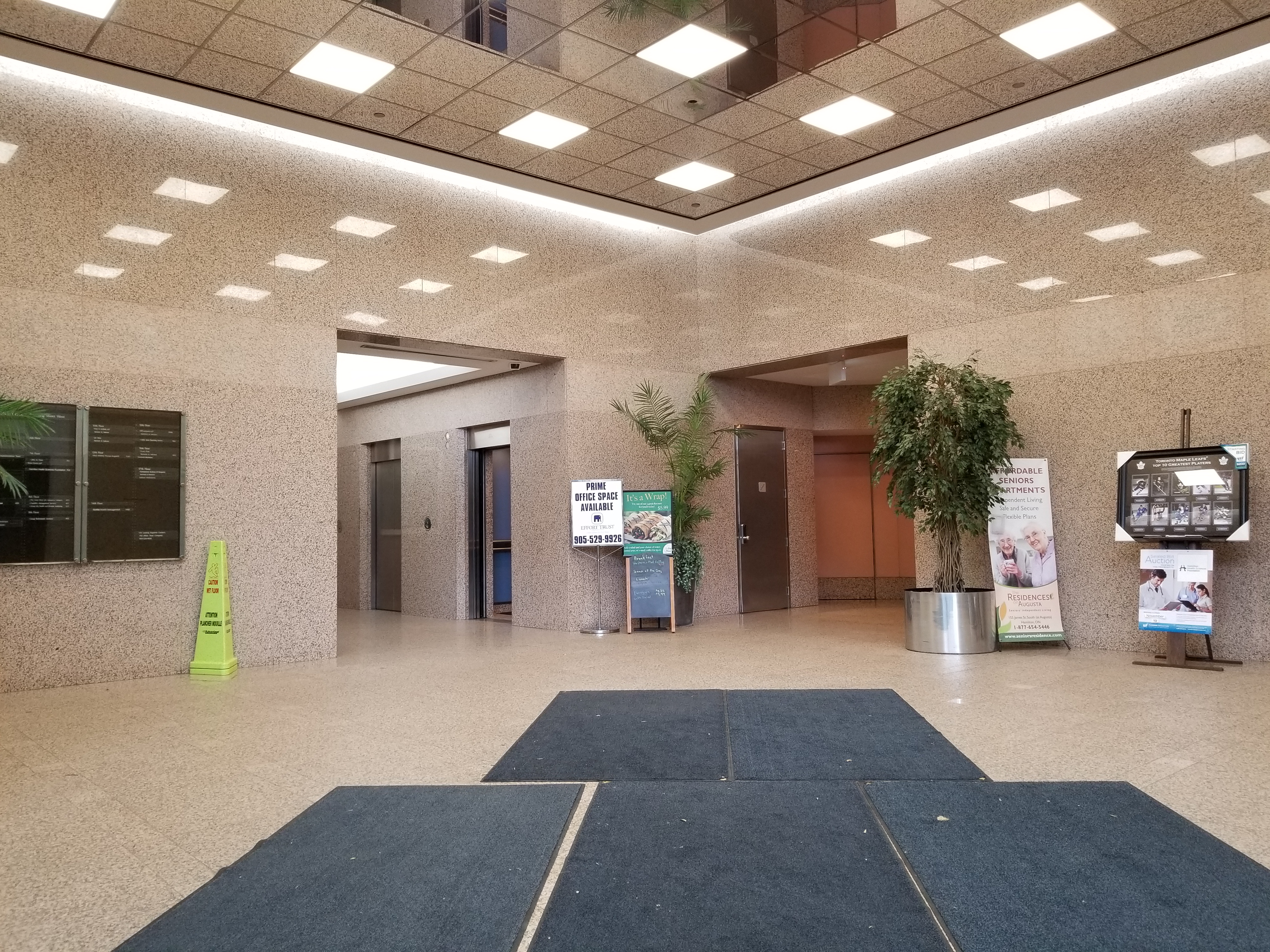
Commerce Place I Lobby

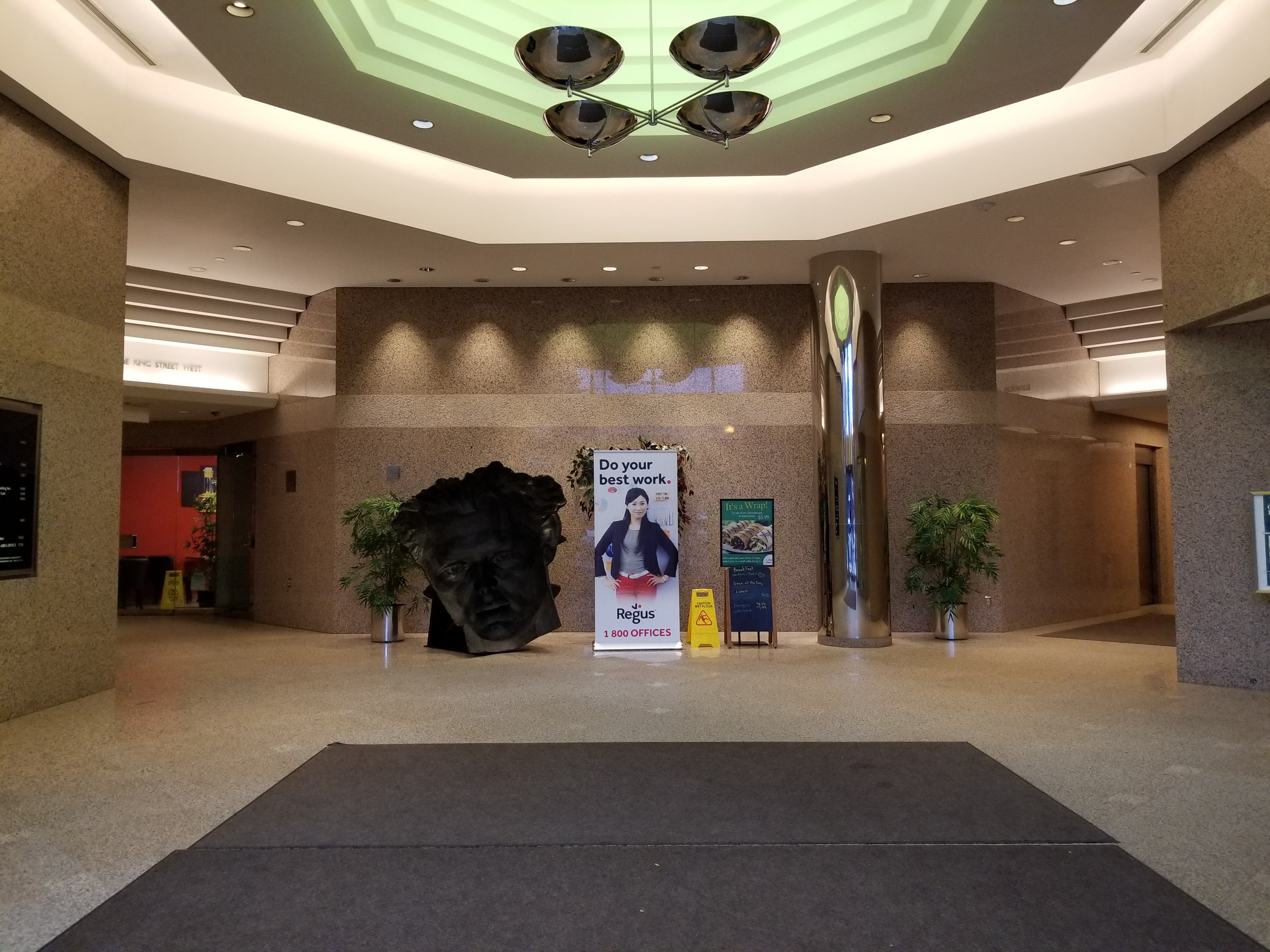
Commerce Place II Lobby

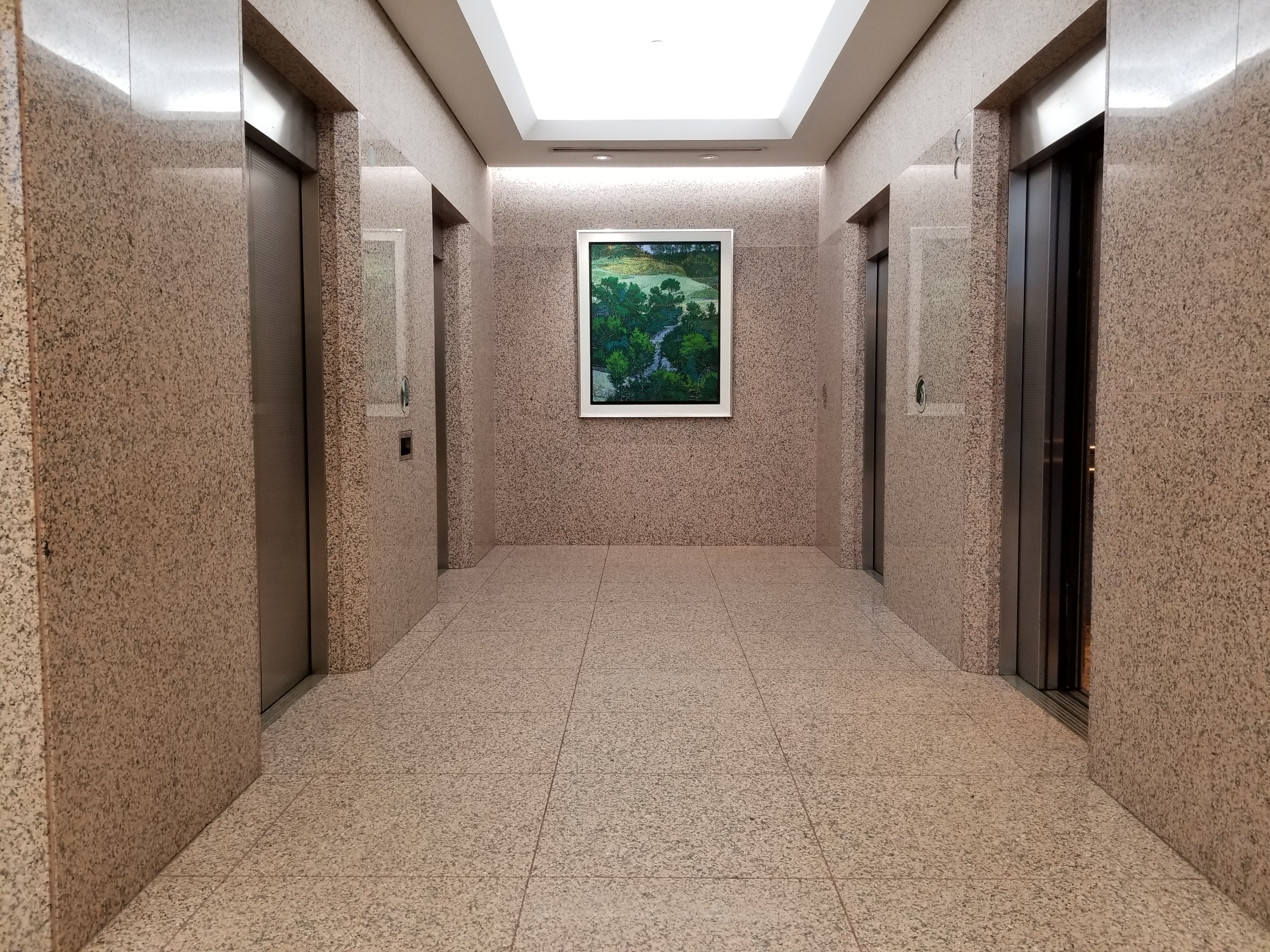
Commerce Place I Elevator Core

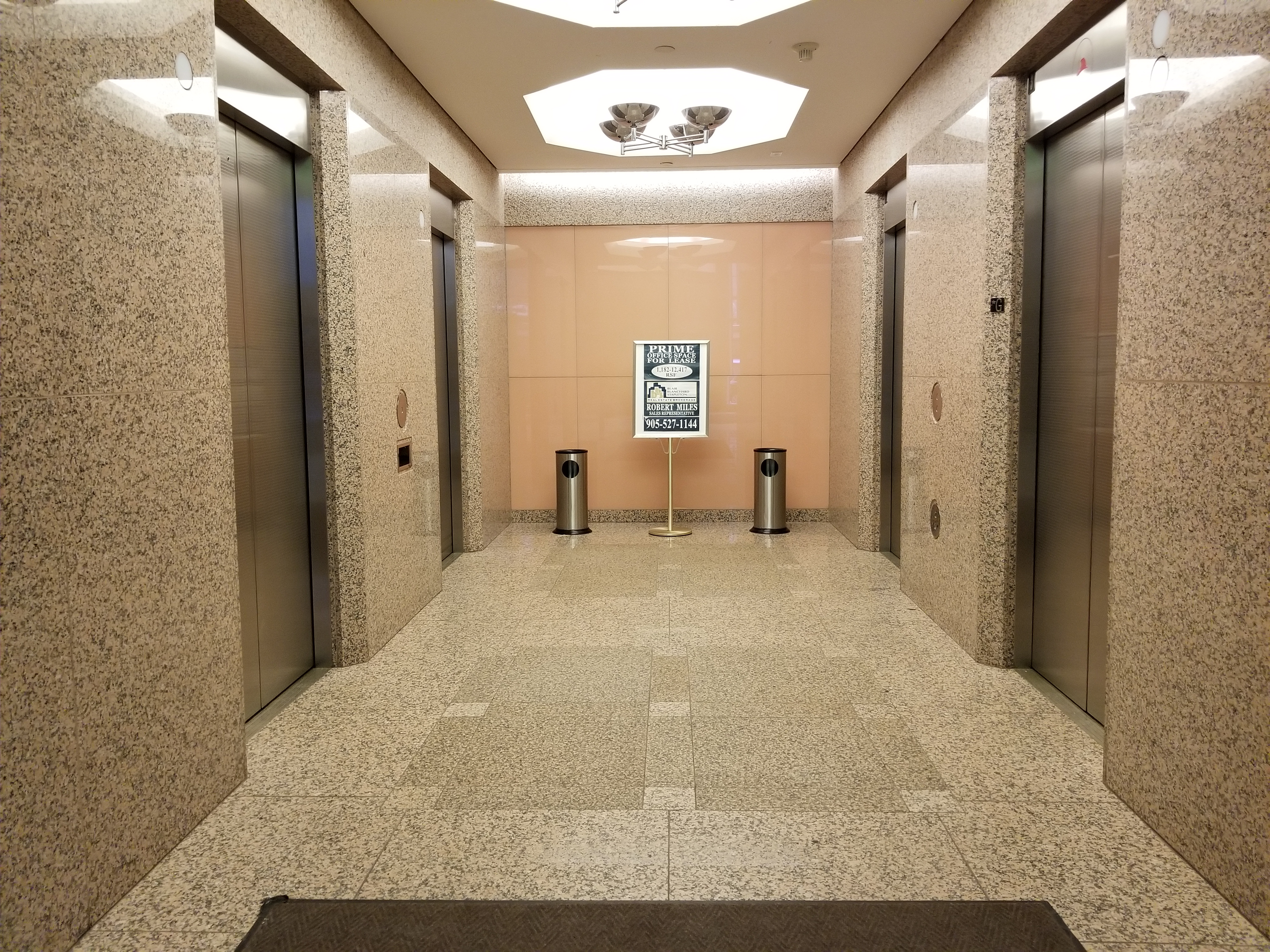
Commerce Place II Elevator Core

== See also ==
- List of tallest buildings in Hamilton, Ontario
- Commerce Court in Toronto
- Tour CIBC in Montreal
