= César Pelli =

Argentine-American architect (1926–2019)

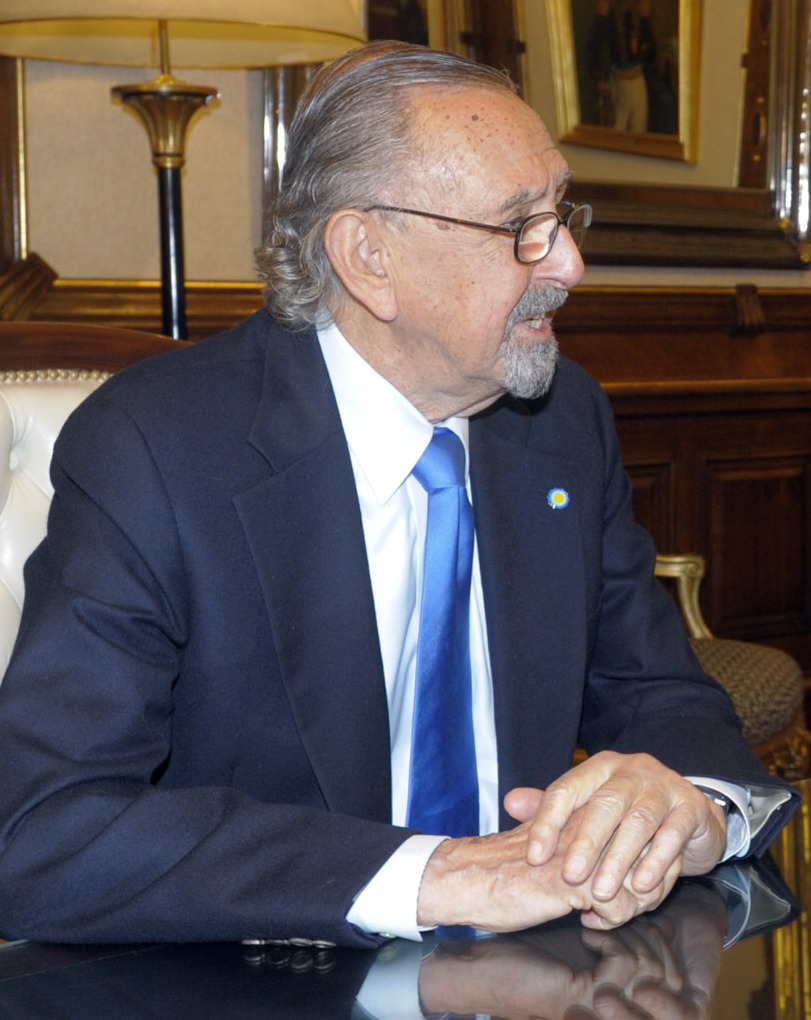
- César Pelli in June 2010
- Born: October 12, 1926; San Miguel de Tucumán, Argentina
- Died: July 19, 2019 (aged 92); New Haven, Connecticut, U.S.
- Citizenship: Argentina; United States (from 1964); France (from 1998)
- Education: National University of Tucumán; University of Illinois School of Architecture
- Occupation: Architect
- Awards: Doctor of Arts; CTBUH Skyscraper Award; Connecticut Architecture Foundation Distinguished Leadership Award; Lynn S. Beedle Lifetime Achievement Award; Aga Khan Award for Architecture
- Practice: Pelli Clarke Pelli Architects; Daniel, Mann, Johnson and Mendenhall
- Buildings: 777 Tower; Key Tower; Pacific Design Center; International Finance Centre (Hong Kong); Petronas Towers; World Financial Center, New York City; Bank of America Corporate Center; One Canada Square; Reagan National Airport (North Terminal); National Museum of Art, Osaka; Connecticut Science Center; Torre de Cristal; Gran Torre Santiago; Unicredit Tower; Salesforce Tower; Citylights
- Design: Modern architecture with material, formal, and contextual variety and no personal signature style

César Pelli (October 12, 1926 – July 19, 2019) was an Argentinian and American architect who designed some of the world's tallest buildings and other major urban landmarks. Three of his most notable buildings are the Petronas Towers in Kuala Lumpur, the World Financial Center in New York City, and the Salesforce Tower in San Francisco. The American Institute of Architects named him one of the ten most influential living American architects in 1991 and awarded him the AIA Gold Medal in 1995. In 2008, the Council on Tall Buildings and Urban Habitat presented him with The Lynn S. Beedle Lifetime Achievement Award.

== Life and education ==
Pelli was born October 12, 1926, in San Miguel de Tucumán, Argentina. His grandfather was an immigrant from Italy, while his mother's family was criollo. His father was a civil servant, who had been reduced to doing odd jobs due to the Depression, while his mother worked as a teacher. Pelli studied architecture at the Universidad Nacional de Tucumán. He graduated in 1949, after which he designed low-cost housing projects. In 1952, he attended the University of Illinois School of Architecture in the United States for advanced study in architecture, and received his Master of Science in Architecture degree in 1954.

He married landscape architect Diana Balmori. They had two children: Denis, a neurobiologist and Professor of Psychology and Neural Science at New York University, and Rafael Pelli, an architect. The couple resided in an apartment in The San Remo on Manhattan's Upper West Side.

Between 2001 and 2004, he led the design and early construction of the campus of Universidad Siglo 21 in Córdoba, Argentina, in collaboration with Diana Balmori and the local firm GGMPU.

== Career ==
=== Early years ===
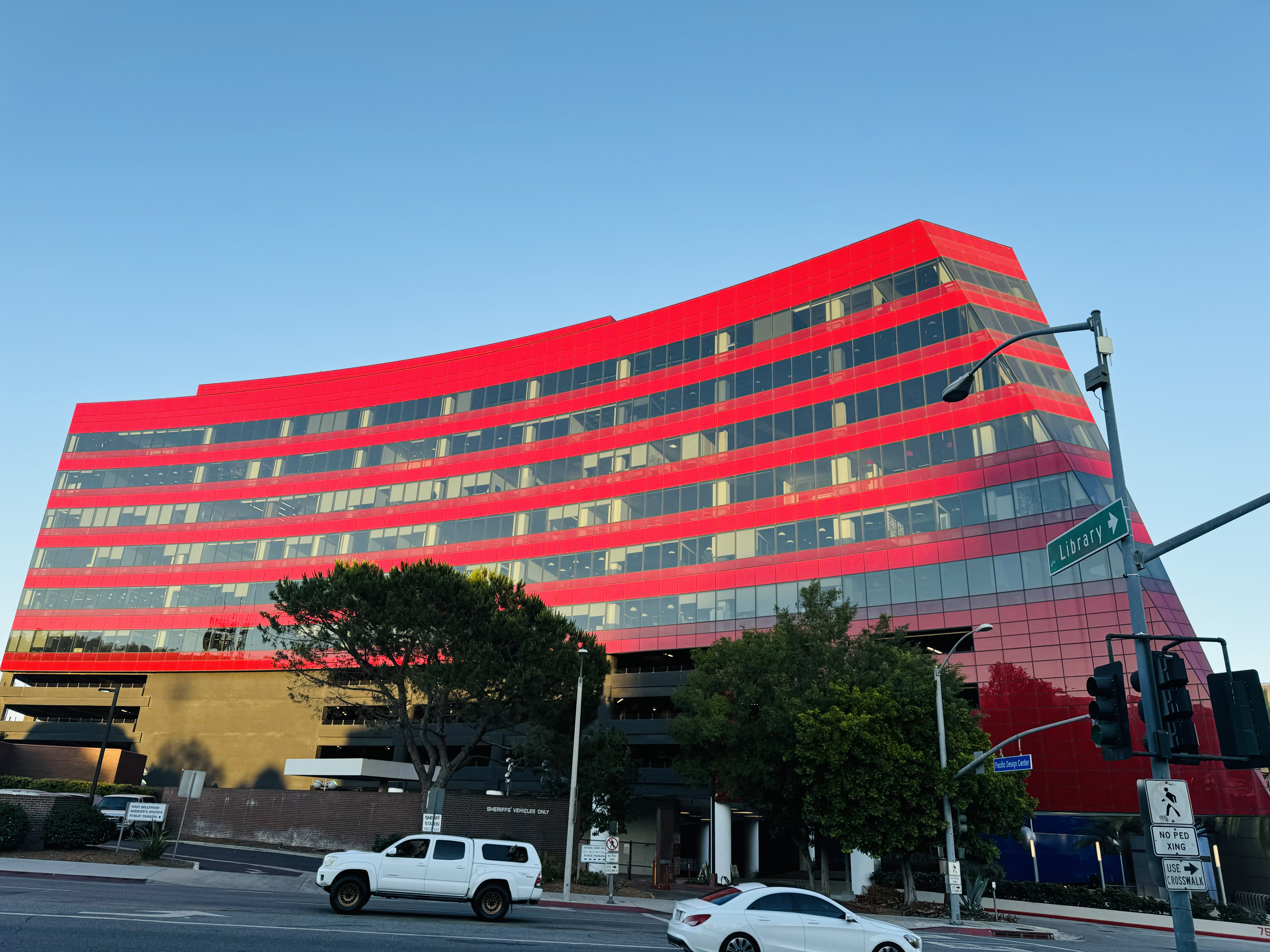
Pacific Design Center- Center Red 2013, César Pelli

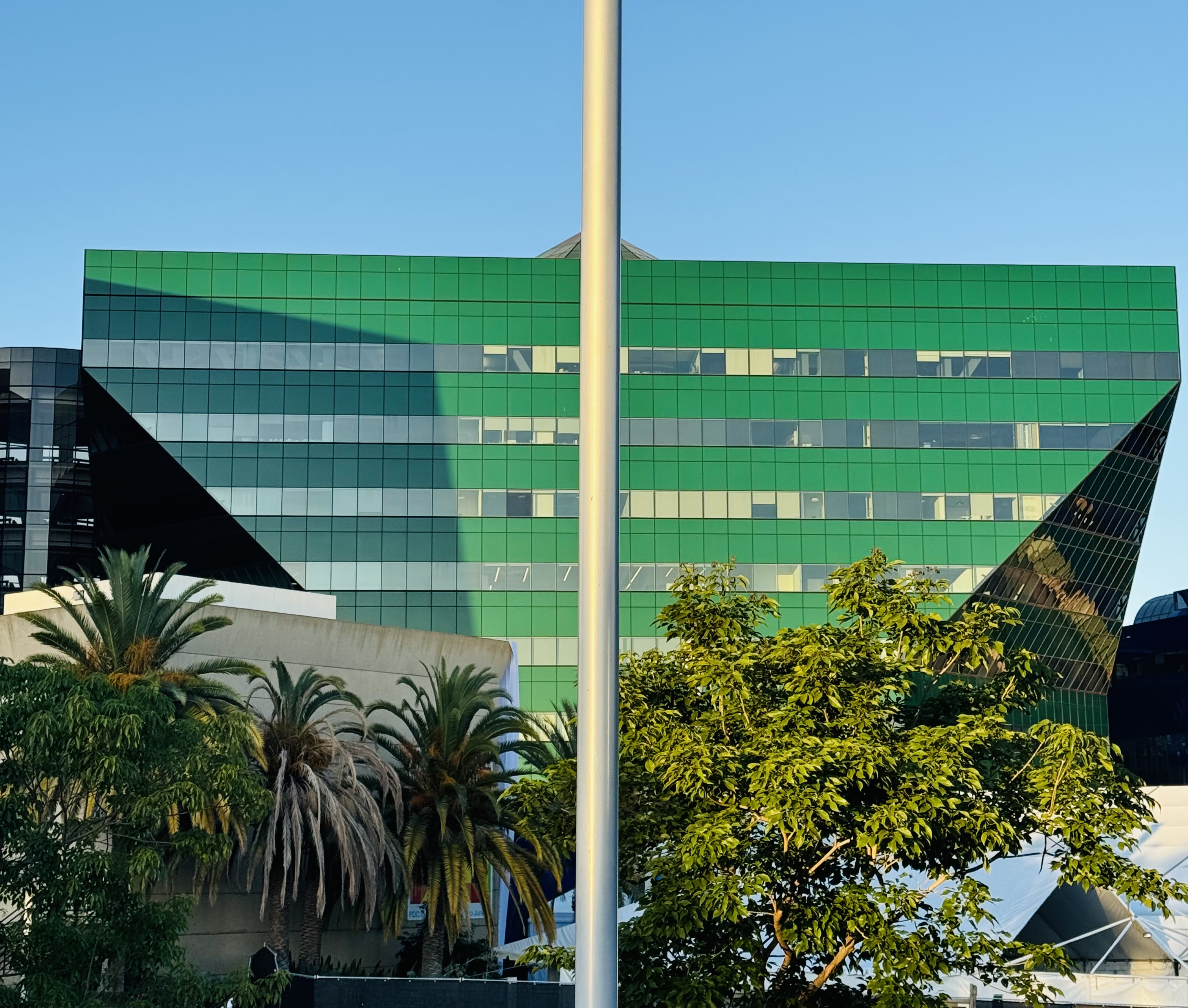
Pacific Design Center- Center Green 1988, César Pelli

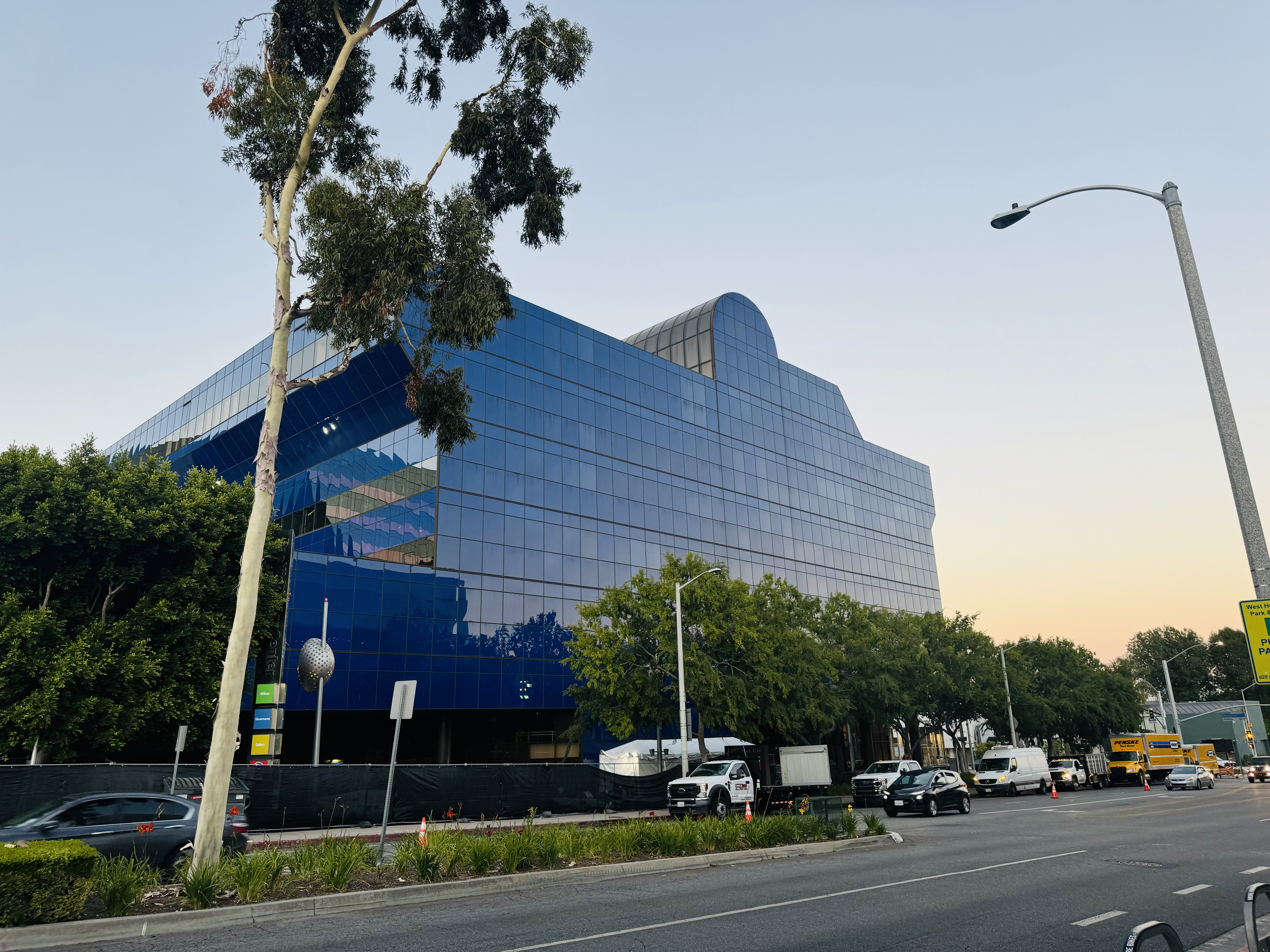
Pacific Design Center- Center Blue 1975, César Pelli

In 1952, Pelli moved to the United States with his wife, Diana Balmori (1932–2016), and became a naturalized citizen in 1964. After his graduation from the University of Illinois School of Architecture, Pelli worked for Eero Saarinen in Bloomfield Hills, Michigan, for ten years. While with Eero, he worked on the TWA terminal at John F. Kennedy International Airport and the Morse and Stiles colleges at Yale University.

In 1964, he became director of design at Daniel, Mann, Johnson and Mendenhall in Los Angeles. In 1965, Pelli designed the Sunset Mountain Park Urban Nucleus (an unbuilt project). In 1968 Pelli became partner for design at Gruen Associates in Los Angeles. In 1969, Pelli designed the COMSAT research and development laboratories in Clarksburg, Maryland. Pelli designed his first landmark building with the Pacific Design Center in West Hollywood, California, which was completed 1975 and became known by the locals as the "Blue Whale". The United States Embassy in Tokyo, Japan, was designed by Pelli in 1972 and completed in 1975. While practicing in Los Angeles, Pelli taught in the architecture program at UCLA.

=== 1977–1989 ===
In 1977, Pelli was selected to be the dean of the Yale School of Architecture in New Haven, Connecticut, and served in that post until 1984. Shortly after Pelli arrived at Yale, he won the commission to design the expansion and renovation of the Museum of Modern Art in New York, which resulted in the establishment of his own firm, Cesar Pelli & Associates. The museum's expansion/renovation and the Museum of Modern Art Residential Tower were completed 1984; the World Financial Center in New York, which includes the grand public space of the Winter Garden, was completed in 1988. Among other significant projects during this period are the Crile Clinic Building in Cleveland, Ohio, completed 1984; Herring Hall at Rice University in Houston, Texas (also completed 1984); completion in 1988 of the Green Building at the Pacific Design Center in West Hollywood, California; completion of the Bank of America Corporate Center in Charlotte, North Carolina in 1989; and the construction of the Wells Fargo Center in Minneapolis, Minnesota, in 1989.

=== 1990–2005 ===
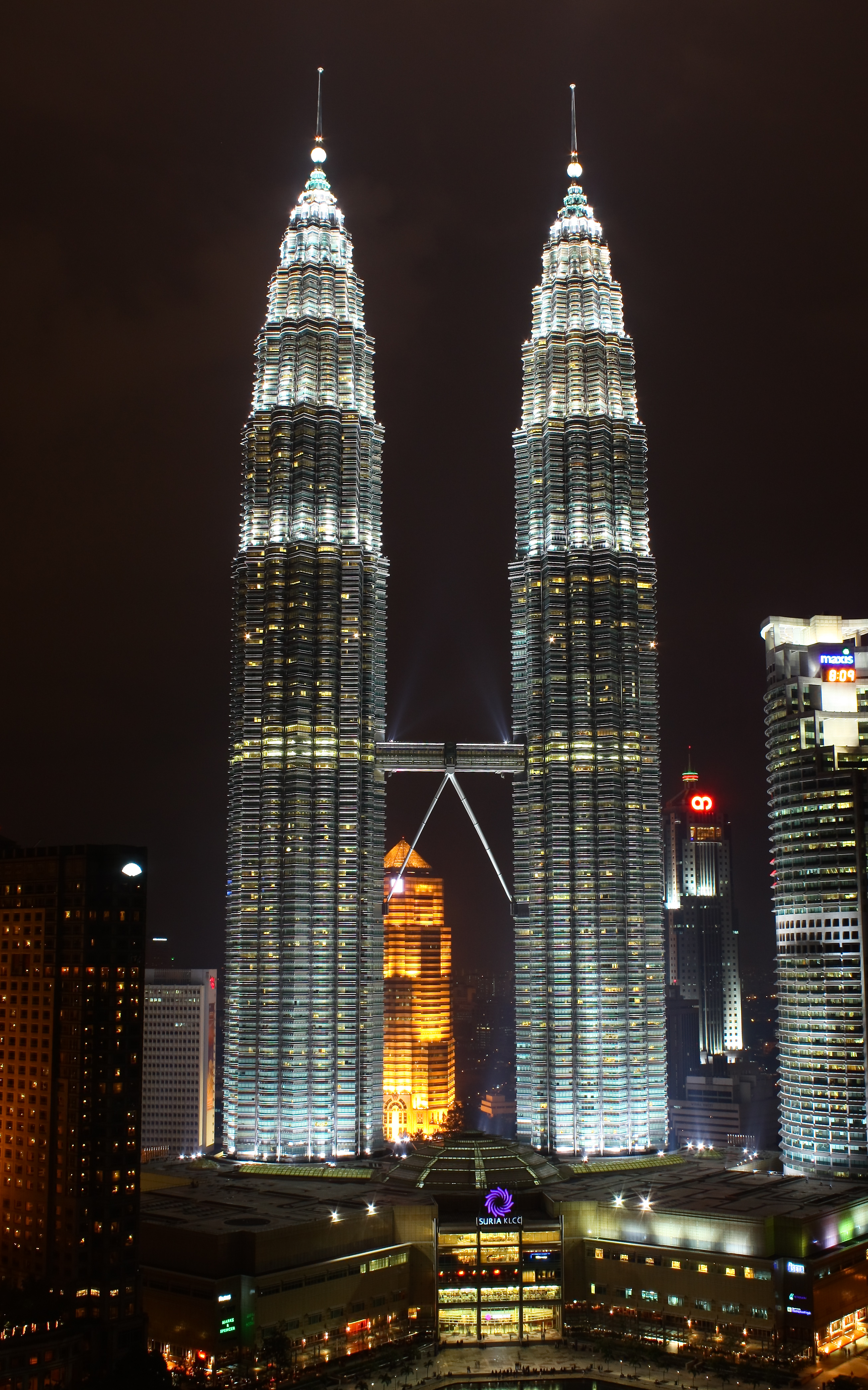
Petronas Towers in Kuala Lumpur

Pelli was named one of the ten most influential living American Architects by the American Institute of Architects in 1991. In 1990, He completed the Carnegie Hall Tower. In 1995, he was awarded the American Institute of Architects Gold Medal. In May 2004, Pelli was awarded an honorary Doctor of Humane Letters degree from the University of Minnesota Duluth where he designed Weber Music Hall. In 2005, Pelli was honored with the Connecticut Architecture Foundation's Distinguished Leadership Award.

Buildings designed by Pelli during this period are marked by further experimentation with a variety of materials (most prominently stainless steel) and his evolution of the skyscraper. One Canada Square at Canary Wharf in London (opened in 1991); Plaza Tower in Costa Mesa, California (completed 1991); and the NTT Headquarters in Tokyo (finished 1995) were preludes to a landmark project that Pelli designed for Kuala Lumpur, Malaysia. The Petronas Towers were completed in 1997, sheathed in stainless steel and reflecting Islamic design motifs. The dual towers were the world's tallest buildings until 2004. That year, Pelli received the Aga Khan Award for Architecture for the design of the Petronas Towers Pelli's design for the National Museum of Art in Osaka, Japan, was completed 2005, the same year that Pelli's firm changed its name to Pelli Clarke Pelli Architects to reflect the growing roles of senior principals Fred W. Clarke and Pelli's son Rafael.

=== 2006–2019 ===
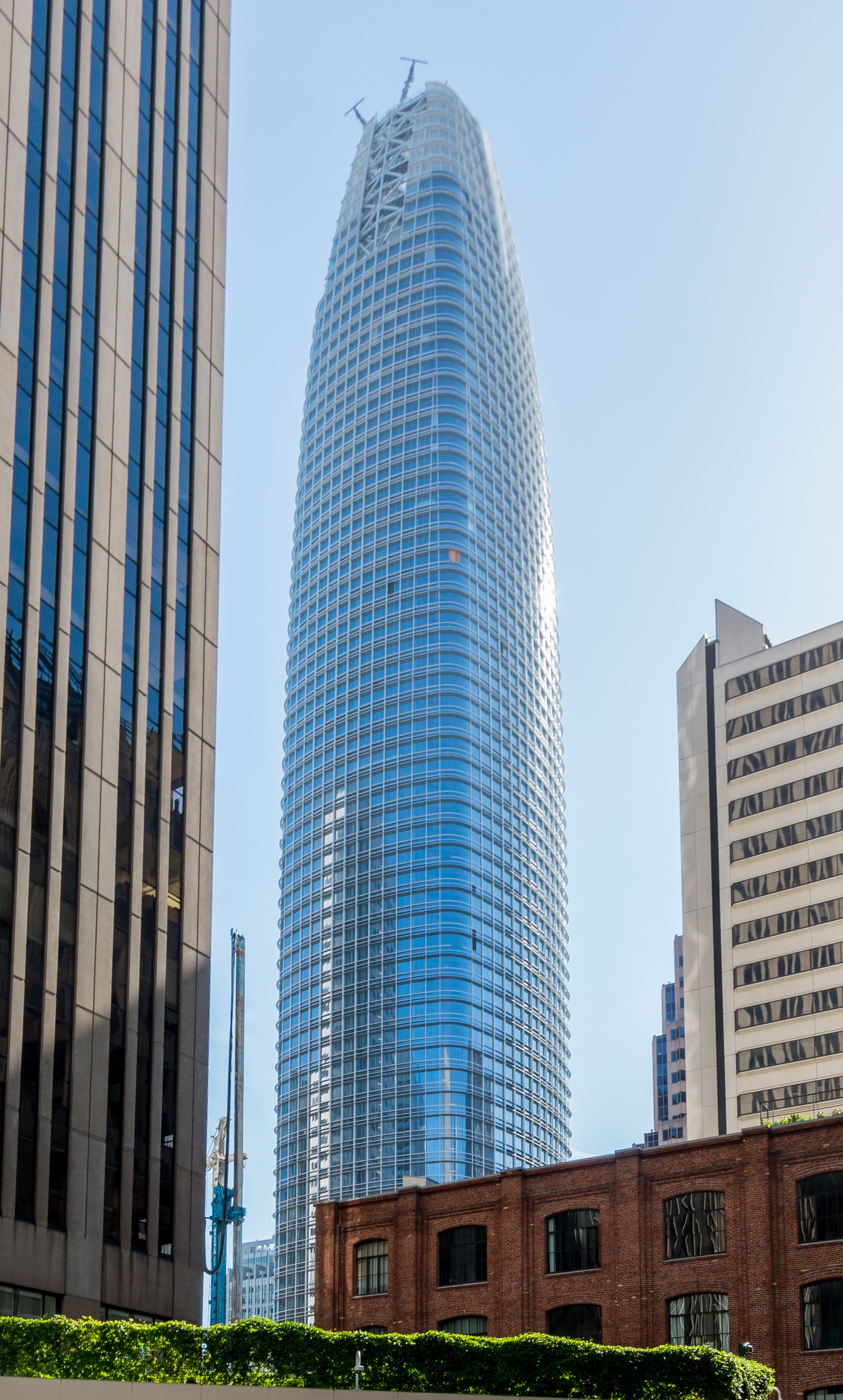
Salesforce Tower, San Francisco

Piazza Gae Aulenti and the UniCredit Tower, Milan

The Cira Centre on the Schuylkill River, designed by Pelli, opened in January 2006. Pelli also designed the master plan for Cira Centre South, near the University of Pennsylvania which was completed in 2014. He was also architect of the 730-foot luxury mixed-use skyscraper FMC Tower as part of the Cira Centre South development.

This period saw the completion of several cultural/civic projects designed by Pelli. The Adrienne Arsht Center for the Performing Arts in Miami, Florida, opened in 2006, the same year that Pelli's design for the Minneapolis Central Library completed construction, as well as the Renee and Henry Segerstrom Concert Hall and Samueli Theater in Costa Mesa, California. Pelli designs for office towers and developments throughout Asia and South America have been completed in the past decade. In 2012, the three-building Pacific Design Center, which Pelli designed 40 years earlier while at Gruen Associates, was completed with the addition of the Red Building.

In May 2008, Pelli was given an honorary Doctor of Arts degree by Yale University. That same year, he received the Lynn S. Beedle Lifetime Achievement Award from the Council on Tall Buildings and Urban Habitat (CTBUH). In 2012, Pelli was honored with the platinum Konex Award for architecture and the diamond Konex Award for visual arts.

Major projects completed in the 2010s included The Landmark in Abu Dhabi, Sevilla Tower in Seville, Spain and Piazza Gae Aulenti and the UniCredit Tower in Milan, Italy. In 2018, the Salesforce Tower and the first phase of the adjacent Salesforce Transit Center in San Francisco were completed. The Salesforce Tower was named the world's best tall building by CTBUH in 2019 which is the year when Pelli died.

== Death ==
Pelli died at the age of 92 at his home in New Haven, Connecticut. No cause was given. Malaysian Prime Minister Mahathir Mohamad, whose tenure witnessed the designing and construction of the Twin Towers, praised him as a "great architect" while expressing his condolences to Pelli's surviving family members. Pelli's Azabudai Hills in Tokyo, Japan, was completed on June 30, 2023, making it the tallest building in Japan at the time of completion.

== Publications ==
- 1982: "Skyscrapers", Perspecta 18, pp. 134–151
- 1984: Introduction to The Second Generation by Esther McCoy (Peregrine Smith Books)
- 1999: Observations for Young Architects (Monacelli Press)
- 2001: Petronas Towers: The Architecture of High Construction co-authored with Michael J. Crosbie (Wiley-Academy)
- 2002: Foreword to Ralph Rapson: Sketches and Drawings from Around the World by Ralph Rapson (Afton Historical Society Press)
