= Walnut (disambiguation) =

A walnut is the nut of any tree of the genus Juglans.

Walnut may also refer to:

== Trees and fruit ==
- Juglans regia, the Persian, English, or common walnut, a tree which produces most of the walnuts sold as food
- Juglans, the genus of trees that produce walnuts
- Endiandra, a genus of trees from south east Asia, Australia and the Pacific
- Coula edulis, African walnut, a tree in the family Olacaceae

== Timber ==
- see Juglans#Wood

== Places ==
=== United States ===
- Walnut, California, a city
- Walnut, Georgia, a ghost town
- Walnut, Illinois, a village
- Walnut, Indiana, an unincorporated community
- Walnut, Iowa, a city
- Walnut, Kansas, a city
- Walnut, Mississippi, a town
- Walnut, Missouri, an unincorporated community
- Walnut, Nebraska, an unincorporated community
- Walnut, North Carolina, an unincorporated community
- Walnut, Ohio, an unincorporated community
- Walnut Canyon National Monument, Arizona
- Walnut Hall (Durham, North Carolina), a plantation in North Carolina
- Walnut–Locust station, a subway station in Philadelphia
- Walnut River (Kansas) and Little Walnut River, rivers in Kansas
- Walnut Springs, Texas, a city

=== United Kingdom ===
- Walnut Tree, Milton Keynes, England

== Other uses ==
- Paulie Walnuts, a fictional character from the HBO series The Sopranos
- Walnut elimia, a North American gastropod
- Walnut sauce, used in different dishes
- Walnut Whales, a 2002 folk music EP by Joanna Newsom
- Walnut Whip, British confection
- Walnut (crane), a white-naped crane known for bonding with her zookeeper

== See also ==
- Walnut Bend (disambiguation)
- Walnut Creek (disambiguation)
- Walnut Grove (disambiguation)
- Walnut Hill (disambiguation)
- Walnut Lake (disambiguation)
- Walnut Park (disambiguation)
- Walnut Street (disambiguation)
- Walnut Township (disambiguation)
- Walnut Tree (disambiguation)
