= Walnut Creek =

Walnut Creek may refer to:

== Communities ==
- Walnut Creek, Arizona
- Walnut Creek, California
  - Walnut Creek station, a BART station
- Walnut Creek, North Carolina
- Walnut Creek, Ohio

== Streams ==
- Walnut Creek (Arizona), in Coconino County
- Walnut Creek (Big Chino Wash), in Yavapai County, Arizona; see Aztec Pass
- Walnut Creek (Contra Costa County), California
- Walnut Creek (Southern California)
- Walnut Creek (Ocmulgee River tributary), in Georgia
- Walnut Creek (Oconee River tributary), in Georgia
- Walnut Creek (South River tributary), in Georgia
- Walnut Creek (Raccoon River tributary), in Iowa
- Walnut Creek (West Nishnabotna River tributary), a stream in Iowa
- Walnut Creek (White Rock Creek tributary), in Kansas
- Walnut Creek and Dry Walnut Creek, in Great Bend, Kansas
- Walnut Creek, a tributary of Waconda Lake in Kansas
- Walnut Creek (Marais des Cygnes River tributary), in Kansas and Missouri
- Walnut Creek (East Fork Little Chariton River tributary), in Missouri
- Walnut Creek (Flat Creek tributary), in Missouri
- Walnut Creek (Little Sac River tributary), in Missouri
- Walnut Creek (Animas Valley, New Mexico)
- Walnut Creek (Playas Valley, New Mexico)
- Walnut Creek (Neuse River tributary), in North Carolina
- Walnut Creek (Lake Erie), in Pennsylvania
- Walnut Creek (Central Texas)
- Walnut Creek (Tarrant County), Texas, a tributary of Joe Pool Lake
- Walnut Creek (Wise County), Texas, a tributary of the Trinity River

== Other ==
- Walnut Creek Amphitheatre, now Coastal Credit Union Music Park, in Raleigh, North Carolina
- Walnut Creek CDROM, a 1990s freeware and shareware provider
- Walnut Creek State Park, a former protected area in Oklahoma, permanently closed in 2014
- Walnut Creek Middle School, in the Walled Lake Consolidated Schools District, Michigan
- Walnut Creek Middle School, in the Millcreek Township School District, Pennsylvania
