= Walnut Township, Indiana =

Walnut Township, Indiana may refer to one of the following places:

- Walnut Township, Marshall County, Indiana
- Walnut Township, Montgomery County, Indiana

See also

- Walnut Township (disambiguation)
