= Walnut Township, Ohio =

Walnut Township, Ohio may refer to:

- Walnut Township, Fairfield County, Ohio
- Walnut Township, Gallia County, Ohio
- Walnut Township, Pickaway County, Ohio

== See also ==
- Walnut Township (disambiguation)
