= Walnut Street =

Walnut Street may refer to:

- Walnut Street (Louisville), former name of a large section of Muhammad Ali Boulevard
- Walnut Street (Philadelphia)
- Walnut Street (Pittsburgh)
- Walnut Street station (disambiguation), stations of the name

== See also ==
- Walnut Street Bridge (disambiguation)
