= Walnut Street station =

Walnut Street station may refer to:

- Walnut Street station (SEPTA), a SEPTA trolley station in Upper Darby, Pennsylvania
- Walnut–Locust station, a SEPTA subway station in Philadelphia, Pennsylvania
- Walnut Street (NJT station), an NJ Transit station in Montclair, New Jersey

== See also ==
- Walnut Street (disambiguation)
