= Walnut Street Bridge =

Walnut Street Bridge may refer to:

Bridges in the United States (by state then city)

- Walnut Street Bridge (Wilmington, Delaware), a bridge that spans the Christina River in Wilmington, Delaware
- Walnut Street Bridge (Mazeppa, Minnesota), listed on the National Register of Historic Places in Wabasha County, Minnesota
- Walnut Street Bridge (Harrisburg, Pennsylvania), a truss bridge that spans the Susquehanna River, listed on the National Register of Historic Places in Dauphin County, Pennsylvania
- Walnut Street Bridge (Philadelphia), a bridge that spans the Schuylkill River
- Walnut Street Bridge (Yankton, South Dakota), listed on the National Register of Historic Places in Yankton County, South Dakota
- Walnut Street Bridge (Chattanooga, Tennessee), a truss bridge across the Tennessee River, listed on the National Register of Historic Places in Hamilton County, Tennessee
