= Pennsylvania Route 105 =

State highway in Pennsylvania, United States

State Route 1005
- Drexel Avenue, Eagle Road, Wynnewood Road
- Map of Delaware County in southeastern Pennsylvania with SR 1005 highlighted in red

Route information
- Maintained by PennDOT
- Length: 3.3 mi (5.3 km)
- Existed: 1987–present

Major junctions
- South end: US 1 / Drexel Road in Upper Darby Township
- PA 3 in Haverford Township
- North end: SR 3046 / County Line Road in Haverford Township

Location
- Country: United States
- State: Pennsylvania
- Counties: Delaware

Highway system
- Pennsylvania State Route System; Interstate; US; State; Scenic; Legislative
← PA 104	→ PA 106

State Route 1005 is a short, 3.3-mile-long (5.3 km) road located in Delaware County in Pennsylvania.

== History ==
A portion of SR 1005 was Pennsylvania Route 105. The western terminus was at PA 3 in Havertown. The eastern terminus was at US 30/PA 201 in Ardmore.

In 1987, a Location Referencing System (LRS) was established to define roadways that the Pennsylvania Department of Transportation deemed important. The system added the concept of a quadrant route, a road given a uniform four digit number between 1000 and 4000 that was unique per county. Quadrant routes would only be signed in little white markers placed at major intersections. With the creation of the LRS; Drexel Avenue, Eagle Road, and Wynnewood Road were assigned the number of 1005.

== Major intersections ==
The entire route is in Delaware County.

Location	mi	km	Destinations	Notes
Upper Darby Township	0.0	0.0	US 1 (Township Line Road)	Southern terminus of SR 1005
Haverford Township	0.4	0.64	SR 1004 (Steel Road)	Eastern terminus of SR 1004
Haverford Township	0.7	1.1	SR 1002 (Manoa Road)	Western terminus of SR 1028
Haverford Township	1.0	1.6	PA 3 (West Chester Pike)	
Haverford Township	1.7	2.7	SR 1016 (Lawrence Road)	Eastern terminus of SR 1007
Haverford Township	2.2	3.5	SR 2005 (Darby Road)	
Haverford Township	2.3	3.7	SR 1011 (East Darby Road)	Northern terminus of SR 1011
Haverford Township	2.9	4.7	SR 1003 (Earlington Road)	Northern terminus of SR 1003
Haverford Township	3.0	4.8	SR 1001 (Haverford Road)	Formerly part of PA 201
Haverford Township	3.3	5.3	SR 3046 (Wynnewood Road/County Line Road)	SR 3046 continues into Lower Merion Township
1.000 mi = 1.609 km; 1.000 km = 0.621 mi
