= Market Street Bridge (Philadelphia) =

Bridge across Schuylkill River in Philadelphia

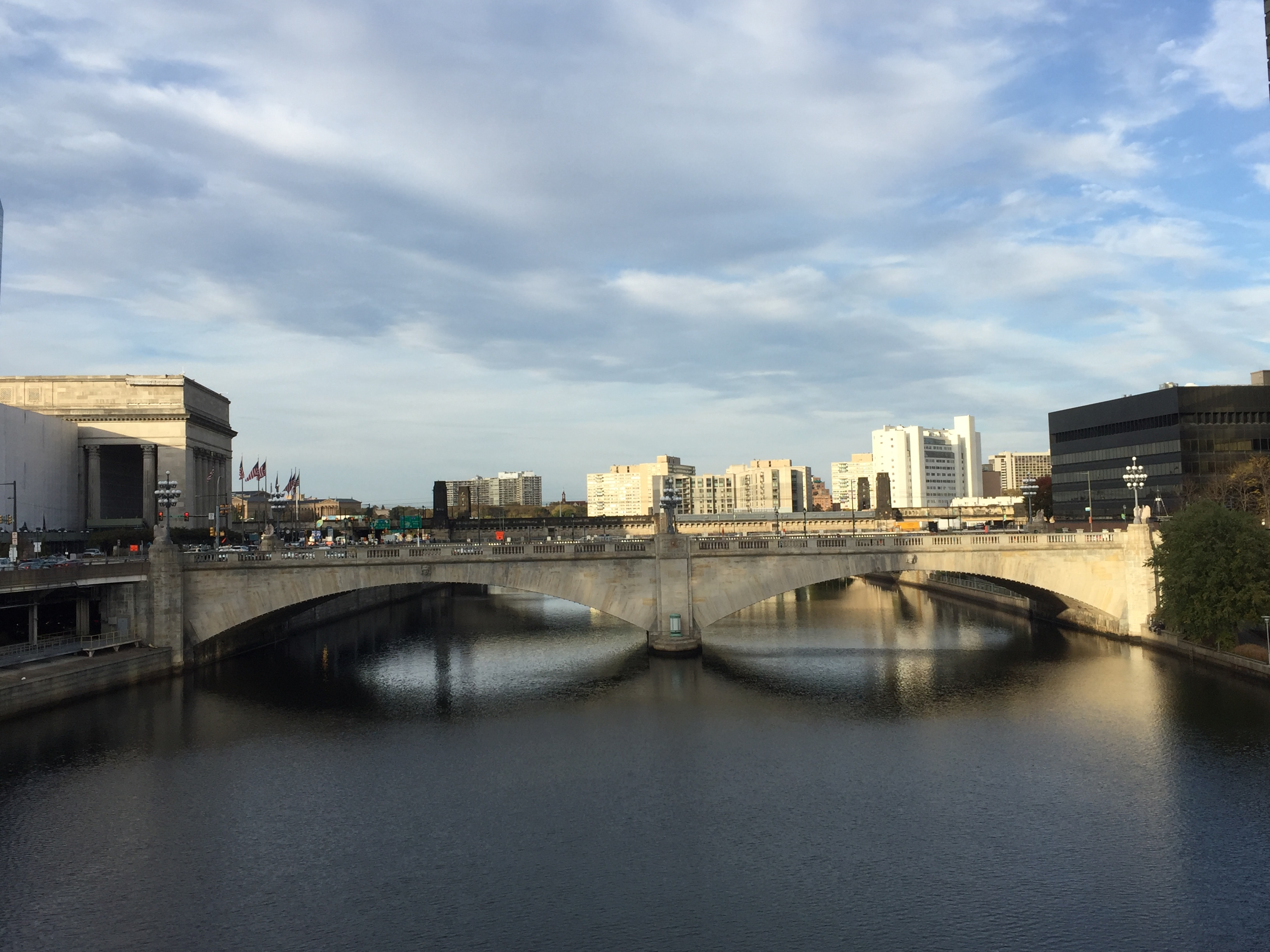
- Market Street Bridge in Philadelphia, November 2017
- Coordinates: 39°57′16″N 75°10′49″W
- Carries: PA 3 eastbound (Market Street)
- Crosses: Schuylkill River
- Locale: Philadelphia
- Other name(s): Permanent Bridge; High Street Bridge

Characteristics
- Design: Covered Arch (1805)
- Material: Wood (1805)
- Total length: 400 feet (120 m)
- Piers in water: 2 (1805); 1 (1932)

History
- Designer: Timothy Palmer (1805)
- Opened: 1805

Location
- Interactive map of Market Street Bridge

The Market Street Bridge carries Market Street (Pennsylvania Route 3 eastbound), the primary east-west street in Philadelphia, Pennsylvania, across the Schuylkill River. The current bridge is the fifth permanent structure built at the site.

== Middle Ferry ==
A ferry was established at or near this location by 1673. It came to be called the "Middle Ferry," because a ferry operated upstream (Upper Ferry) and another downstream (Lower Ferry).

Early in the Revolutionary War, American General Israel Putnam built a pontoon bridge at the Middle Ferry site, made of floating logs bound together by rope. This was intentionally destroyed to prevent its falling into the hands of the British. The British Army built its own pontoon bridge at the site during the 1777-78 Occupation of Philadelphia. It washed away in 1780. Its replacement washed away in 1784. That was succeeded by a plank-floor bridge also built on floating logs. Market Street was originally known as "High Street," and this floating bridge was the final link in the Philadelphia and Lancaster Turnpike.

== First bridge - Schuylkill Permanent Bridge ==
When the directors of the Schuylkill Permanent Bridge Company of Philadelphia elected in 1801 to build a wooden structure across the Schuylkill instead of the stone arch bridge originally planned, they called on Timothy Palmer to complete the job. Palmer (1751–1821) was the best-known wooden bridge builder in the country, and the resulting bridge became his best-known work. Palmer and his workmen completed the structure on two previously-built piers at a cost of US$300,000. Known then as "The Permanent Bridge," it had an overall length of 495 feet (151 m), with a center span of 195 feet (59 m) and a 12-foot (3.7 m) rise. The two side spans were 150 feet (46 m) each. Supposedly, this was the first permanent bridge over a major American river, as well as the world's first bridge with regular masonry piers in deep water.

The trusswork was sufficiently completed on January 1, 1805, to permit the bridge to be opened to traffic. But the president of the bridge company asked Palmer if the bridge wouldn't last longer if it was protected from the wind and rain by a weatherproof covering. Palmer said that the bridge's life span might be increased from ten-twelve years to thirty-forty years if a roof and sidewalls were added. Thus was created the first covered bridge in America.

About 1812, the bridge was adorned with wooden allegorical figures carved by sculptor William Rush. Commerce was installed over the west portal, and Agriculture over the east portal.

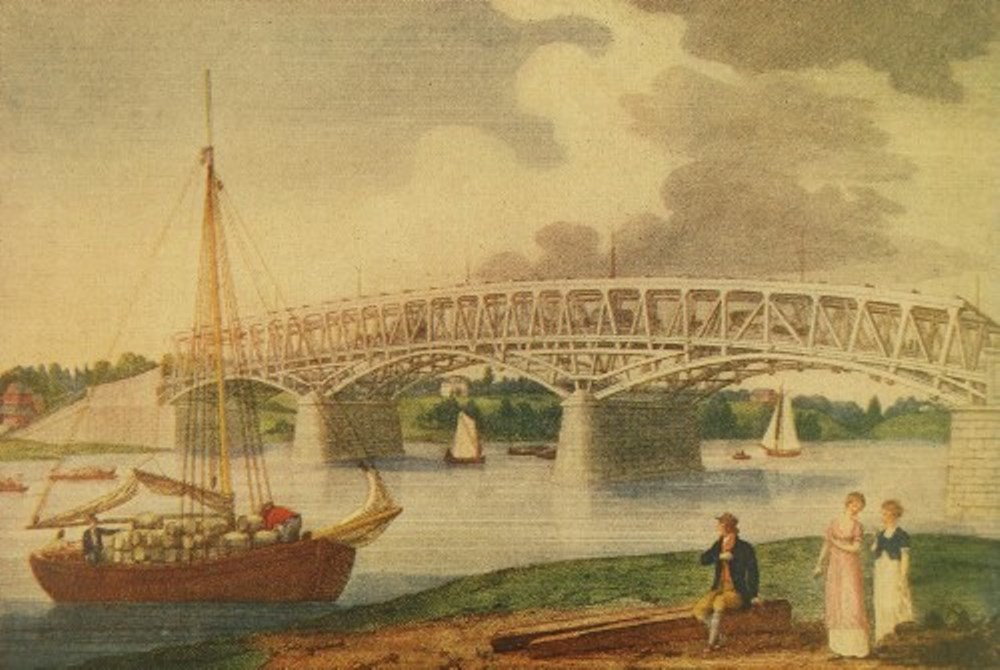
"High Street Bridge, before the bridge was covered." (1805) by William Birch.

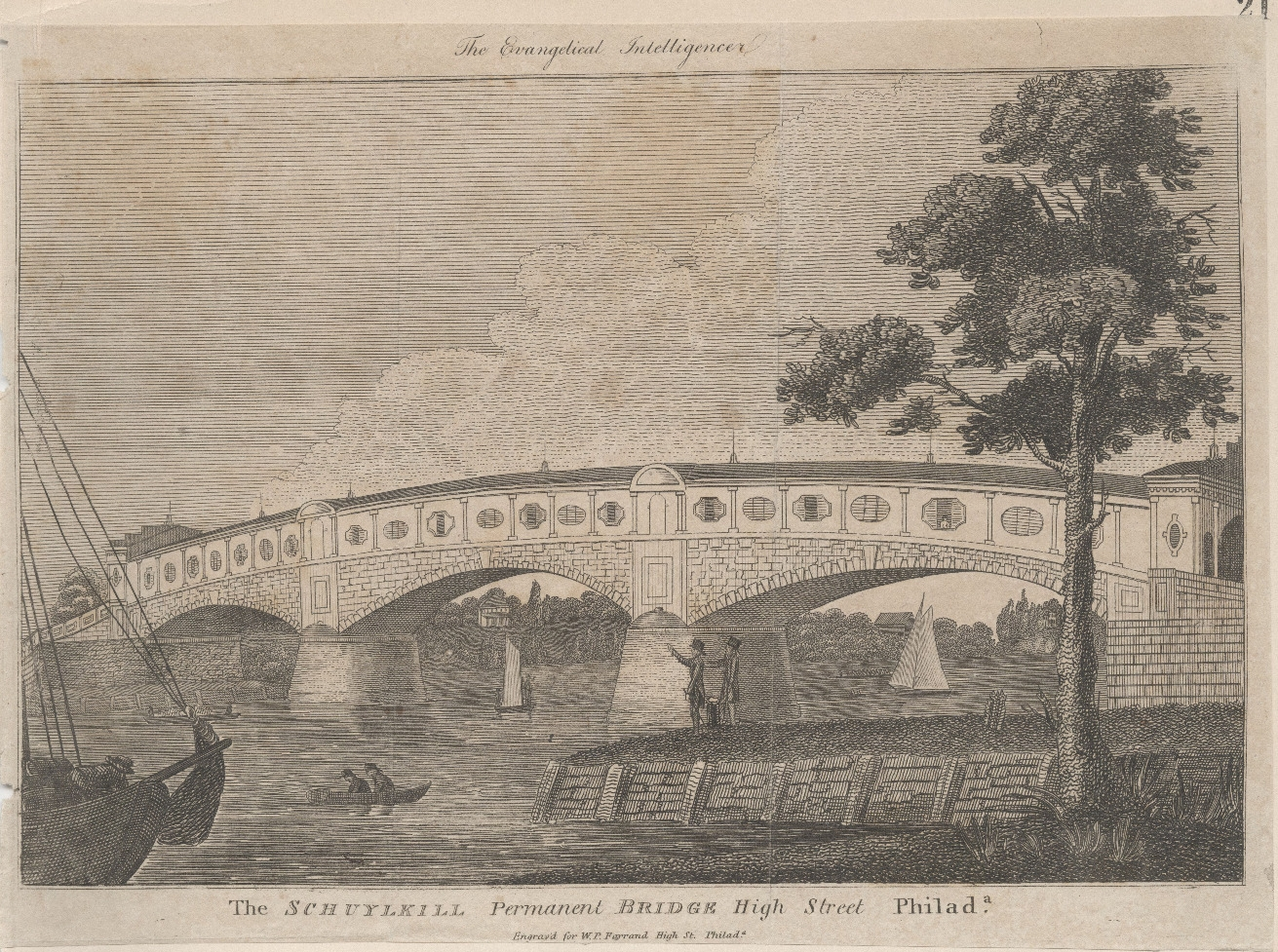
High Street Bridge after it was covered, c1820

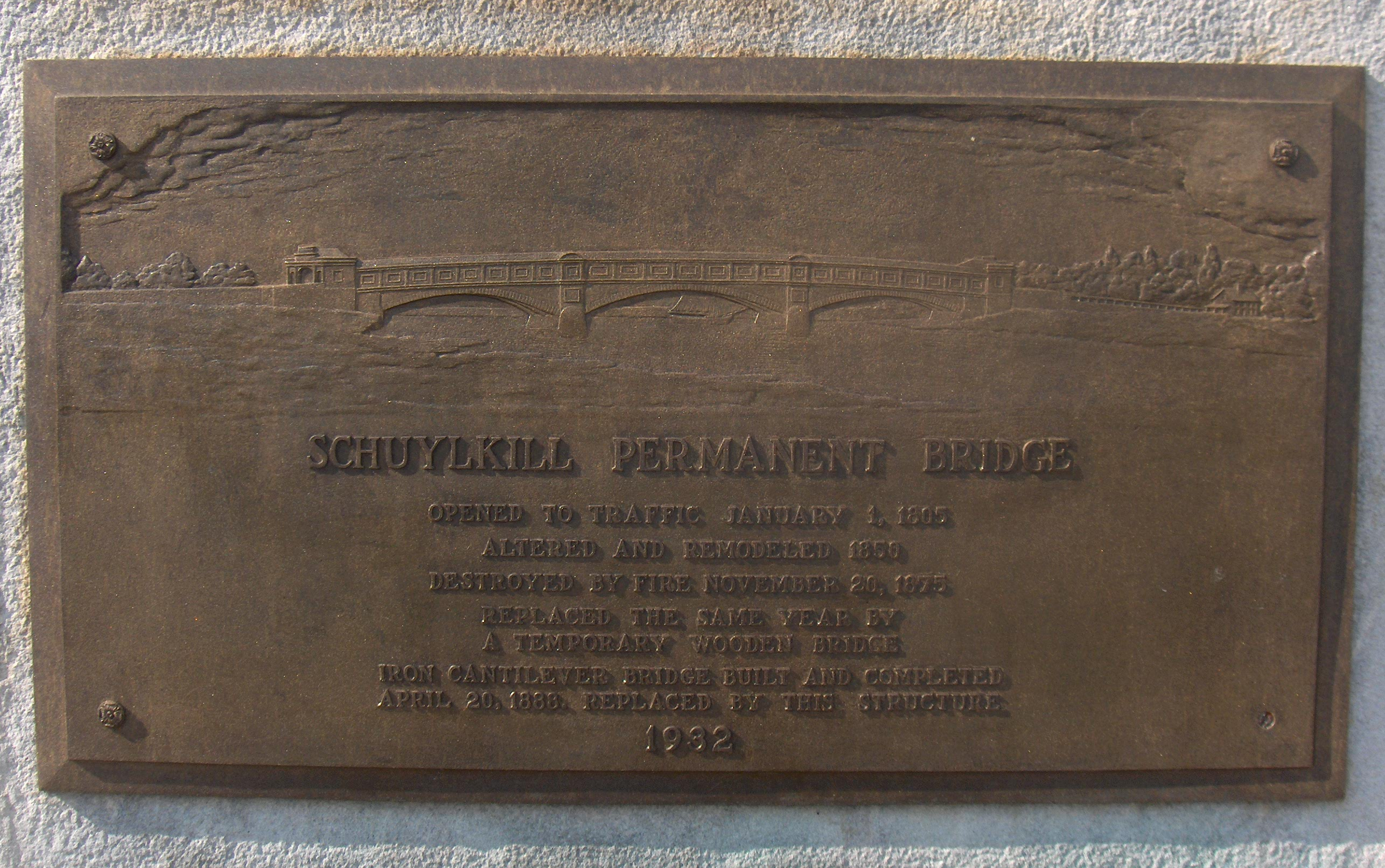
Schuylkill Permanent Bridge, (1801–1875). Plaque at center of current bridge.

== Second bridge ==
As Palmer had predicted, the bridge stood with little attention until 1850, when a fire gutted it. It was rebuilt and widened for an additional railroad car track, as by then it was also used for railroad traffic. The second Market Street Bridge lasted until 1875, when it was completely destroyed by another fire.

== Third bridge ==
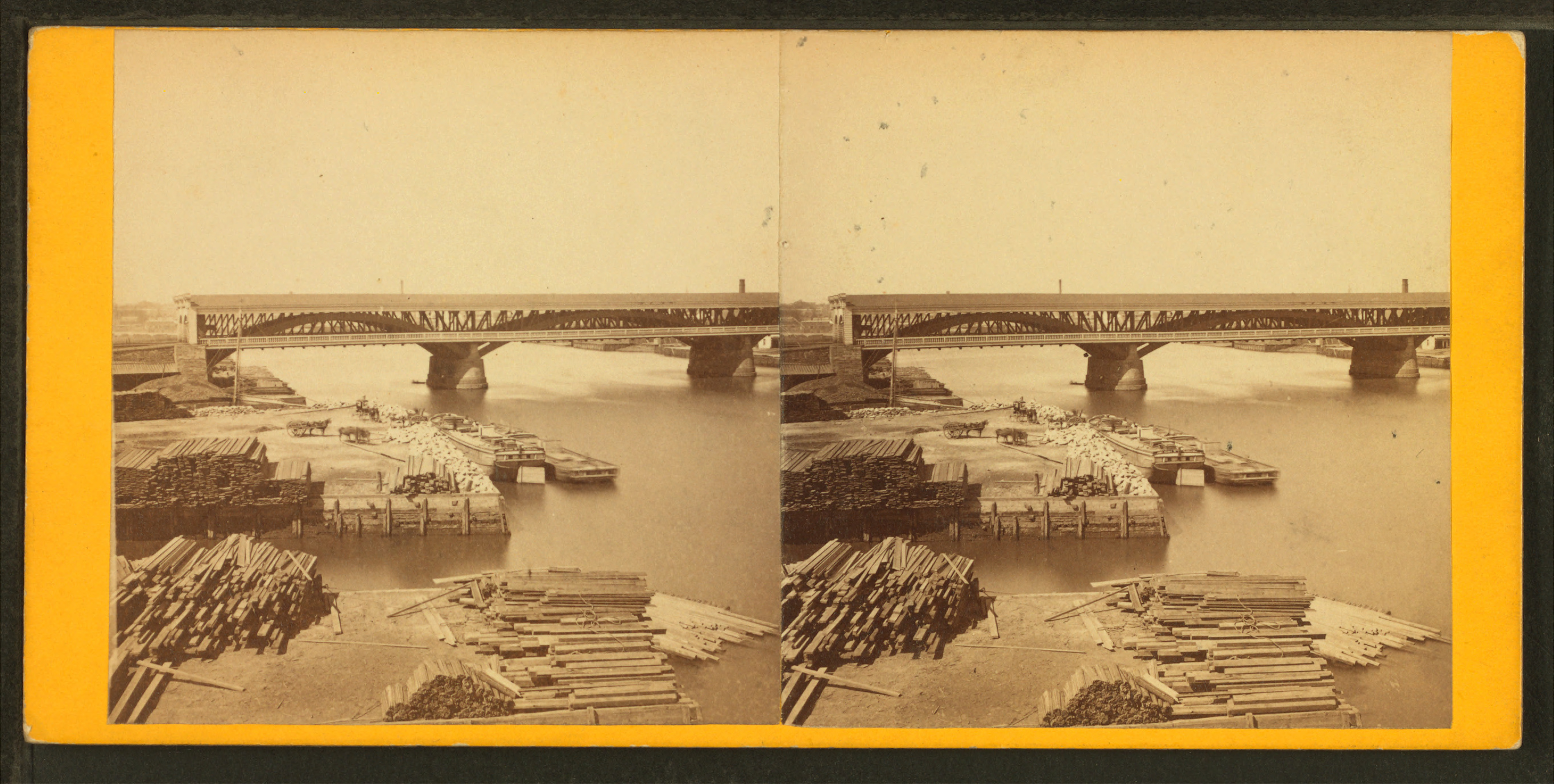
Third Market Street Bridge (1875-88)

The third bridge was a wooden structure and had the shortest tenure, lasting only 13 years, 1875-88.

== Fourth bridge ==
The fourth bridge had three spans and a wrought-iron cantilever structure. It was built in 1888, replacing the 3rd bridge. Its piers were built on the foundations of the Schuylkill Permanent Bridge. Its width was 77 feet, its two side spans were each 98 feet, and its center span was 215 feet including a 76-foot suspended section.

== Fifth (current) bridge ==
The current Market Street Bridge was erected in 1932, complete with balustrades and other decorative elements. The four eagle statues on the east and west approaches were salvaged from New York's Pennsylvania Station, donated to the City of Philadelphia by the Pennsylvania Railroad after Penn Station was demolished in 1963. The Market Street Bridge is across from Philadelphia's 30th Street Station, built and formerly owned by the Pennsylvania Railroad.

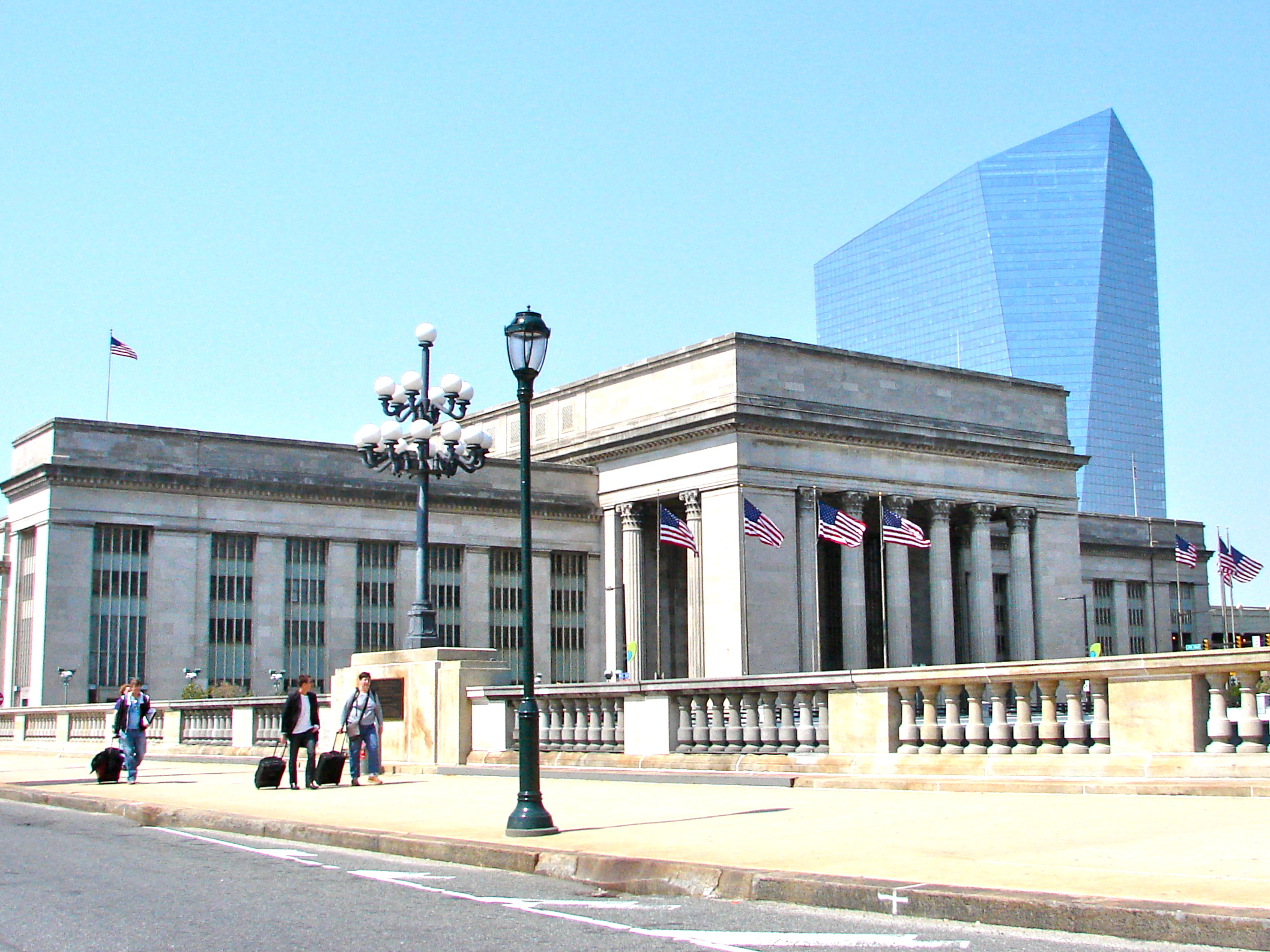
Current bridge, with 30th Street Station and Cira Centre in the background

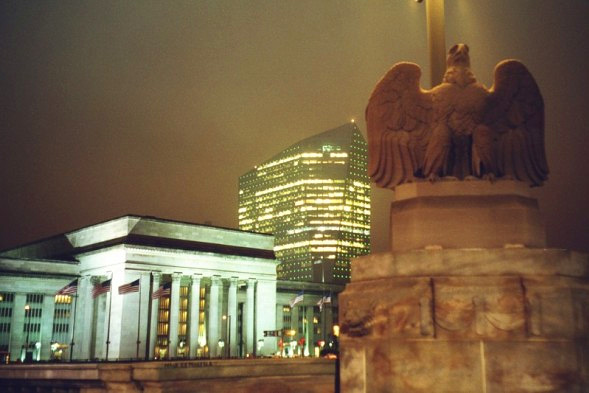
Eagles salvaged from Pennsylvania Station, New York flank the bridge's approaches.

== See also ==
- List of crossings of the Schuylkill River
