= John F. Kennedy Boulevard Bridge =

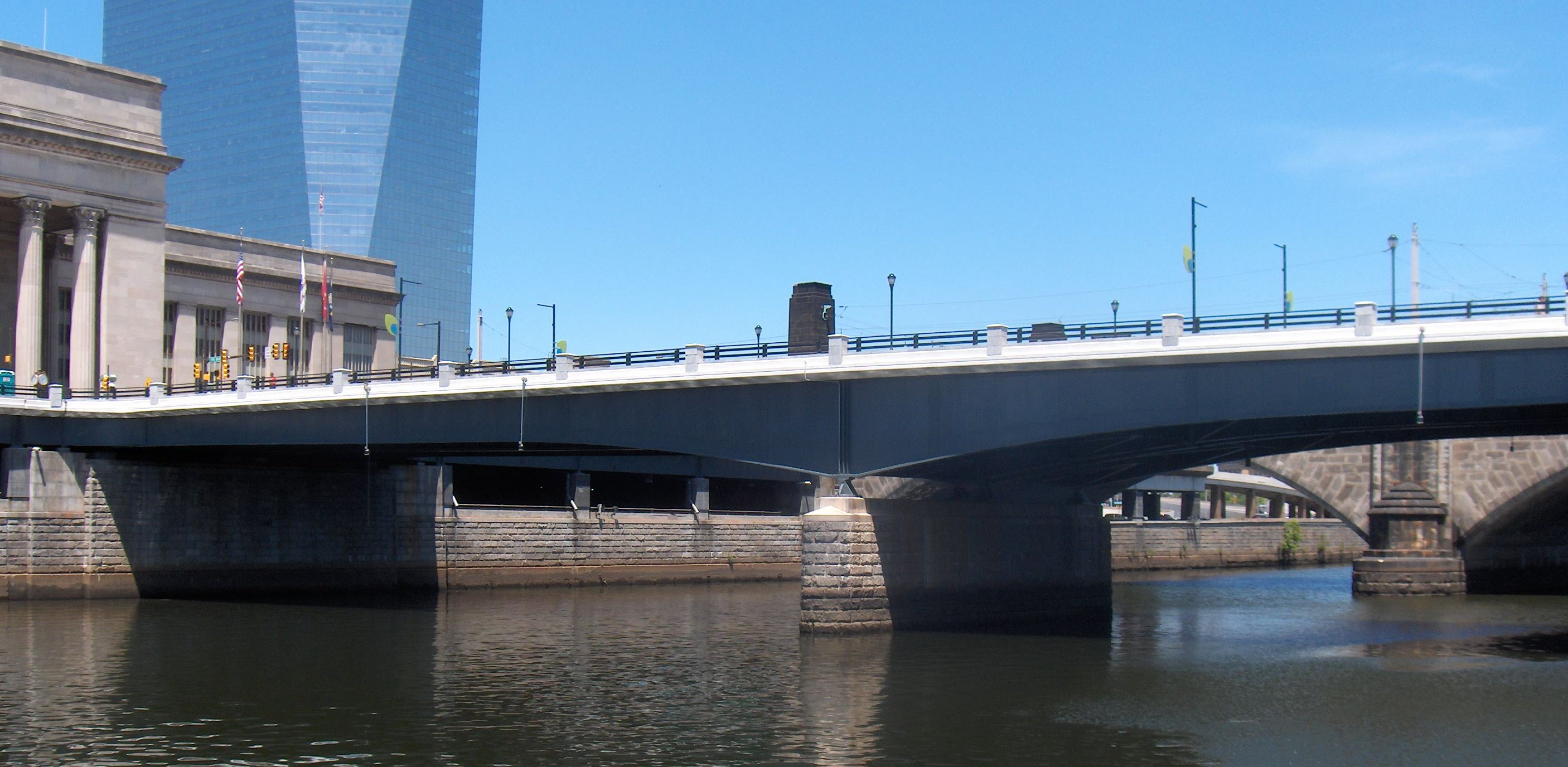
- John F. Kennedy Boulevard Bridge, with 30th Street Station and the Cira Centre, 10 August 2010
- Coordinates: 39.95545°N 75.18000°W
- Carries: PA 3 westbound (John F. Kennedy Boulevard)
- Crosses: Schuylkill River, CSX Transportation tracks, Schuylkill River Trail
- Locale: Philadelphia, Pennsylvania
- Official name: John F. Kennedy Boulevard Bridge
- Other name(s): JFK Boulevard Bridge, Pennsylvania Boulevard Bridge
- Owner: Pennsylvania Department of Transportation
- Maintained by: PennDOT
- ID number: 670095015000000

Characteristics
- Design: girder and floorbeam system
- Material: Steel
- Total length: 487.9 feet
- Width: 47.9 feet
- No. of spans: 3
- Piers in water: 2

History
- Constructed by: PennDOT
- Construction end: 1959
- Opened: 1959, reconstructed 2009

Statistics
- Daily traffic: 2,629 as of 2009

The John F. Kennedy Boulevard Bridge was built in 1959 and reconstructed 2009 by the Pennsylvania Department of Transportation. It carries three lanes (two lanes westbound, one lane eastbound) of John F. Kennedy Boulevard (Pennsylvania Route 3 westbound, known as Pennsylvania Boulevard until 1963) across the Schuylkill River, Schuylkill River Trail, and CSX Transportation tracks. The overpass continues east, passing over 23rd, 22nd, and 21st streets to terminate at 20th Street. The bridge runs parallel to the SEPTA Regional Rail's Main Line tracks.

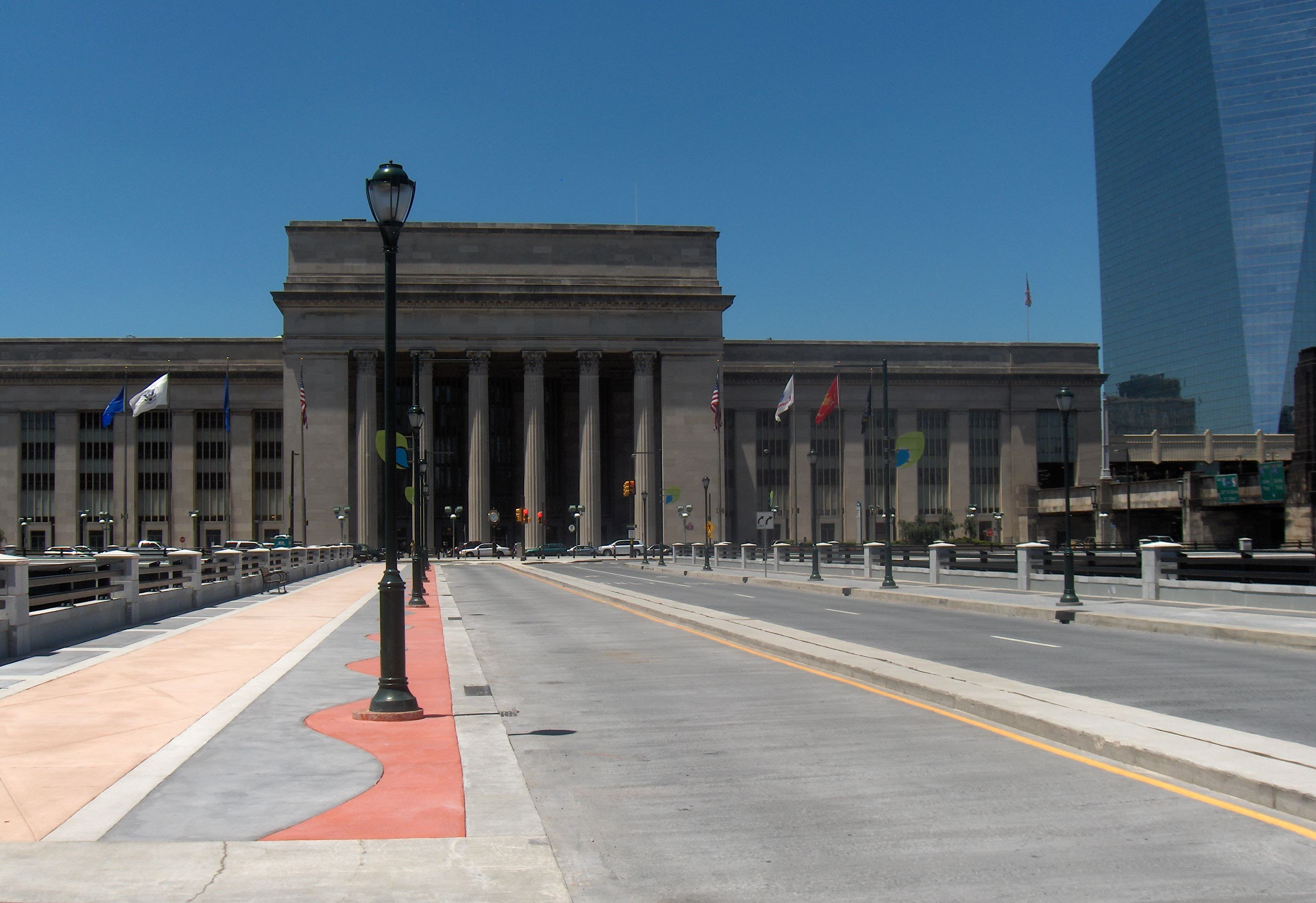
John F. Kennedy Boulevard Bridge, looking west towards the 30th Street Station, with the Cira Centre on the right, 10 August 2010

== See also ==
- List of crossings of the Schuylkill River
- List of memorials to John F. Kennedy
