= Walnut Tree (disambiguation) =

A walnut tree is any species of tree in the plant genus Juglans, the seeds of which are referred to as walnuts.

Walnut Tree may also refer to:

- Walnut Tree, Milton Keynes, a district in the civil parish of Walton, Milton Keynes, England
- Walnut Tree (2015 film), a Kazakhstani film by Yerlan Nurmukhambetov
- Walnut Tree (2020 film), an Iranian film by Mohammad Hossein Mahdavian
- "Walnut Tree", a B-side to the 2004 single "Somewhere Only We Know" by British group Keane
- Walnut Tree Records, a UK based record label
- Coula edulis or African walnut, a tree in the family Olacaceae
- The Walnut Tree, a fable

== See also ==
- Walnut, the nut of any tree of the genus Juglans
- Walnut (disambiguation)
