= Pennsylvania Route 3 =

State highway in Pennsylvania, US

Pennsylvania Route 3

Route information
- Maintained by PennDOT, Borough of West Chester, and City of Philadelphia
- Length: 24.326 mi (39.149 km)
- Existed: 1937–present

Major junctions
- West end: US 322 Bus. in West Chester
- US 202 / US 322 near West Chester; PA 352 in Westtown Township; PA 926 in Willistown Township; PA 252 in Newtown Square; PA 320 in Broomall; I-476 near Broomall; US 1 near Havertown; US 13 in Philadelphia; I-76 in Philadelphia
- East end: PA 611 in Philadelphia

Location
- Country: United States
- State: Pennsylvania
- Counties: Chester, Delaware, Philadelphia

Highway system
- Pennsylvania State Route System; Interstate; US; State; Scenic; Legislative
← PA 2	→ PA 4

Pennsylvania Route 3 (PA 3) is a 24.3-mile (39.1 km) state highway located in the southeastern portion of Pennsylvania. The route runs from U.S. Route 322 Business (US 322 Bus.) in West Chester east to PA 611 (Broad Street) in Philadelphia.

The route begins in downtown West Chester and heads east out of the borough as a one-way pair of streets. Between West Chester and Upper Darby, PA 3 follows a four-lane divided highway named West Chester Pike through suburban areas. Along this stretch, the route passes through Edgmont, Newtown Square, Broomall, and Havertown. The route has an interchange with Interstate 476 (I-476) between Broomall and Havertown. Upon reaching Upper Darby, PA 3 heads into Philadelphia along Market Street. In Philadelphia, the route follows multiple one-way pairs, running along Chestnut Street eastbound and Walnut Street westbound in West Philadelphia before heading into Center City Philadelphia along Market Street eastbound and John F. Kennedy Boulevard westbound and ending at Philadelphia City Hall.

Philadelphia and West Chester were linked by a dirt road dating back to 1793. The Philadelphia and West Chester Turnpike Company was created to build a toll road between the two places in 1848. The turnpike was built as a plank road between Philadelphia and Newtown Square in the 1850s before becoming a stone road in the 1880s. A horse-drawn rail line was built along part of the turnpike in the 1850s and a trolley service was introduced in the 1890s. The state took over the West Chester Pike in 1918. In 1927, the route was designated as part of PA 5.

PA 3 replaced the PA 5 designation between West Chester and Philadelphia in 1937. Trolley service was replaced by buses in the 1950s to allow for the widening of PA 3 between West Chester and Philadelphia to four lanes. By 1960, PA 3 was shifted to end at US 13 in Southwest Philadelphia. The routing was shifted to US 13 west of University City by 1970 before the route was extended east to Philadelphia City Hall during the 1970s.

== Route description ==
=== Chester and Delaware counties ===
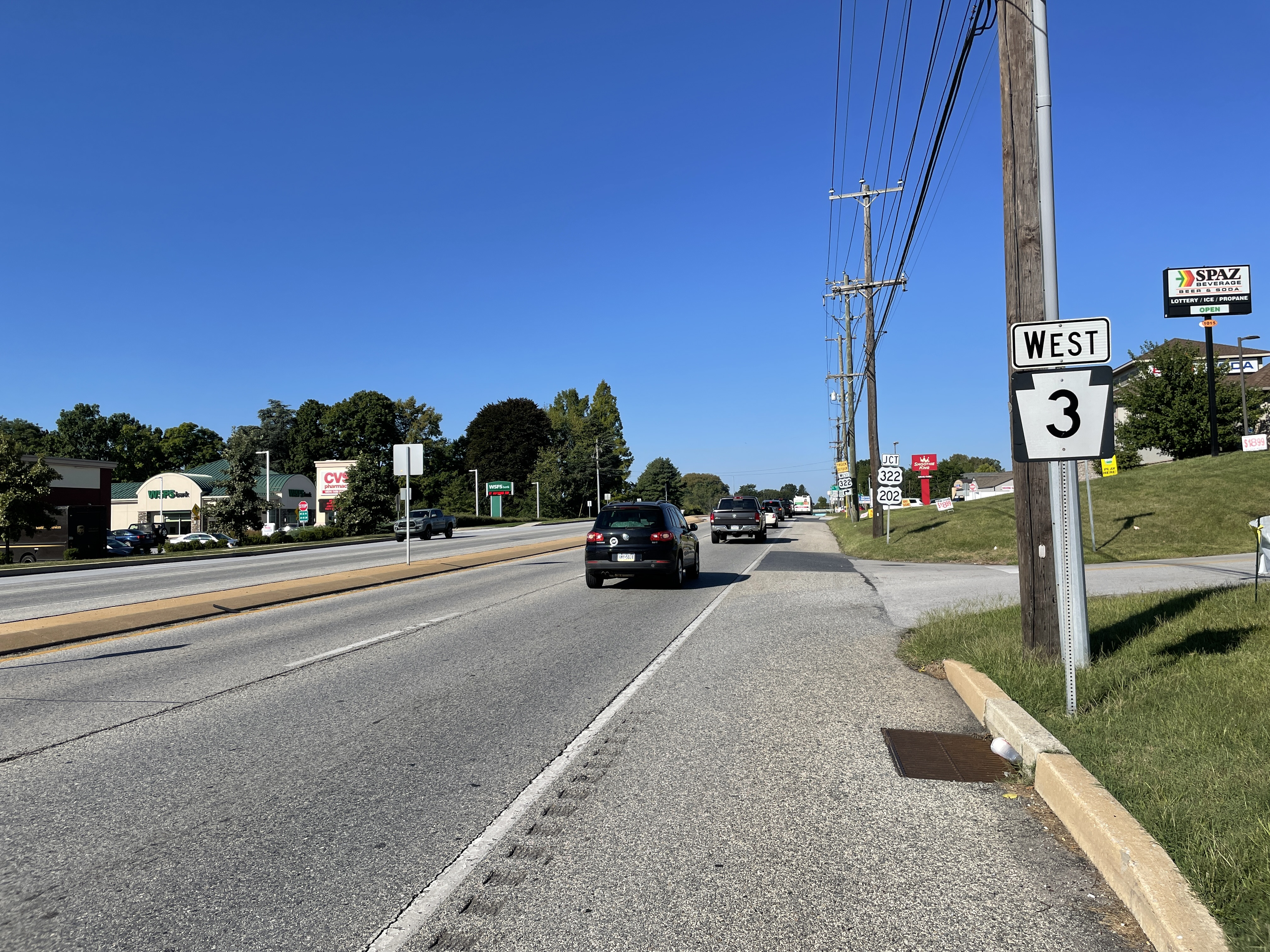
PA 3 westbound approaching US 202/US 322 in West Goshen Township

PA 3 begins at an intersection with US 322 Bus. (High Street) in the downtown area of the borough of West Chester in Chester County near the historic Chester County Courthouse. From here, the route heads northeast on the one-way pair of East Market Street eastbound and East Chestnut Street westbound. The one-way streets carry two lanes in each direction as they pass downtown businesses. At the intersection with Matlack Street, the westbound direction of PA 3 shifts from East Chestnut Street one block south to East Gay Street. The route continues to follow East Market Street eastbound and East Gay Street westbound through commercial areas, passing north of the terminus of the West Chester Railroad at the West Chester station along East Market Street. PA 3 leaves West Chester for West Goshen Township and intersects Montgomery Avenue (westbound only) and Garfield Avenue/Westtown Road before it comes to an eastbound exit and westbound entrance with Paoli Pike. At this point, both directions of the route join and head east along four-lane divided West Chester Pike, passing through residential areas in the community of Chatwood. PA 3 comes to a partial cloverleaf interchange with the US 202/US 322 freeway and runs past businesses and some homes. The road curves east-southeast at the Strasburg Road intersection and crosses into East Goshen Township, where it continues past suburban neighborhoods and commercial establishments, crossing the East Branch Chester Creek and passing through the community of Goshen. PA 3 enters Westtown Township and reaches an intersection with PA 352, forming a short concurrency with that route before PA 352 splits to the southeast. The road heads east through wooded areas with residential subdivisions as it continues into Willistown Township. The route intersects the eastern terminus of PA 926 and curves east-northeast through a mix of fields and woodland with some homes, crossing the Ridley Creek before coming to a junction with Delchester Road.

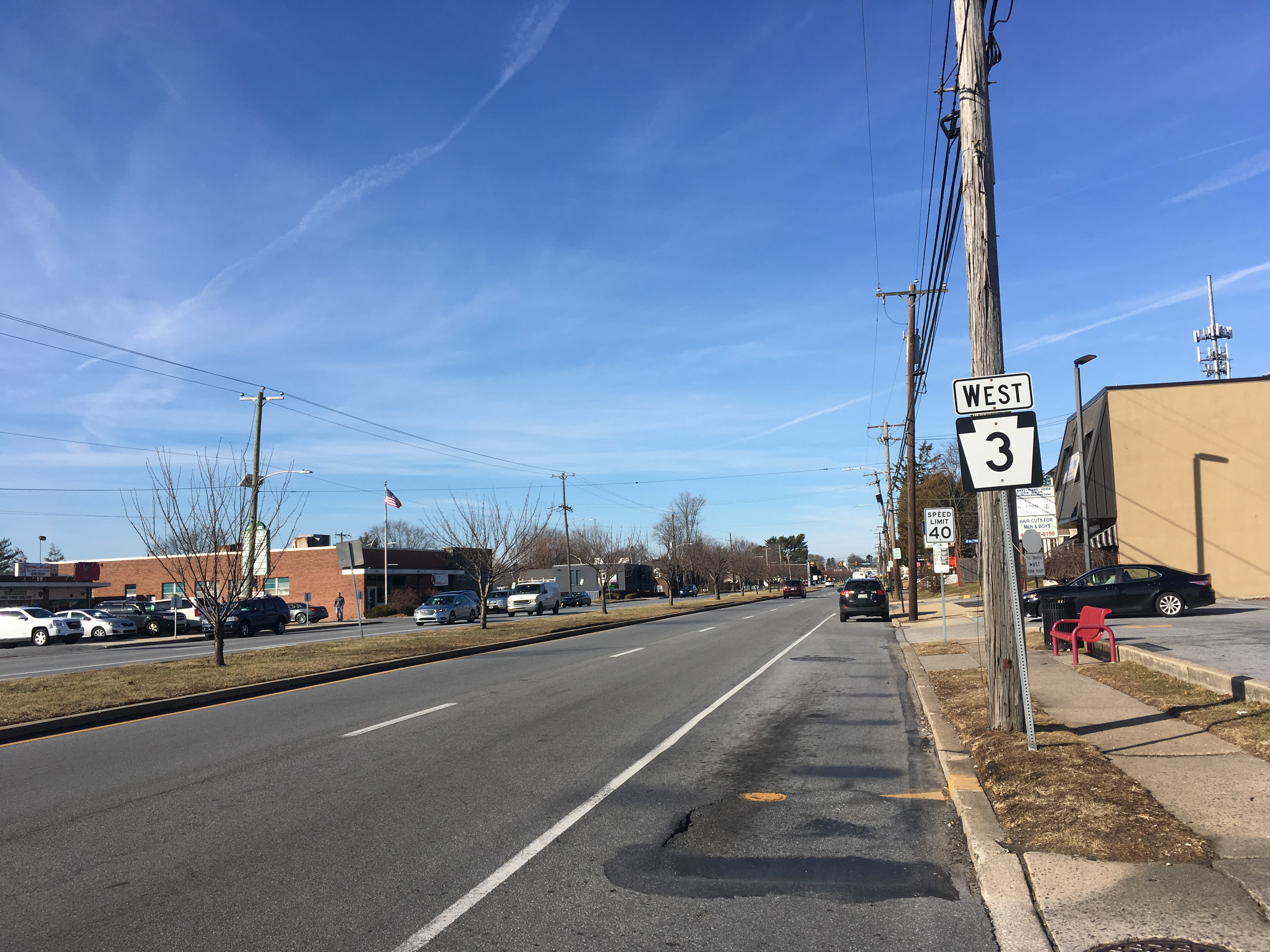
PA 3 westbound past PA 320 in Broomall

PA 3 enters Edgmont Township in Delaware County as it passes to the north of Ridley Creek State Park. The road continues east with some homes and businesses, intersecting Providence Road. After passing to the south of a shopping center, the route crosses Crum Creek into Newtown Township and heads south of the Delaware County Veterans Memorial, running past a mix of fields and development. PA 3 curves east at the Boot Road intersection and passes between a business campus that includes SAP's North America headquarters to the north and a residential neighborhood to the south. The road heads into business areas and reaches intersections with Bishop Hollow Road and PA 252 in the community of Newtown Square. Following the PA 252 intersection, the route continues east through a mix of suburban residential and commercial areas. At the Media Line Road junction, PA 3 crosses into Marple Township and soon intersects Springfield Road. The road passes more homes and businesses and comes to a junction with PA 320 in the community of Broomall. The route continues near suburban neighborhoods with some businesses before it reaches a partial cloverleaf interchange with I-476.

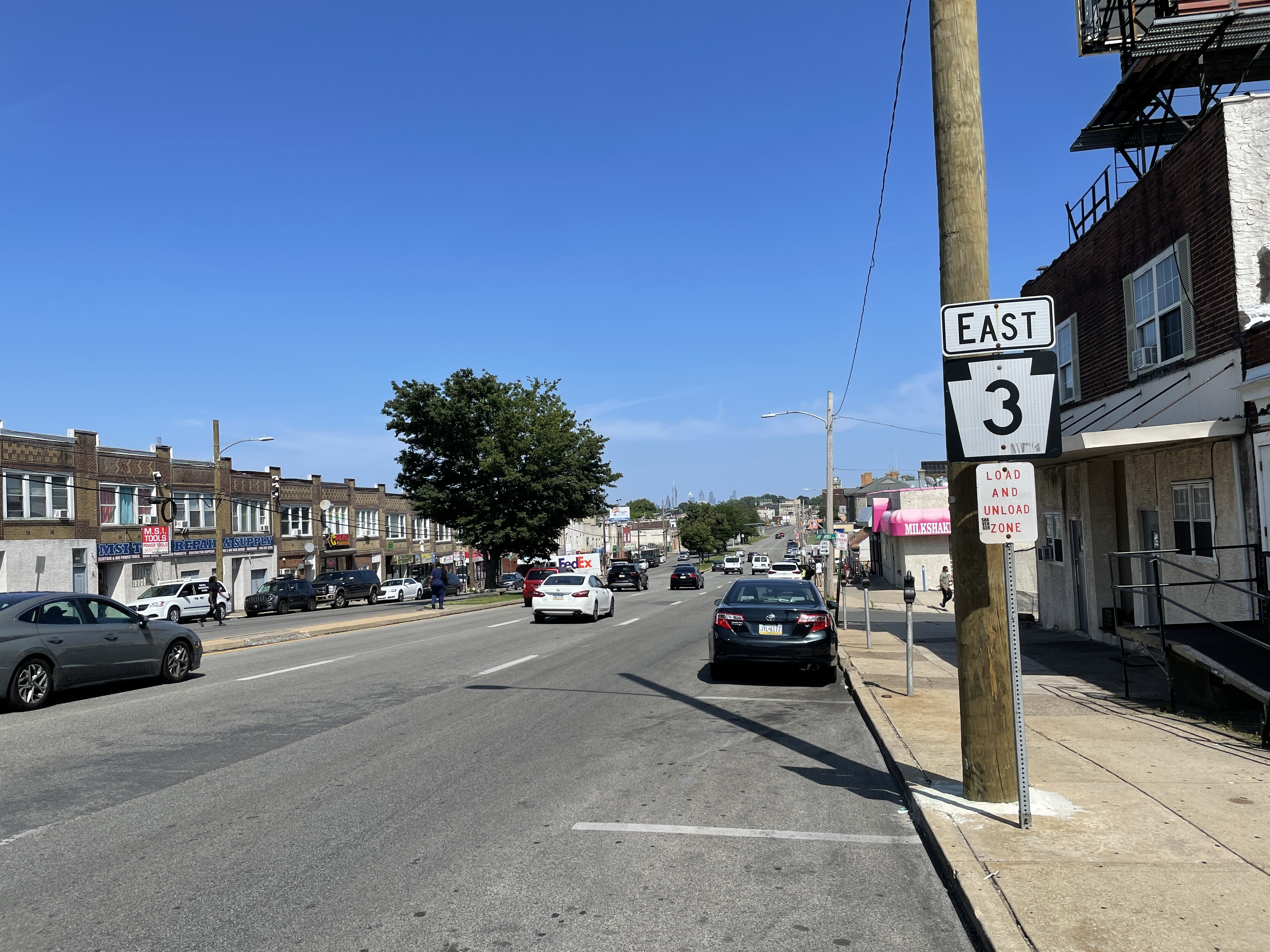
PA 3 eastbound in Upper Darby, with the Philadelphia skyline in the distance

Past the I-476 interchange, PA 3 intersects Lawrence Road and crosses the Darby Creek into Haverford Township, where another section of Lawrence Road splits to the north. The road continues east past homes and businesses as it passes through the community of Havertown, reaching a junction with Eagle Road. PA 3 has an intersection with Manoa Road as it passes to the north of the Llanerch Country Club, continuing through suburban development. Farther east, the route crosses Naylors Run and heads into the community of Llanerch, where it intersects Darby Road a short distance before coming to a junction with US 1. After crossing US 1, PA 3 enters Upper Darby Township and continues past suburban businesses and homes. The road crosses State Road and heads into more urban areas of residential and commercial development. A set of SEPTA trolley tracks begins running in the median before the route comes to Terminal Square, where it crosses SEPTA's Media–Sharon Hill Line at-grade and intersects Victory Avenue/Garrett Road. Past this, PA 3 heads east on four-lane undivided Market Street as it passes between SEPTA's 69th Street Transportation Center to the north and urban businesses to the south, gaining a median before the 69th Street intersection. The route becomes undivided again and runs past more commercial development, forming the border between the borough of Millbourne to the north and Upper Darby Township to the south. PA 3 heads past some homes before turning into a divided highway at the eastern edge of Millbourne as SEPTA's Market–Frankford Line rises to pass over the road.

=== West Philadelphia ===
PA 3 one-way pair in West Philadelphia

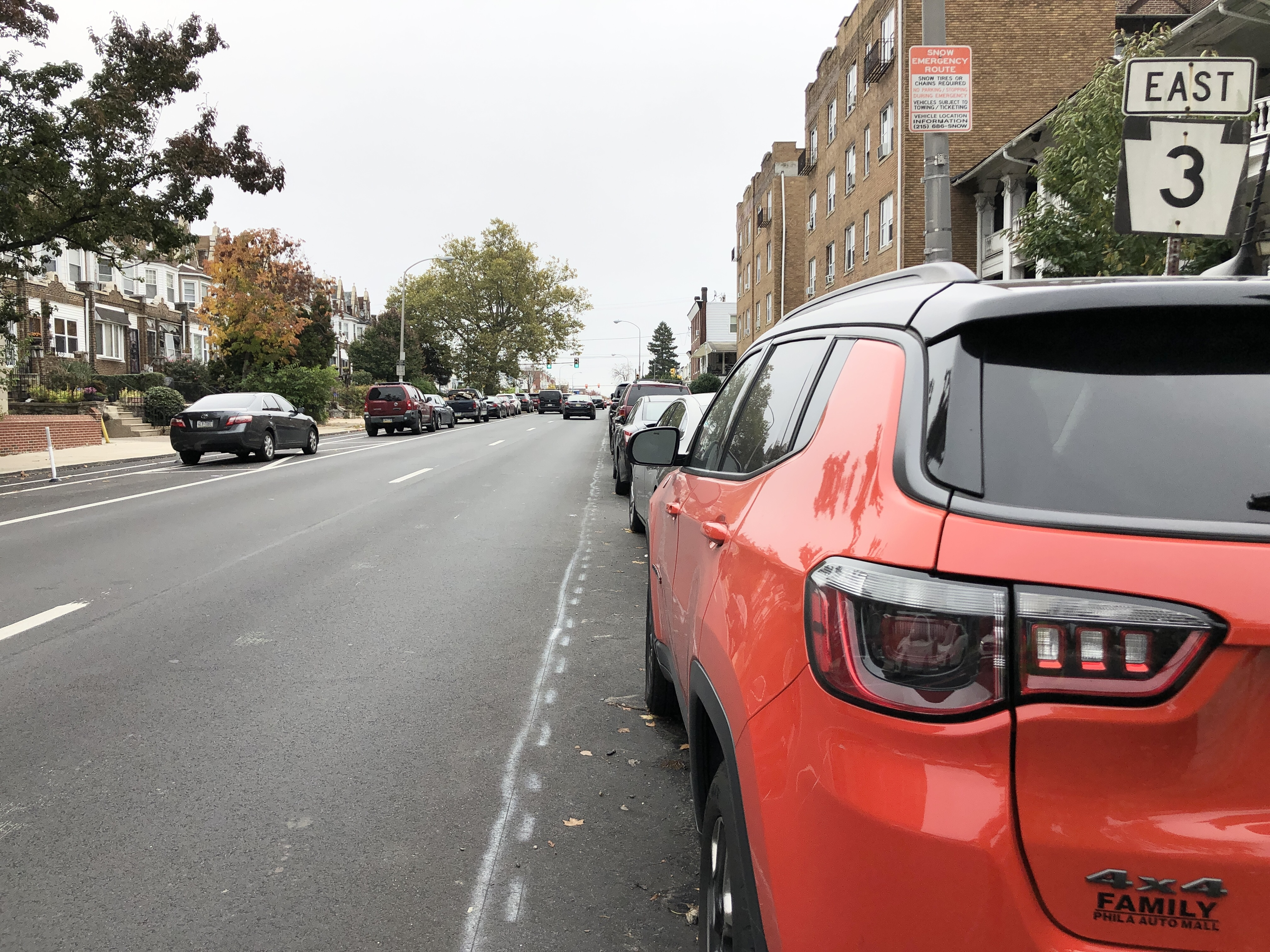
Eastbound on Chestnut Street

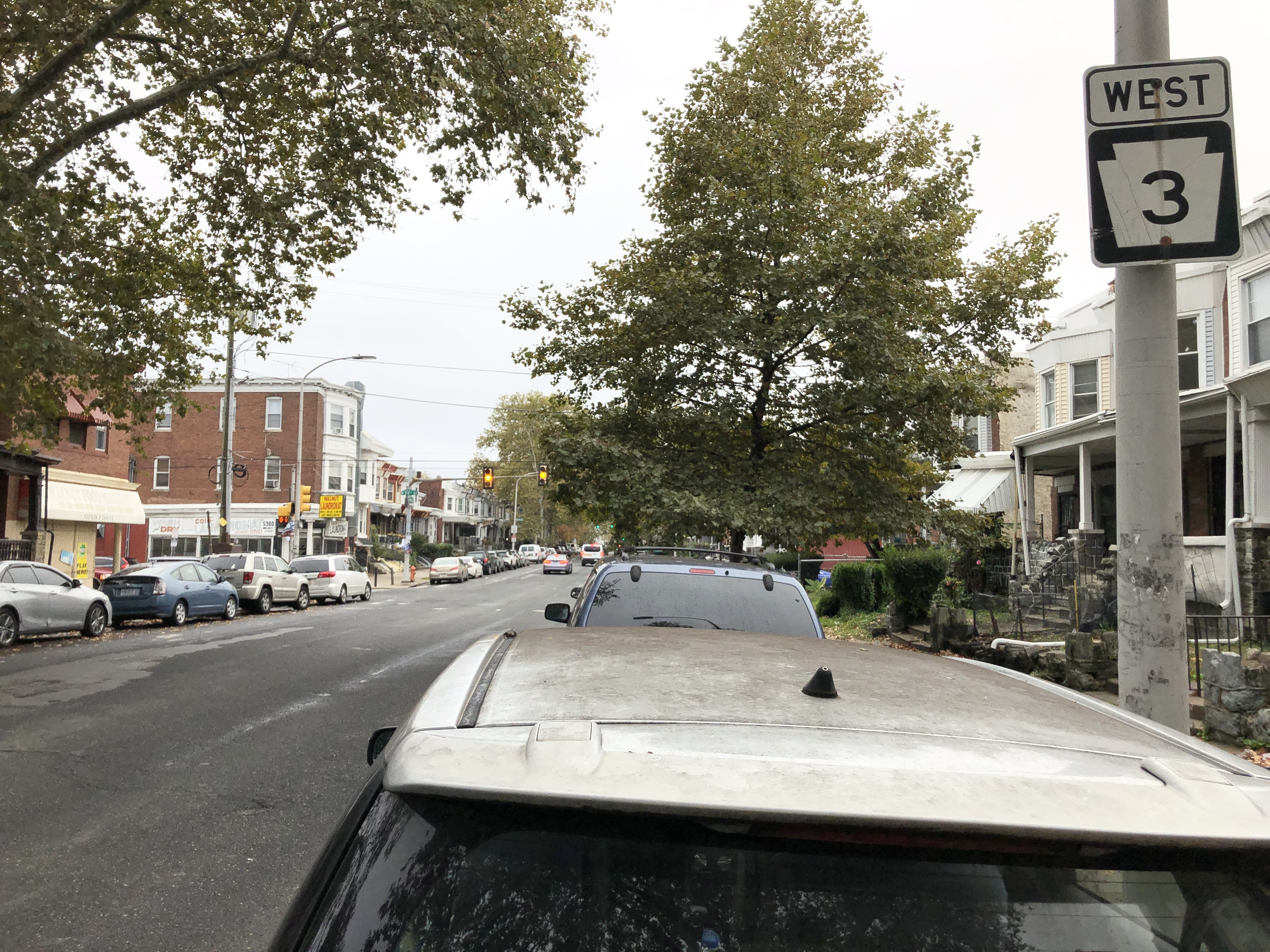
Westbound on Walnut Street

PA 3 crosses the Cobbs Creek into the city of Philadelphia in Philadelphia County, where it immediately splits from Market Street by turning south onto Cobbs Creek Parkway at the 63rd Street station on the Market–Frankford Line. The route follows four-lane undivided Cobbs Creek Parkway between woods along the creek to the west and urban development to the east before it splits east onto a one-way pair. The eastbound direction of PA 3 follows Chestnut Street while the westbound direction of PA 3 follows Walnut Street a block to the south. Chestnut Street carries three lanes of one-way eastbound traffic while Walnut Street carries two lanes of one-way westbound traffic. PA 3 follows Chestnut and Walnut street east through residential areas of West Philadelphia, passing several blocks of rowhouses with some businesses. Walnut Street passes to the north of William L. Sayre High School between 59th and 58th streets while Chestnut Street passes south of West Philadelphia High School before crossing 49th Street, south of the Community College of Philadelphia's West Regional Center past 48th Street, and south of West Catholic Preparatory High School prior to crossing 45th Street. Farther east, the route reaches the University City neighborhood of Philadelphia, where Walnut Street runs along the edge of the University of Pennsylvania campus. The streets cross a SEPTA trolley track at 40th Street. Upon reaching US 13, westbound PA 3 shifts from Walnut Street to Market Street, running concurrent with US 13 southbound on four-lane divided 38th Street between Market and Walnut streets; 38th Street carries a SEPTA trolley track in the northbound direction. East of US 13, westbound PA 3 follows on Market Street, a three-lane road with a center left-turn lane. At this point, SEPTA's Market–Frankford Line runs underneath Market Street, with SEPTA's Subway–Surface Trolley Lines joining at 36th Street. Eastbound PA 3 continues east on one-way Chestnut Street. The route passes several multistory commercial buildings as it runs through the northern part of the Drexel University campus. At 33rd Street, eastbound PA 3 turns north and joins the westbound direction on Market Street, continuing east.

Upon reaching 32nd Street, PA 3 splits into another one-way pair, with eastbound PA 3 continuing east along Market Street and westbound PA 3 following four-lane John F. Kennedy Boulevard, both being two-way streets. The route passes under CSX's Harrisburg Subdivision railroad line before coming to the 30th Street intersection at 30th Street Station, which serves Amtrak's Northeast Corridor railroad line, the SEPTA Regional Rail system, and NJ Transit's Atlantic City Line. The eastbound direction passes to the south of the train station and north of the city's former main Post Office facility as a four-lane undivided street. The westbound direction bends north around the train station, running along a one-way street with two lanes of traffic that heads north on Schuykill Avenue and crosses under the SEPTA tracks before turning west on Arch Street. It then passes to the south of the Cira Centre and curves south as 30th Street under the SEPTA tracks again before turning west on John F. Kennedy Boulevard. Immediately east of 30th Street Station, PA 3 has an interchange with I-76 (Schuylkill Expressway) before it crosses over the Schuylkill River and then the Schuylkill River Trail and CSX's Philadelphia Subdivision railroad line on the river's east bank on the Market Street Bridge eastbound and the John F. Kennedy Boulevard Bridge westbound.

=== Center City Philadelphia ===
PA 3 one-way pair in Center City

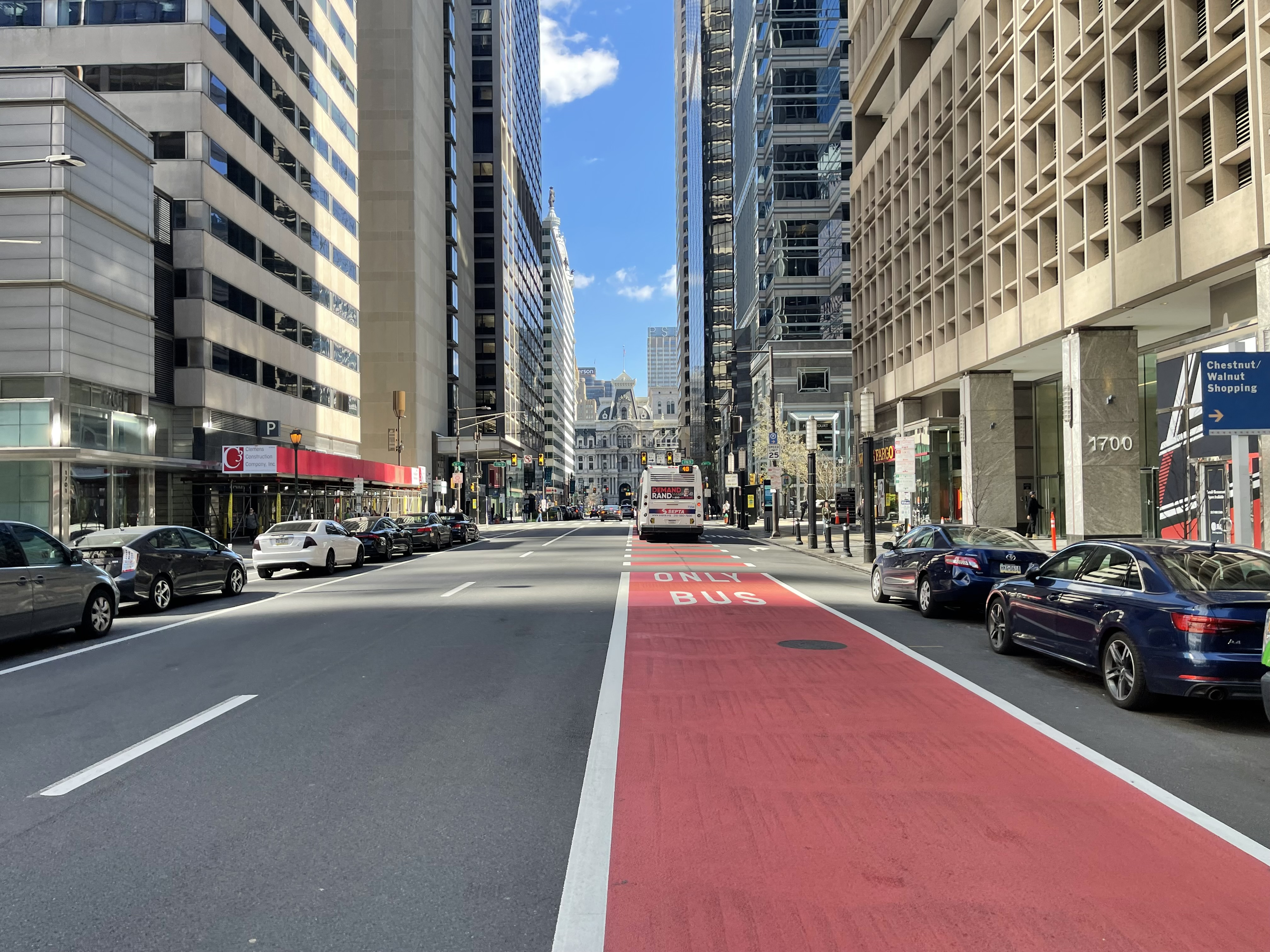
Eastbound on Market Street

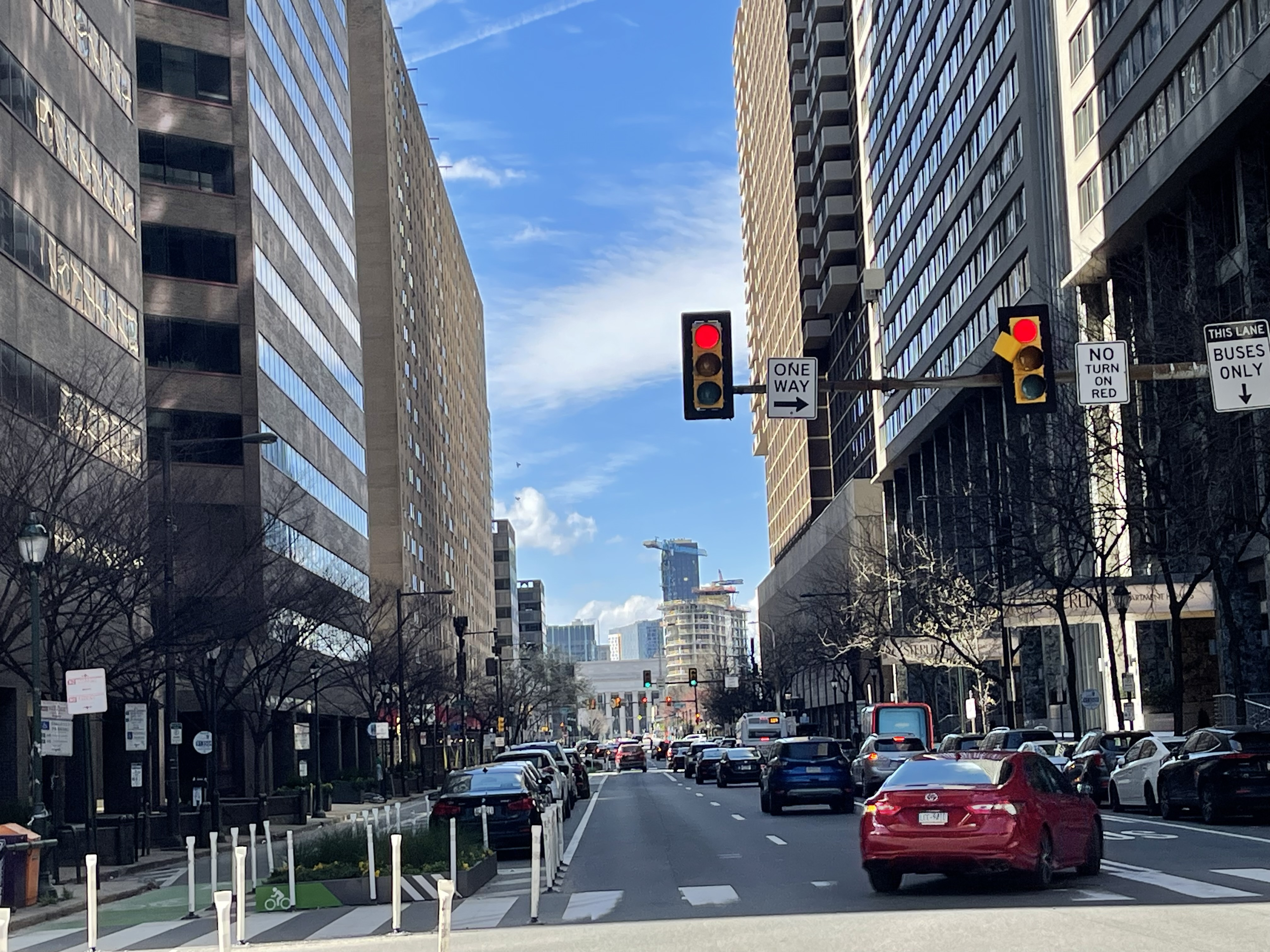
Westbound on John F. Kennedy Boulevard

At this point, PA 3 heads into Center City Philadelphia on four-lane undivided Market Street eastbound and four-lane divided John F. Kennedy Boulevard westbound. The streets pass several downtown skyscrapers, with the westbound direction running south of SEPTA's Main Line tracks, which head into the Center City Commuter Connection tunnel at 20th Street. At the 20th Street intersection, both directions of PA 3 become one-way streets, with Market Street carrying three lanes of eastbound traffic, with the fourth right-most lane serving as a bus lane, and John F. Kennedy Boulevard carrying four lanes of westbound traffic as it heads into the Penn Center business district. At the 19th Street intersection, the right-most lane on John F. Kennedy Boulevard becomes a bus lane. Eastbound PA 3 passes to the north of Liberty Place between 17th and 16th streets while westbound PA 3 passes to the south of the Comcast Center between 18th and 17th streets, Suburban Station of SEPTA Regional Rail between 17th and 16th streets, and LOVE Park between 16th and 15th streets. PA 3 reaches its eastern terminus at PA 611 (which runs north-south along Broad Street through Philadelphia) at 15th Street, which forms the western part of Penn Square around Philadelphia City Hall.

== History ==
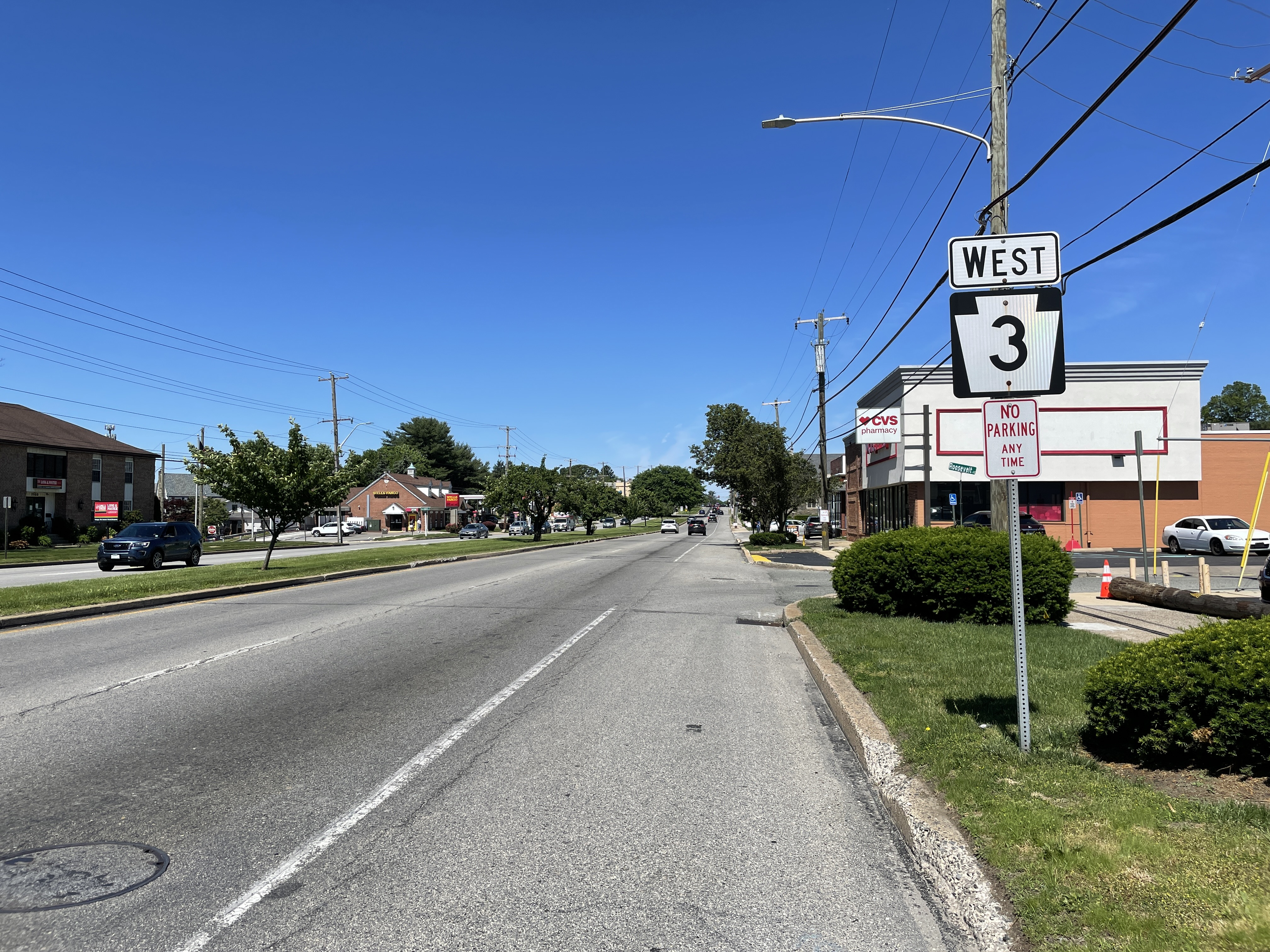
PA 3 westbound in Havertown

From 1793 to 1850, Philadelphia and West Chester were linked by a dirt road used by horse-drawn carriages and wagons. The Philadelphia and West Chester Turnpike Road Company was formed in March 1848 to build a turnpike between 38th and Market streets in Philadelphia and Newtown Square. The turnpike was to have five toll houses along its length. The West Chester Pike was constructed to improve farming and manufacturing in Delaware County. The turnpike became a plank road between 1850 and 1868. Rail service was first used on the turnpike in 1859, when the Delaware County Passenger Rail Road Company built a 4-mile (6.4 km) horse-drawn rail line from 38th and Market streets in Philadelphia to Howard House in Upper Darby. The entire turnpike between Philadelphia and Newtown Square became a stone road by 1885. The Philadelphia and West Chester Traction Company established a trolley service along the West Chester Pike between 63rd Street in Philadelphia and Newtown Square in 1895. Steam dummies were first used but electric trolley cars were introduced a year later. The trolley line was extended west to West Chester in 1898. The trolley line followed the south side of the turnpike. Following the construction of 69th Street Terminal in Upper Darby in 1907, the route of the West Chester Pike saw increasing suburban development. In 1918, the West Chester Pike was taken over by the state, with the tolls removed.

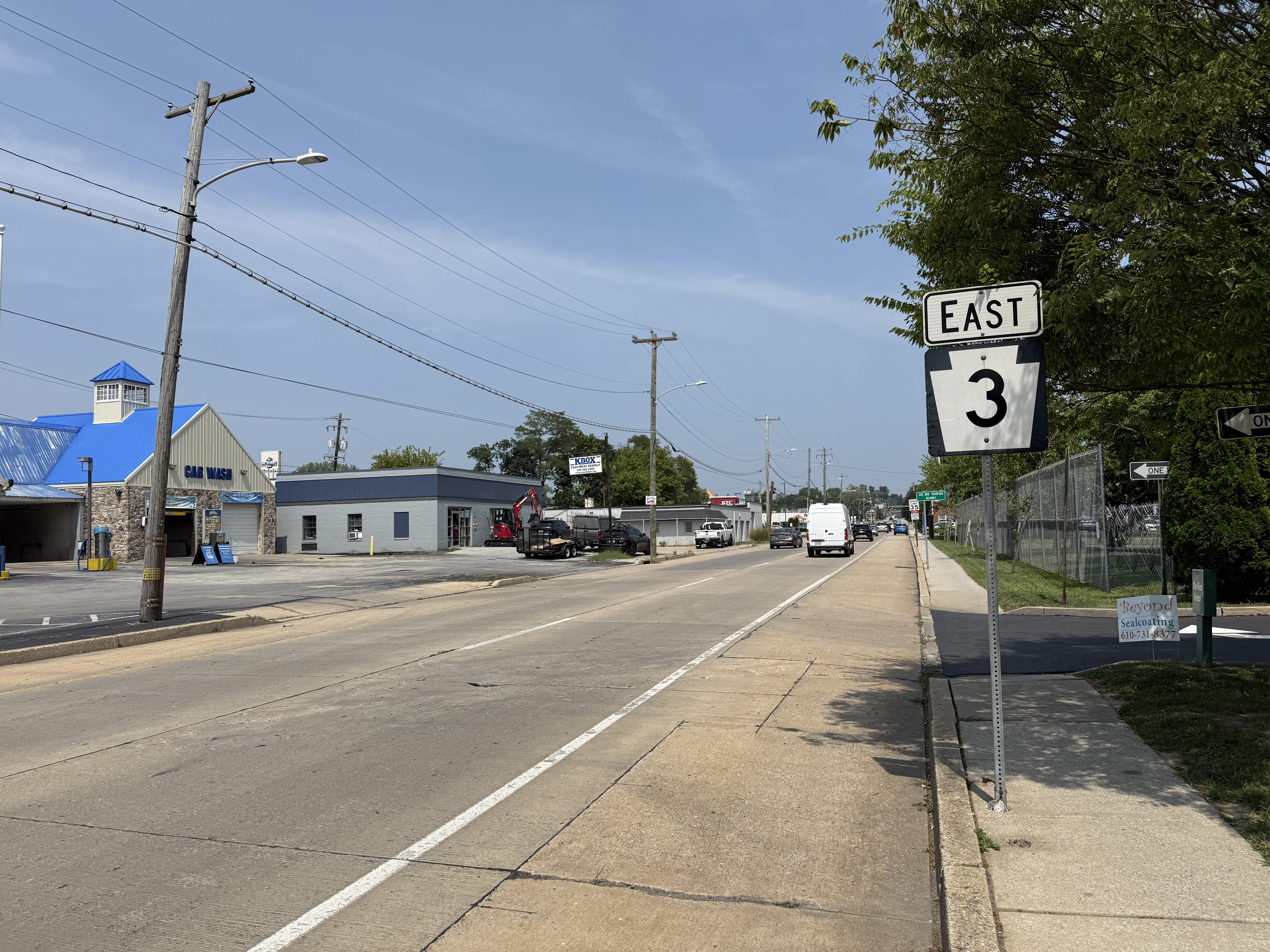
PA 3 eastbound on Market Street in West Chester

The West Chester Pike was designated as Legislative Route 133 when the Sproul Road Bill was passed in 1911. In 1927, the West Chester Pike and Market Street in Philadelphia were designated as part of PA 5, which ran along the Lakes-to-Sea Highway. Between downtown West Chester and Paoli Pike, PA 5 had a concurrency with US 122/PA 52 (later US 202) along Gay Street. In 1937, PA 3 was commissioned between US 202/US 322/PA 100 (now US 322 Bus.) in West Chester and US 30 in Philadelphia, replacing the previous PA 5 designation. In Philadelphia, PA 3 was shifted by 1940 to follow Chestnut and Walnut streets east before turning north on 5th and 6th streets to meet US 30 at the approach to the Benjamin Franklin Bridge over the Delaware River.

The John F. Kennedy Boulevard section of PA 3 was originally part of Filbert Street. The stretch of land between Market Street and Filbert Street once contained a viaduct carrying several tracks of the Pennsylvania Railroad that led to Broad Street Station. The viaduct provided a physical and social barrier between areas north and south of Market Street that came to be known as the "Chinese Wall." In 1930, the Pennsylvania Railroad opened Suburban Station, with a new bridge over the Schuylkill River and railroad line parallel to the "Chinese Wall" leading to the new station. With the opening of the Suburban Station, the Pennsylvania Railroad planned to close Broad Street Station and demolish the "Chinese Wall", replacing it with a wide street called Pennsylvania Boulevard that would contain several office buildings. However, the Great Depression put these plans on hold and Broad Street Station and the "Chinese Wall" would continue to be used until 1952. The station and viaduct were demolished and Pennsylvania Boulevard was constructed in the 1950s, with the Penn Center business district built along the boulevard. As part of constructing the boulevard, a new bridge was built over the Schuylkill River leading to 30th Street Station. Pennsylvania Boulevard was later renamed to John F. Kennedy Boulevard.

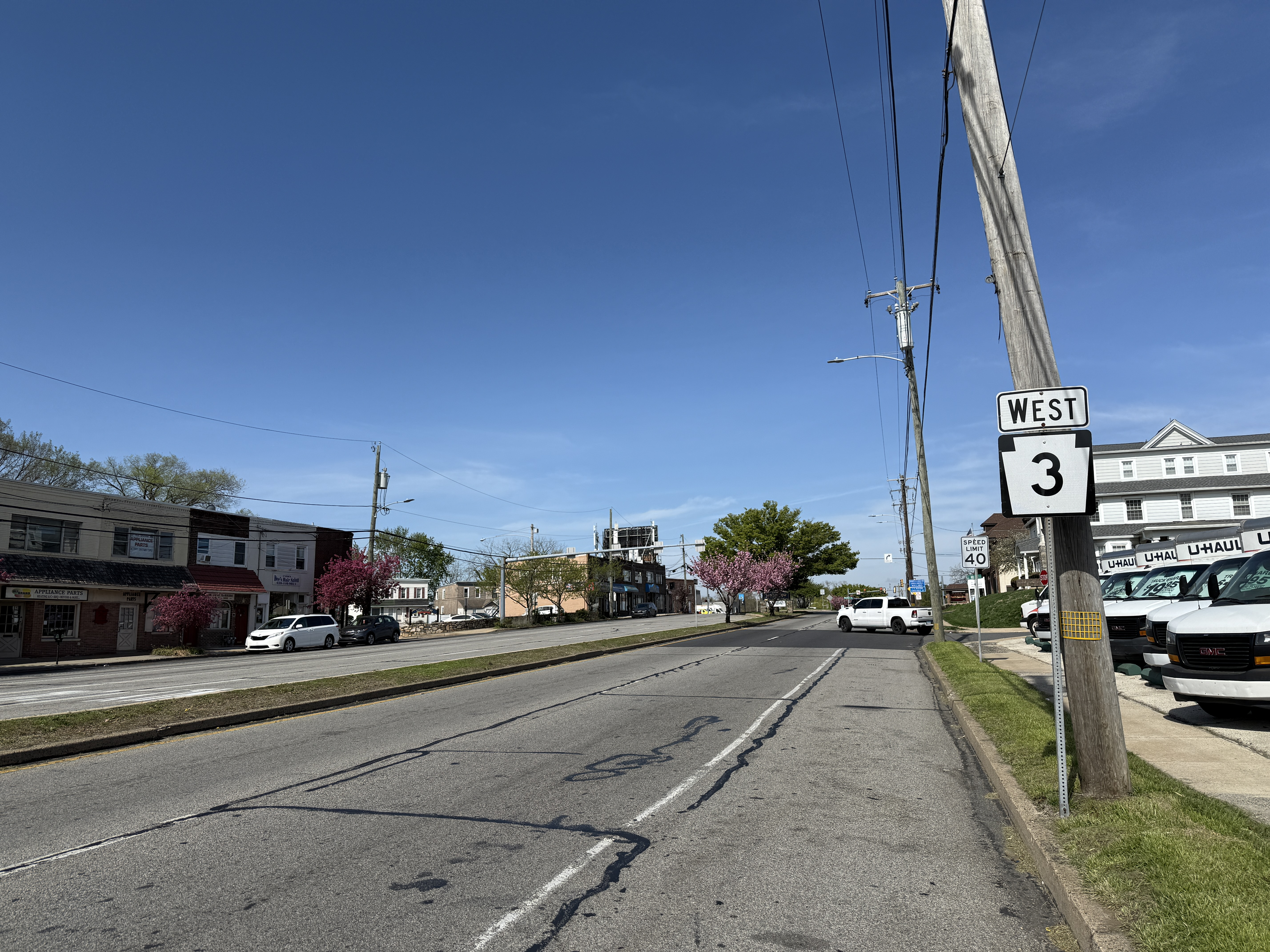
PA 3 westbound past US 1 in Havertown

In 1954, regular trolley service between Philadelphia and West Chester ended as plans were made to widen PA 3. Trolley service during peak periods continued until 1958. The trolley service was replaced by buses, which is today part of SEPTA's Route 104 service. During the mid 1950s and early 1960s, the West Chester Pike portion of PA 3 was widened into a four-lane road. US 202 and PA 3 were routed onto a one-way pair in West Chester along Market and Gay streets by 1959. By 1960, PA 3 was rerouted to follow Cobbs Creek Parkway and Baltimore Avenue to end at US 13 at the intersection of Baltimore and Whitby avenues in Southwest Philadelphia. The route was realigned to follow Chestnut and Walnut streets to US 13 at 44th and 43rd streets by 1970. Also by this time, the US 202 concurrency in West Chester was removed as that highway was rerouted to bypass the borough to the east along US 322. PA 3 was extended east to PA 291 and PA 611 at Philadelphia City Hall during the 1970s. The route followed Chestnut and Walnut streets to US 13 at 38th Street before running along Chestnut Street eastbound and Market Street westbound to 30th Street Station, where it shifted to Market Street eastbound and John F. Kennedy Boulevard westbound.

In 2012, the section of PA 3 between Adams Street in West Chester and US 202/US 322 in West Goshen Township was named the Robert J. Thompson Highway in honor of former State Senator Robert J. Thompson. A ceremony was held on October 9, 2012, with State Senator Andy Dinniman and state and local officials in attendance.

On August 16, 2021, the right lane on eastbound PA 3 (Market Street) between 20th Street and PA 611 (15th Street) and on westbound PA 3 (John F. Kennedy Boulevard) between PA 611 (15th Street) and 19th Street was converted into a bus lane as part of a pilot project to add bus lanes to streets in Philadelphia to improve public transportation.

== Major intersections ==
County	Location	mi	km	Destinations	Notes
Chester	West Chester	0.000	0.000	US 322 Bus. west (Chestnut Street)	Continuation west
Chester	West Chester	0.000	0.000	US 322 Bus. east (North High Street)	
Chester	West Goshen Township	0.805	1.296	Paoli Pike	Interchange; eastbound exit and westbound entrance
Chester	West Goshen Township	1.338	2.153	US 202 / US 322 – King of Prussia, Downingtown, Wilmington, Chester	Interchange
Chester	Westtown Township	4.518	7.271	PA 352 north (North Chester Road) – Frazer	Western end of PA 352 concurrency
Chester	Westtown Township	4.648	7.480	PA 352 south – Lima	Eastern end of PA 352 concurrency
Chester	Willistown Township	6.338	10.200	PA 926 west (Street Road) – Cheyney, Westtown	Eastern terminus of PA 926
Delaware	Newtown Township	11.308	18.198	PA 252 (Newtown Street Road) – Paoli, Media	
Delaware	Marple Township	13.456	21.655	PA 320 (Sproul Road) – Villanova, Swarthmore	
Delaware	Marple Township	14.560	23.432	I-476 – Plymouth Meeting, Chester	Exit 9 on I-476
Delaware	Haverford–Upper Darby township line	17.117	27.547	US 1 (Township Line Road)	
Philadelphia	Philadelphia	22.451	36.131	US 13 (38th Street)	Brief concurrency westbound
Philadelphia	Philadelphia	23.321	37.532	I-76 to I-95 / I-676 east – Valley Forge, Central Philadelphia, International Airport	Exit 345 on I-76; former I-676
Philadelphia	Philadelphia	24.326	39.149	PA 611 (15th Street)	Penn Square; eastern terminus
1.000 mi = 1.609 km; 1.000 km = 0.621 mi: Concurrency terminus; Incomplete access
