= Estey Hall (Philadelphia) =

- U.S. National Register of Historic Places
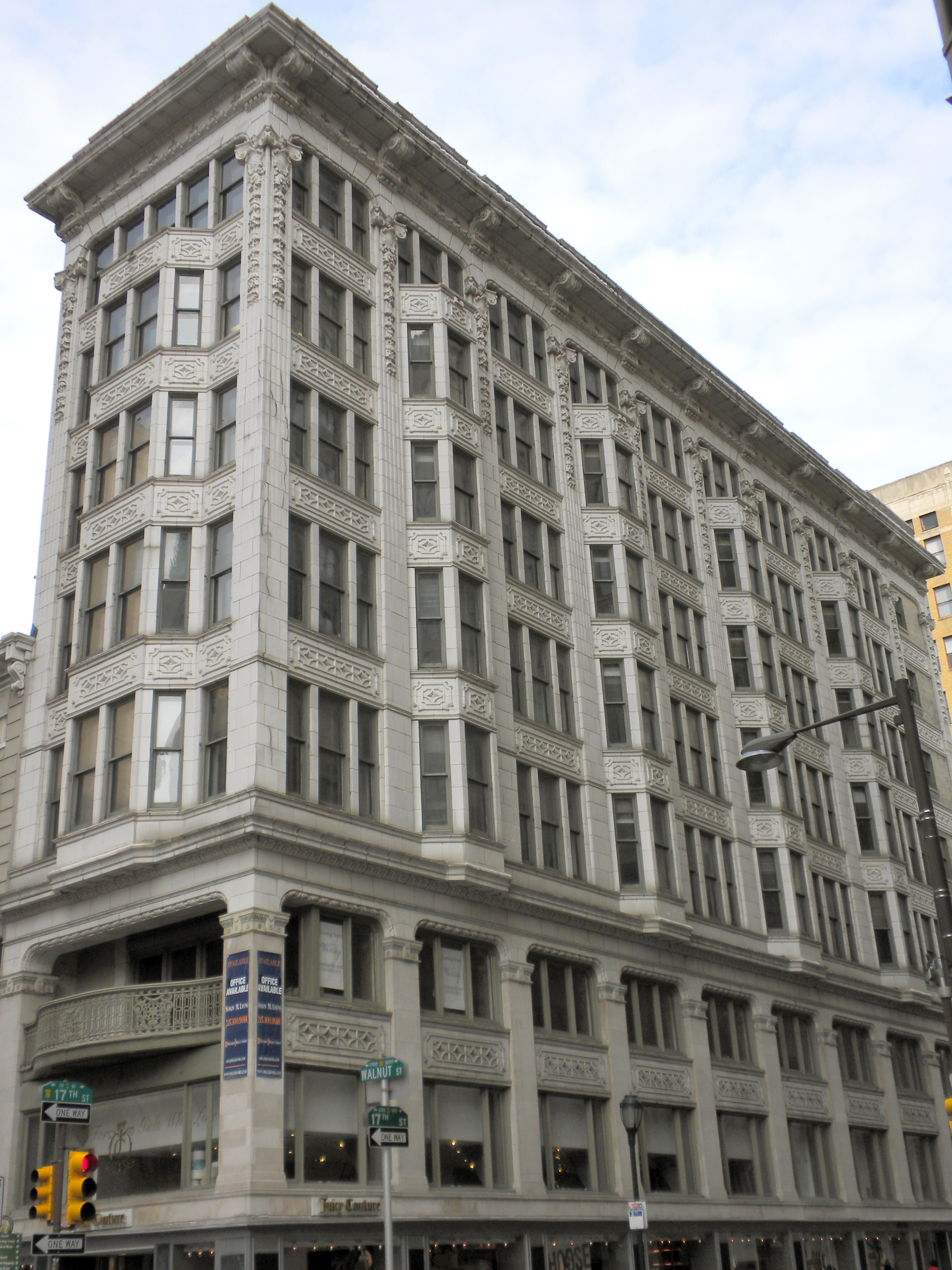
- Estey Hall in February 2010

- Location within Philadelphia Location within Pennsylvania Location within the United States
- Location: 1701 Walnut St., Philadelphia, Pennsylvania
- Coordinates: 39.95011°N 75.16919°W
- Area: 1 acre (4,000 m^{2})
- Built: 1910
- Architect: Baker & Dallet
- Architectural style: Chicago
- NRHP reference No.: 83004244
- Added to NRHP: October 28, 1983

Estey Hall, also known as the Allman Building, is a historic building in Philadelphia, Pennsylvania.

Estey Hall is a seven-story, commercial building, designed by architects Baker and Dallet, erected by Herbert D. Allman in 1910–11. It was the site from 1911 to 1924 of the Estey Piano Company.

It was listed on the National Register of Historic Places in 1983.
