= Walnut Lake =

Walnut Lake may refer to:

== Lakes ==
- Walnut Lake in Desha County, Arkansas
- Walnut Lake in Lee County, Arkansas
- Walnut Lake (West Bloomfield Township, Michigan)
- Walnut Lake, in Faribault County, Minnesota

== Other ==
- Walnut Lake Road, part of Metropolitan Parkway, in Metro Detroit, Michigan
- Walnut Lake Township, Faribault County, Minnesota
