= Walnut Creek (Little Sac River tributary) =

Stream in the American state of Missouri

Walnut Creek is a stream in Polk County the Ozarks of southwest Missouri. It is a tributary of the Little Sac River.

The stream headwaters are located at 37°32′55″N 93°25′47″W and the confluence with the Little Sac River are at 37°31′32″N 93°31′46″W.

The stream source is just southwest of the community of Karlin south of Bolivar. The stream flows southwest and west to its junction with the Little Sac about one mile south of Stockton Lake.

Walnut Creek was so named due to the abundant walnut timber in the area.

== See also ==
- List of rivers of Missouri
