= Walnut Street Bridge (Philadelphia) =

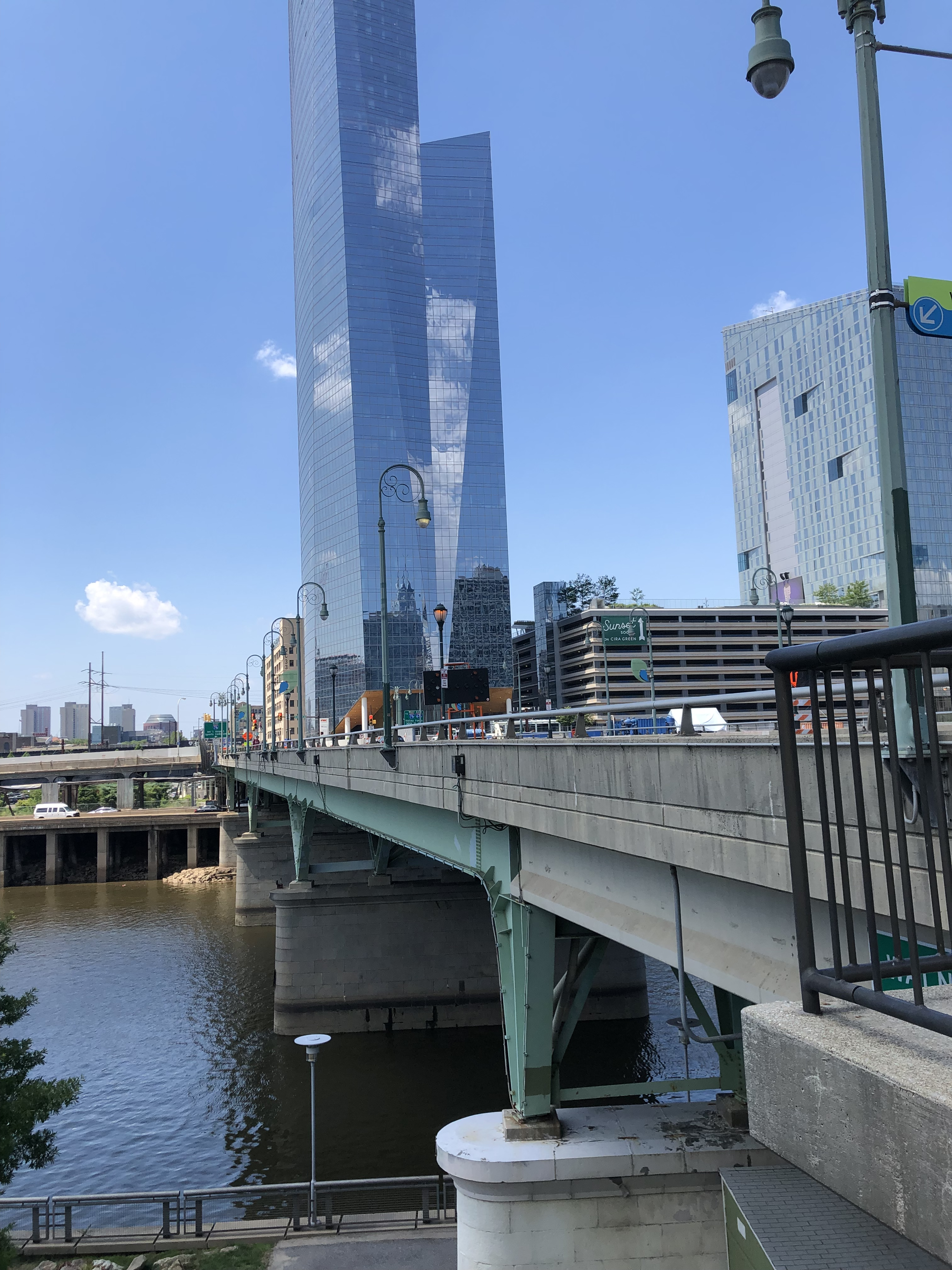
- Walnut Street Bridge with Cira Centre South and Center City Philadelphia in the background, July 2019
- Coordinates: 39.9515°N 75.1815°W
- Carries: Walnut Street
- Crosses: Schuylkill River
- Locale: Philadelphia, Pennsylvania, U.S.

Characteristics
- Width: 62 feet (19 m)

History
- Construction end: 1991

Location
- Interactive map of Walnut Street Bridge

Walnut Street Bridge, located in Philadelphia, Pennsylvania, crosses the Schuylkill River between Center City and West Philadelphia. The bridge carries Walnut Street across the Schuylkill River.

== History ==
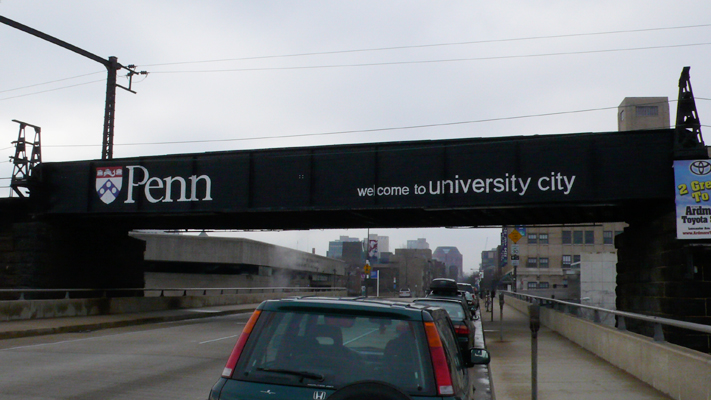
Walnut Street Bridge with its welcome sign in University City in West Philadelphia, December 2007

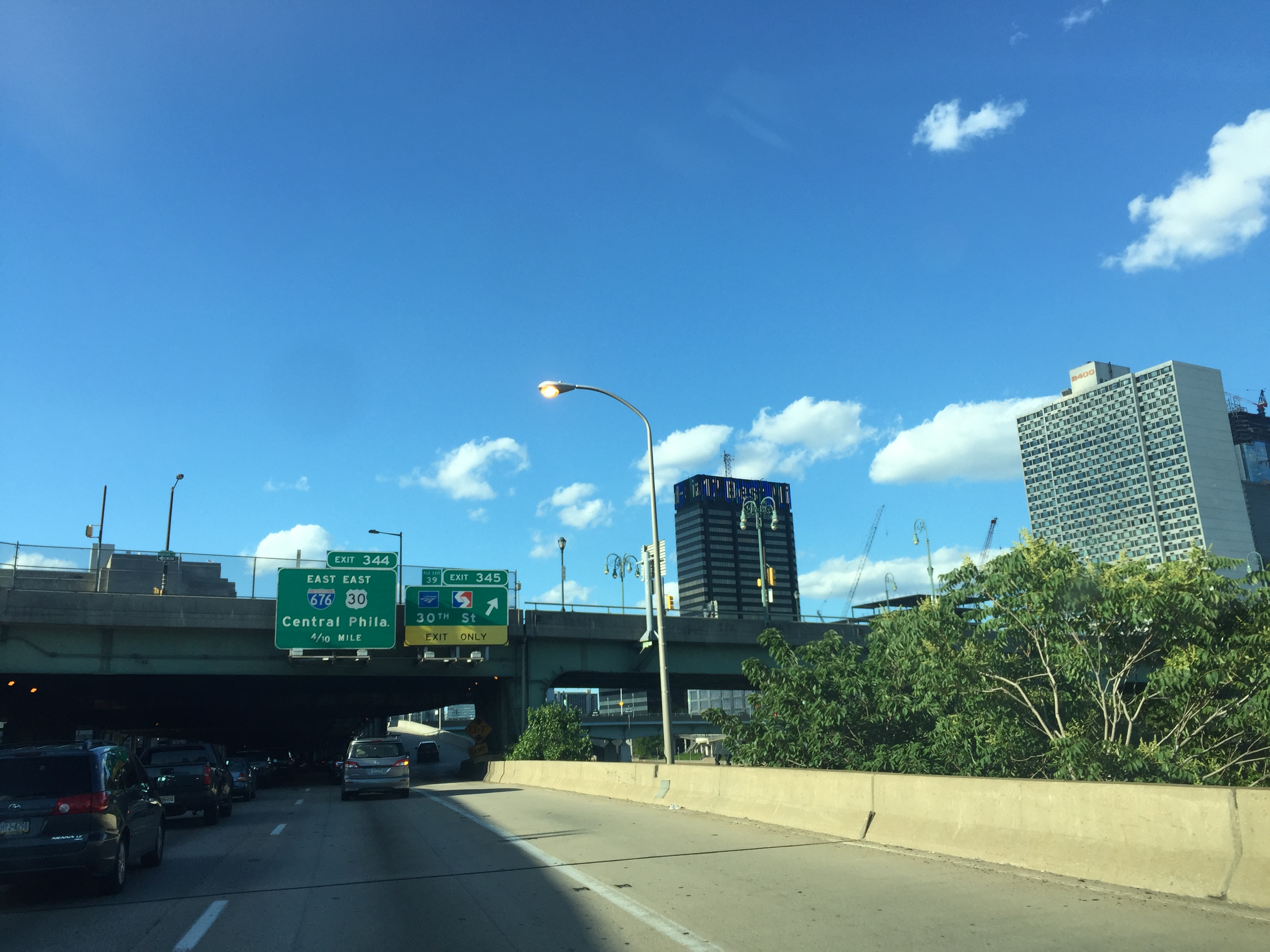
Walnut Street Bridge from I-76

Walnut Street Bridge was built originally in 1893. After falling into a state of disrepair in the late 20th century, it was rebuilt in 1990. In 2012, the bridge was adjusted again to become a 3-lane bridge with 12-feet-wide (3.7m) foot paths, and a bike lane.

The original 1893 bridge was a 60-foot-wide (18 m) concrete structure with three steel Pratt trusses mounted on four heavy oblong concrete abutments and piers. It was demolished in 1988, but its piers were used for the 62-foot (19 m)-wide 1991 span.

== See also ==
- List of crossings of the Schuylkill River
