= Walnut Creek (Animas Valley, New Mexico) =

Walnut Creek is a tributary stream of Animas Creek within Hidalgo County, New Mexico.

Its mouth is located at is confluence with Animas Creek, at an elevation of 5,029 feet (1,533 meters) in the Animas Valley. Its source is at 31°33′32″N 109°01′05″W at an elevation of 5,800 feet (1,800 meters) in the Peloncillo Mountains. It lies south of Herridge Draw and Skeleton Canyon and north of Whitmire Canyon.
