= Walnut sauce =

Walnut sauce may refer to:

- Salsa di noci, a traditional Italian cold condiment made with walnuts, garlic, olive oil, and dairy, often served with pasta.
- Satsivi, a Georgian poultry dish served with a walnut sauce, or the sauce itself.
- Tarator, a Balkan and Middle Eastern cold soup or sauce often made with walnuts.
- Circassian chicken, a Turkish and Levantine dish of boiled chicken in a walnut paste.
- Fesenjān, is a sweet and sour Iranian stew made with pomegranates and walnuts.
