= Walnut Creek (Raccoon River tributary) =

Stream in Iowa, U.S.

Coordinates: 41°34′04″N 93°40′34″W

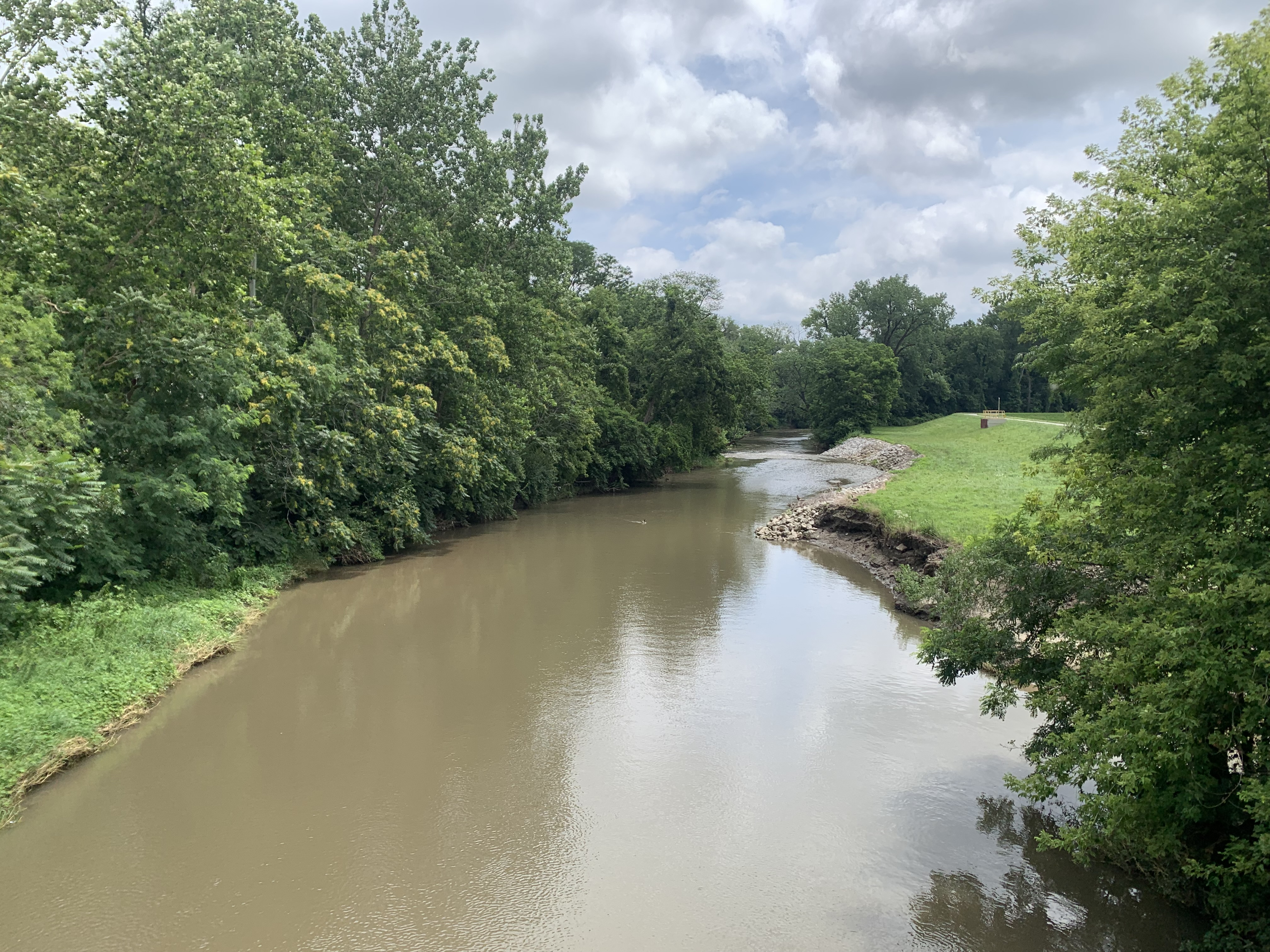
Walnut Creek at Muskogee Avenue bridge in western Des Moines, Iowa

Walnut Creek is a stream in Polk and Dallas counties, in the U.S. state of Iowa. It is a tributary of the Raccoon River.

== Location and activities ==
Walnut Creek is an easily perceivable stream that is beside the Des Moines River and alongside 63rd Street. There are parks and trails by the creek with activities that include birdwatching, biking, art, and swimming. The water is the main source of drinkable water for the metro area and it is located above the Des Moines Water Works.

== Environment ==
To solve concerns relating to the environment, a Watershed Management Authority was started to manage the creek and the watershed. The Walnut Creek Watershed Management Authority manages 53,000 acres (21,000 ha) in Dallas and Polk counties. The watershed authority has studied "nitrate, phosphorus, sediment, and pathogens" in the area. In July 2019, a fish kill was discovered along 2 miles (3.2 km) of the bottom of Walnut Creek and the Iowa Department of Natural Resources worked to investigate the cause after it was reported many times.

A 1979 environment impact report stated that flooding is common for Walnut Creek with high and brief peaks. A report was created in 1975 to determine how to protect Des Moines, Iowa, and West Des Moines, Iowa, from flooding by Raccoon River, Walnut Creek, and Jordan Creek. A major flood happened in 1973 and on May 10, 1986, the creek flooded and caused $6,300,000 in damage in Clive, Iowa. In 1986, a flood protection project was formed.

== Naming ==
Walnut Creek was named for the black walnut trees which once lined the creek before early settlers cleared them.

== See also ==
- List of rivers of Iowa
