= Walnut Creek (Oconee River tributary) =

Stream in Georgia, U.S.

Coordinates: 34°8′13.39″N 83°38′37.61″W

Walnut Creek is a stream in the U.S. state of Georgia. It is a tributary to the Middle Oconee River.

== History ==
Walnut Creek was named for the walnut trees native to the area.
