= Walnut Street (Philadelphia) =

Street in Philadelphia, Pennsylvania, USA

Coordinates: 39.951°N 75.181°W

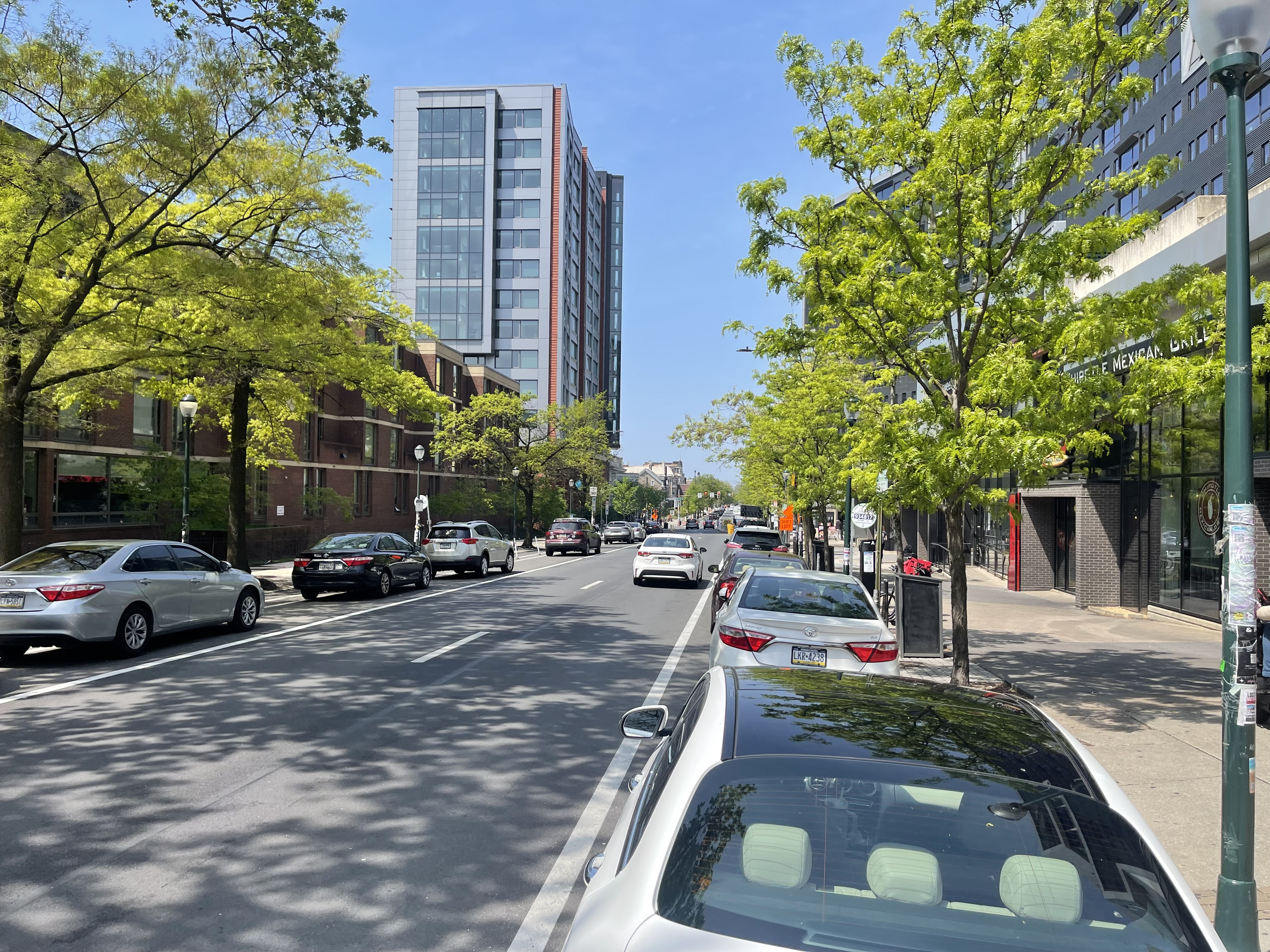
- Walnut Street in University City in front of University of Pennsylvania
- Interactive map of Walnut Street
- Maintained by: PennDOT and City of Philadelphia
- Length: 5.57 mi (8.96 km)
- Component highways: SR 3006 from Front Street to City Hall; PA 3 westbound between 38th and Cobbs Creek Parkway in Philadelphia
- Location: Philadelphia, Pennsylvania, U.S.
- West end: PA 3 (Cobbs Creek Parkway) in Cobbs Creek
- Major junctions: US 13 / PA 3 (38th Street) in University City; I-76 (Schuylkill Expressway) in University City; PA 611 (Broad Street) in Center City
- East end: Front Street in Penn's Landing
- North: Chestnut Street
- South: Locust Street

Walnut Street is located in Center City Philadelphia and extends to the Delaware River waterfront and West Philadelphia. Walnut Street has been characterized as "the city's premier shopping district" by The Philadelphia Inquirer.

A portion of the street commonly called Rittenhouse Row was ranked 12th in 2005 by Women's Wear Daily among its list of the most expensive retail streets in North America, with rents of $90 per square foot. The street is home to several "upscale dining, retail and cultural" establishments.

In 2013, rents rose to an average of $107 a foot, a growth of 34% over 2012 and the largest percentage growth of any retail corridor in the country.

== Route description ==
Walnut Street is most known for Rittenhouse Square Park and its upscale shopping district in the high-end neighborhood of the same name. The majority of designer and fast fashion stores located on Walnut Street are situated on a four-block stretch between Broad Street and 18th Street, which is anchored by the park on the southwest corner. This area of Walnut Street and a few blocks to the east features a variety of shops, eateries, bars, hotels, and office buildings.

Walnut Street Theatre, located at 825 Walnut Street, is the oldest continuously-operating theatre in the English-speaking world.

Among the many attractions and historic sites on Walnut Street are Independence National Historical Park and Society Hill on the east and Washington Square, Washington Square West, the St. James Hotel (1226-1232), the Philadelphia Stock Exchange (1419-1411), the Sun Oil Building (1608-1610), the 1616 Walnut Street Building, Rittenhouse Square, Estey Hall (1701 Walnut Street), and the Church of the Holy Trinity.

The Walnut Street Bridge, completed in 1949, crosses the Schuylkill River. On the west side of the river, the street crosses over the Schuylkill Expressway.

Further west, Walnut Street bisects the campus of the University of Pennsylvania, an Ivy League university founded in the mid-18th century by Benjamin Franklin in the University City section of West Philadelphia. At Walnut and 47th Streets is the site of the old West Philadelphia High School, and the Paul Robeson House is located at the corner of 50th and Walnut Streets.

The street continues westward through Walnut Hill, Dunlap, and eventually Cobbs Creek, where the it ends.

Running parallel to Walnut Street, one or two blocks to the north, depending on whether the side street Sansom Street is counted, is Chestnut Street. Pennsylvania Route 3 westbound follows Walnut Street from 38th Street (U.S. Route 13) to its western terminus at Cobbs Creek Parkway.

== Gallery ==
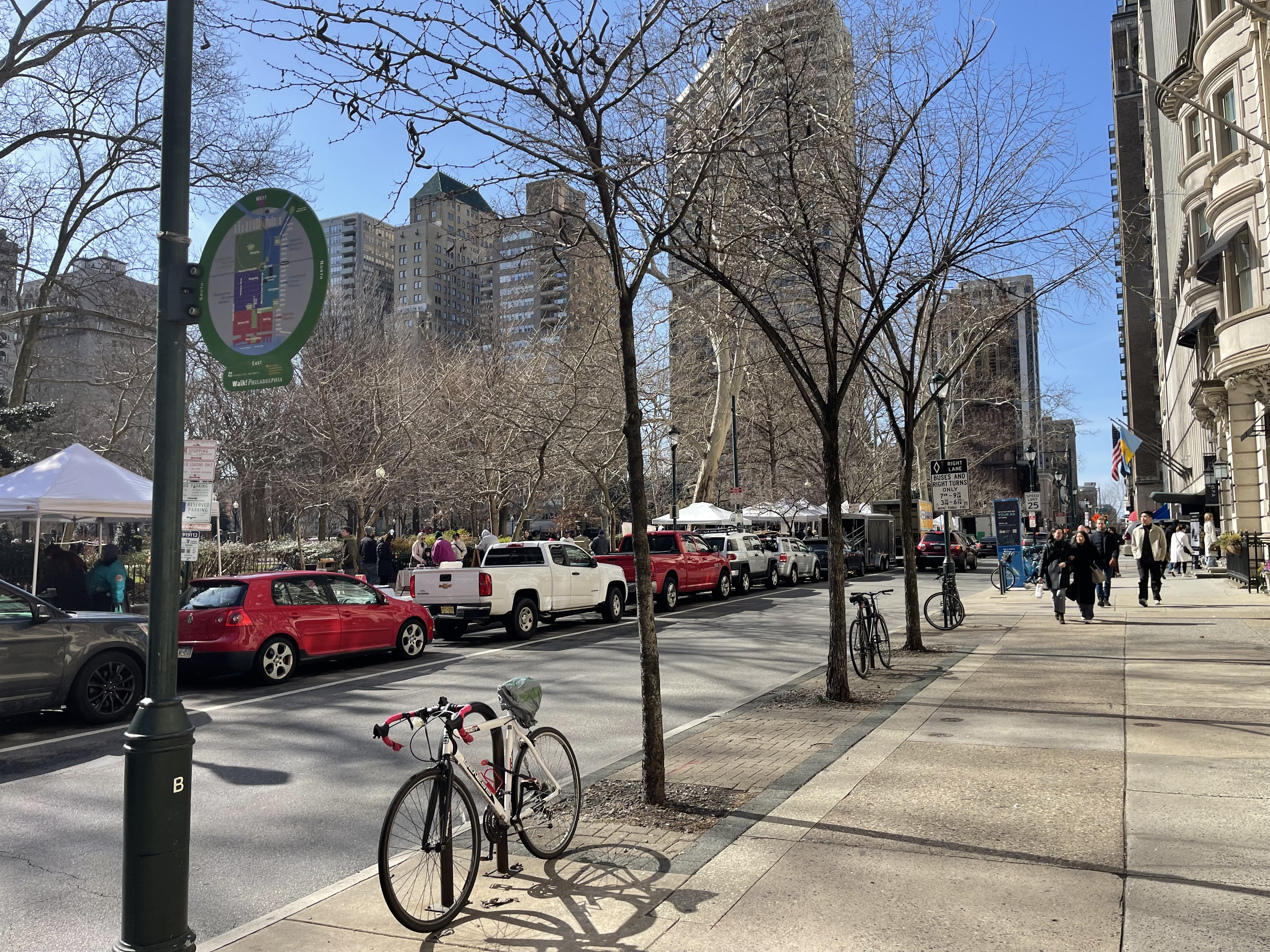
Walnut Street in Rittenhouse Square

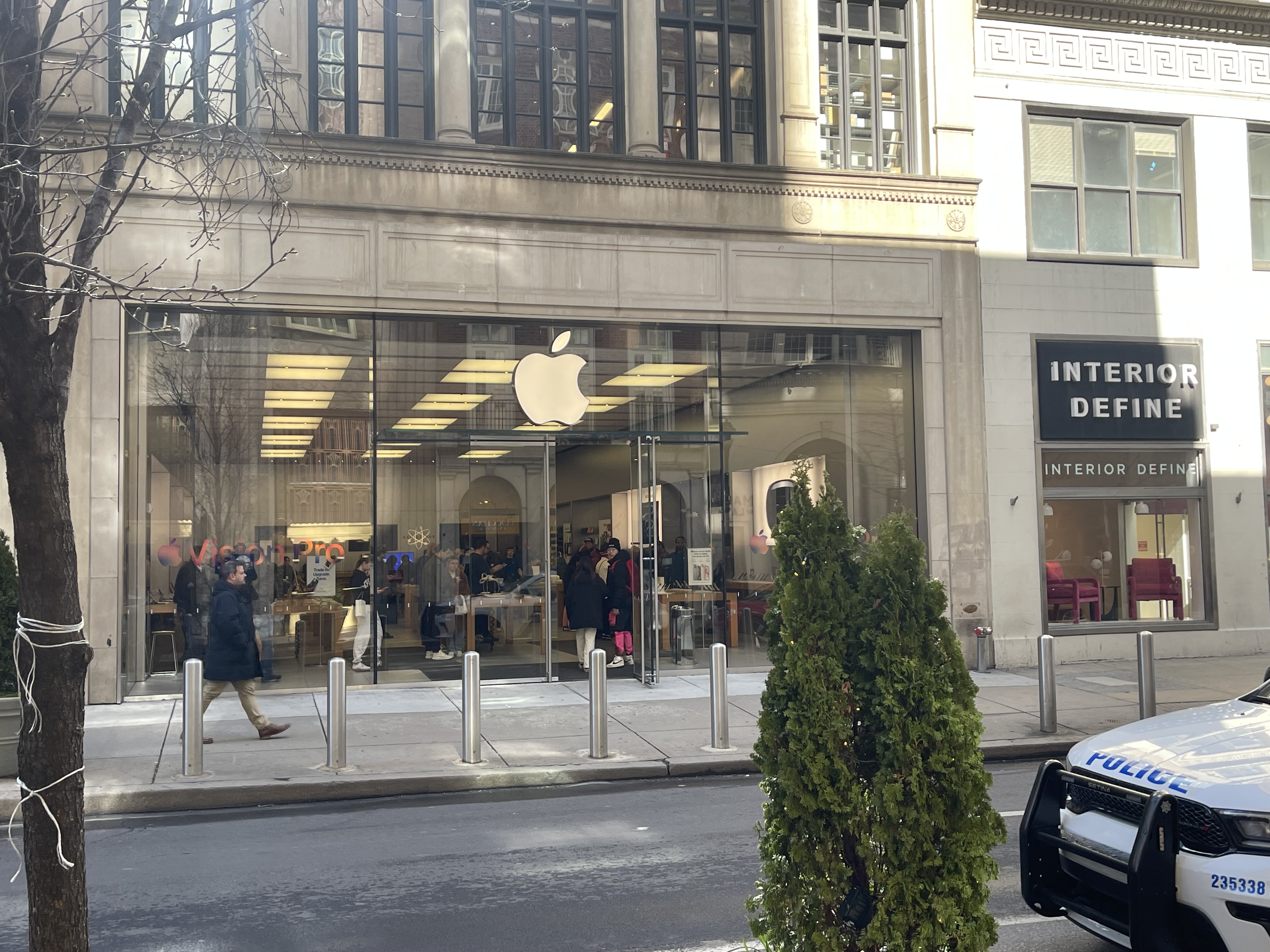
Apple Store on Walnut Street

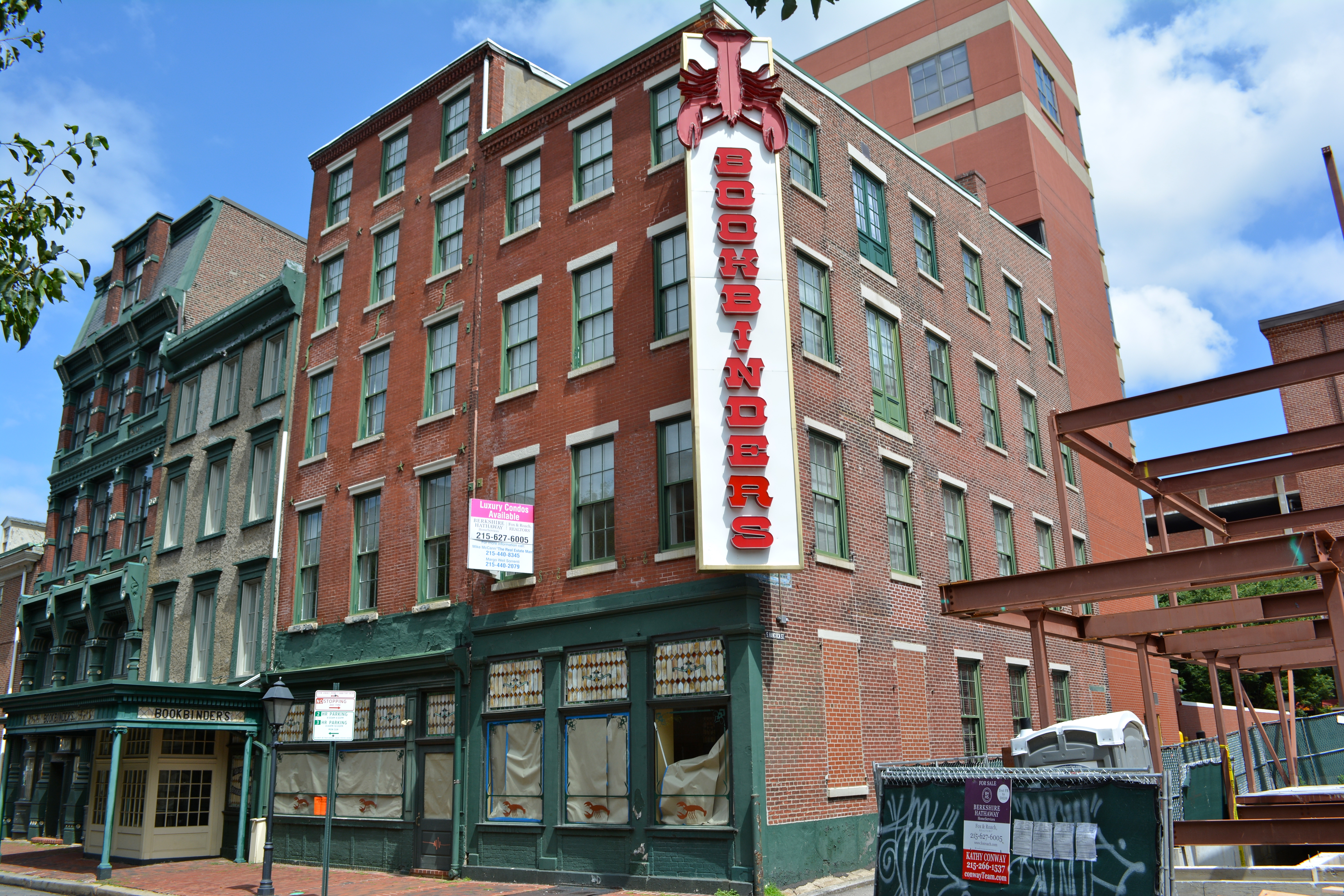
Bookbinders

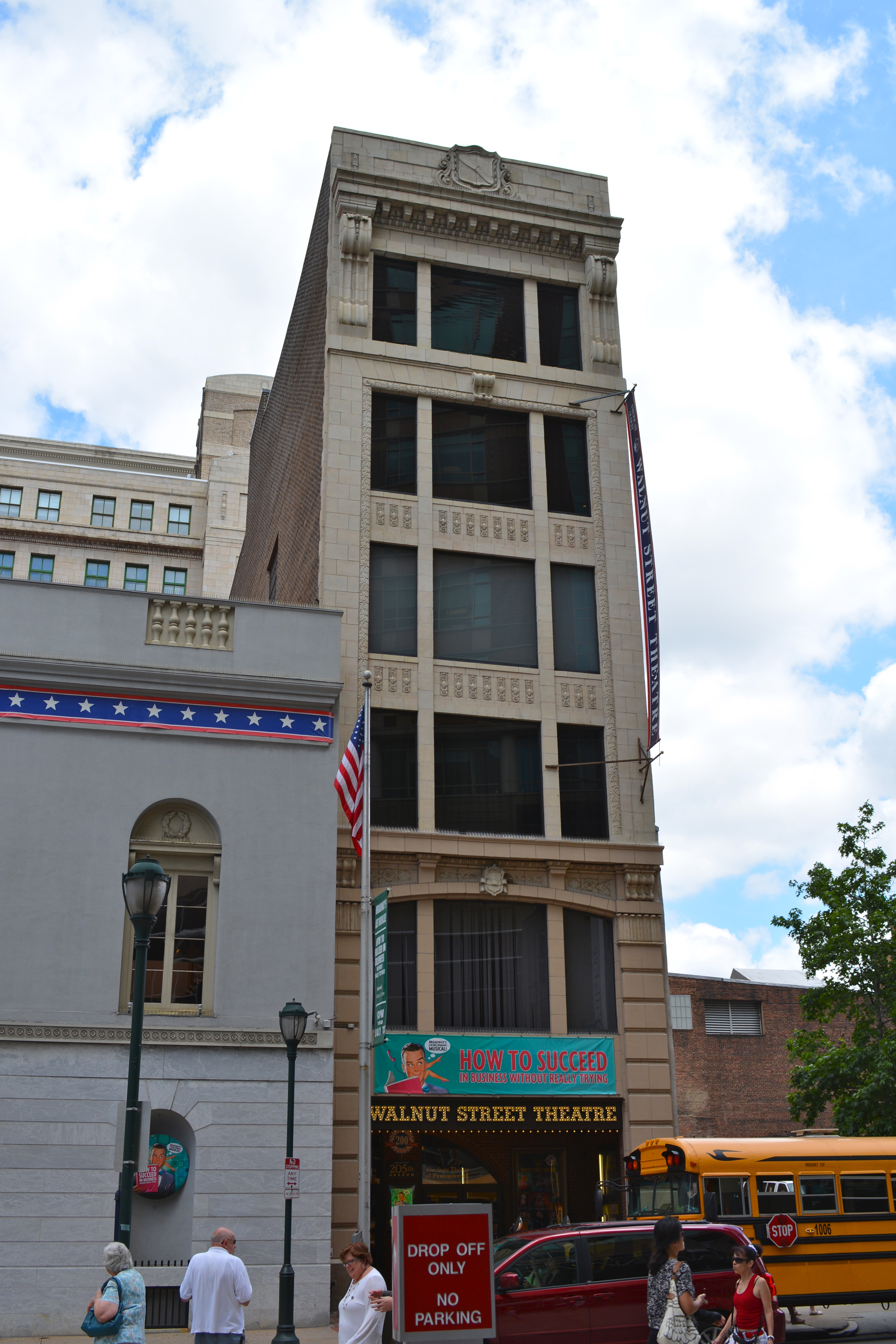
Walnut Street Theater
