= Walnut Park =

Walnut Park may refer to:

- Walnut Park, California, a Neighborhood in Huntington park, California.
- Walnut Park Elementary School, Smithers, British Columbia, Canada
- Walnut Street Park, a municipal park in Hillsboro, Oregon, U.S.

== See also ==
- Walnut Park Historic District
- Walnut Park East, St. Louis, Missouri
- Walnut Park West, St. Louis, Missouri
