= Walnut Bend =

Walnut Bend may refer to:

- Walnut Bend, Houston, a subdivision in Houston, Harris County, Texas
- Walnut Bend, Texas, an unincorporated community in Cooke County, Texas
- Walnut Bend Independent School District, a public school district in Cooke County, Texas
