= Walnut Township =

Walnut Township may refer to:

== Arkansas ==
- Walnut Township, Benton County, Arkansas, in Benton County, Arkansas
- Walnut Township, Montgomery County, Arkansas, in Montgomery County, Arkansas

== Illinois ==
- Walnut Township, Bureau County, Illinois

== Indiana ==
- Walnut Township, Marshall County, Indiana
- Walnut Township, Montgomery County, Indiana

== Iowa ==
- Walnut Township, Adair County, Iowa
- Walnut Township, Appanoose County, Iowa
- Walnut Township, Dallas County, Iowa
- Walnut Township, Fremont County, Iowa
- Walnut Township, Jefferson County, Iowa
- Walnut Township, Madison County, Iowa
- Walnut Township, Palo Alto County, Iowa
- Walnut Township, Polk County, Iowa
- Walnut Township, Wayne County, Iowa

== Kansas ==
- Walnut Township, Atchison County, Kansas
- Walnut Township, Barton County, Kansas
- Walnut Township, Bourbon County, Kansas
- Walnut Township, Brown County, Kansas
- Walnut Township, Butler County, Kansas
- Walnut Township, Cowley County, Kansas
- Walnut Township, Crawford County, Kansas
- Walnut Township, Jewell County, Kansas
- Walnut Township, Marshall County, Kansas, in Marshall County, Kansas
- Walnut Township, Pawnee County, Kansas, in Pawnee County, Kansas
- Walnut Township, Phillips County, Kansas, in Phillips County, Kansas
- Walnut Township, Reno County, Kansas, in Reno County, Kansas
- Walnut Township, Saline County, Kansas, in Saline County, Kansas

== Missouri ==
- Walnut Township, Adair County, Missouri
- Walnut Township, Bates County, Missouri

== Ohio ==
- Walnut Township, Fairfield County, Ohio
- Walnut Township, Gallia County, Ohio
- Walnut Township, Pickaway County, Ohio

== Oklahoma ==
- Walnut Township, Caddo County, Oklahoma, in Caddo County, Oklahoma
- Walnut Township, Noble County, Oklahoma, in Noble County, Oklahoma

== See also ==
- Walnut (disambiguation)
