= List of works by César Pelli =

The architect César Pelli has designed many noteworthy buildings in the span of his four-decade career; these include some of the tallest buildings in the world. The following are some of his major constructions:

== Completed ==
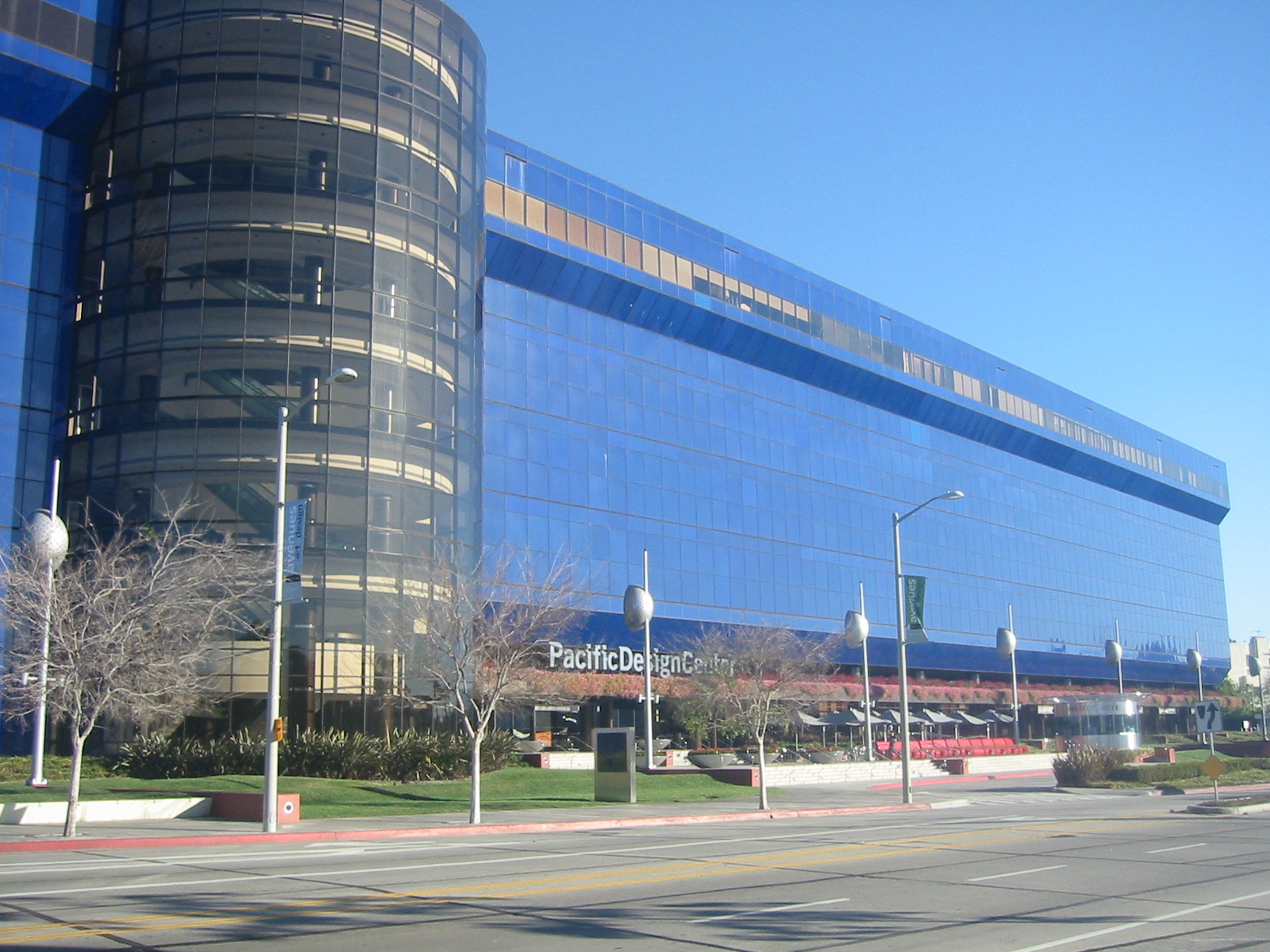
Pacific Design Center, West Hollywood, California (1975)

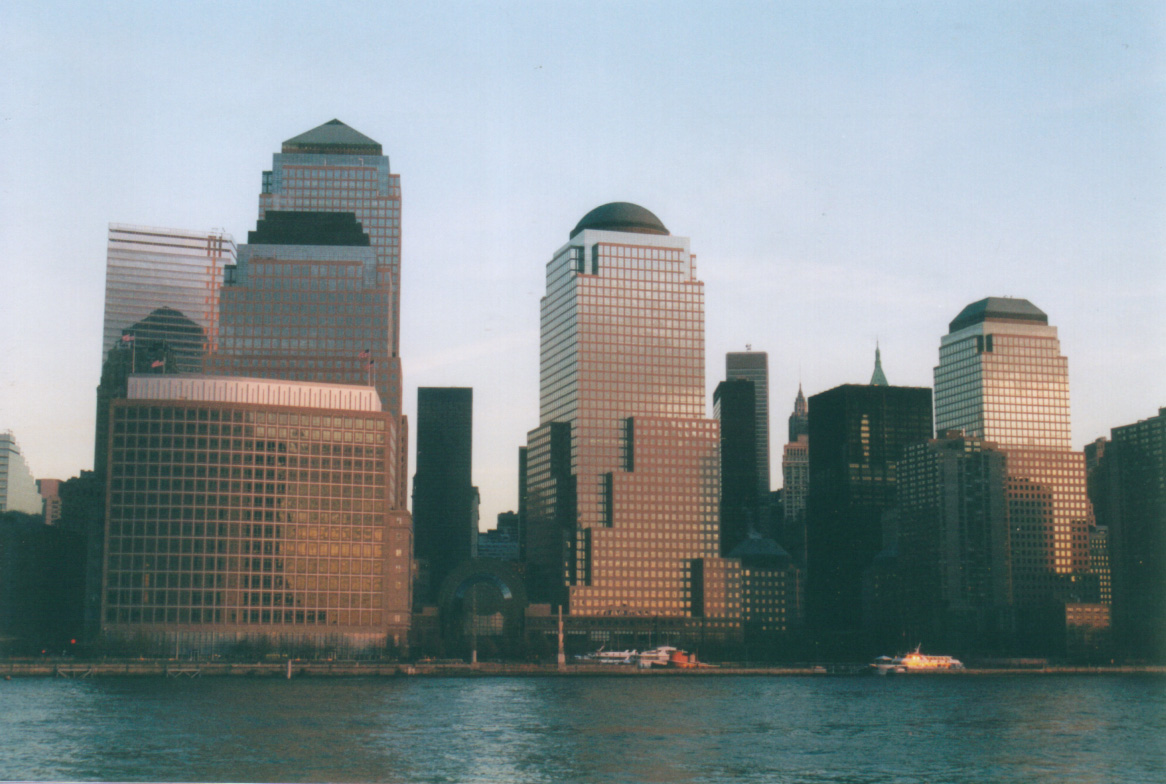
World Financial Center, New York City, NY (1987)

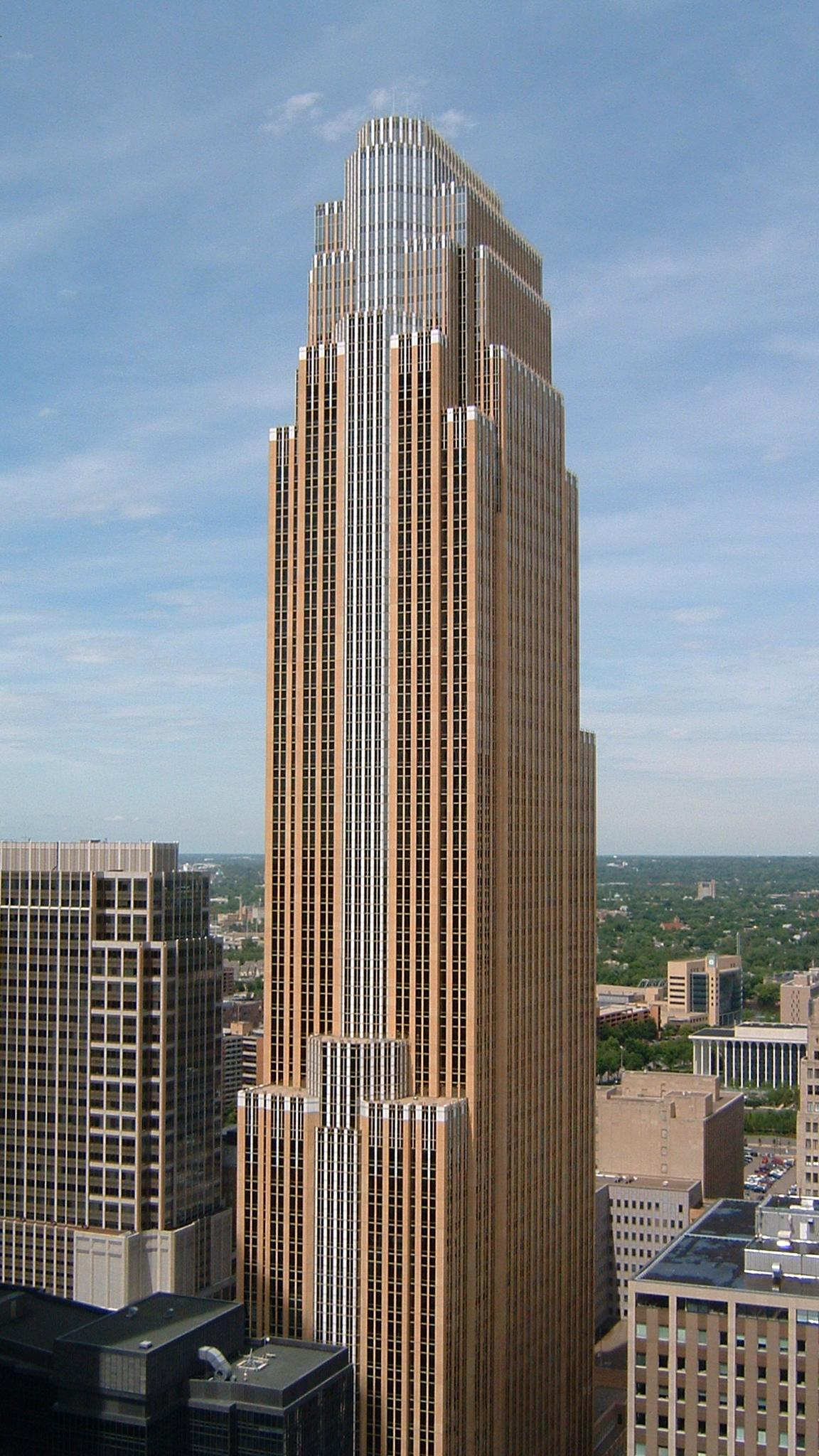
Wells Fargo Center, Minneapolis, Minnesota (1989)

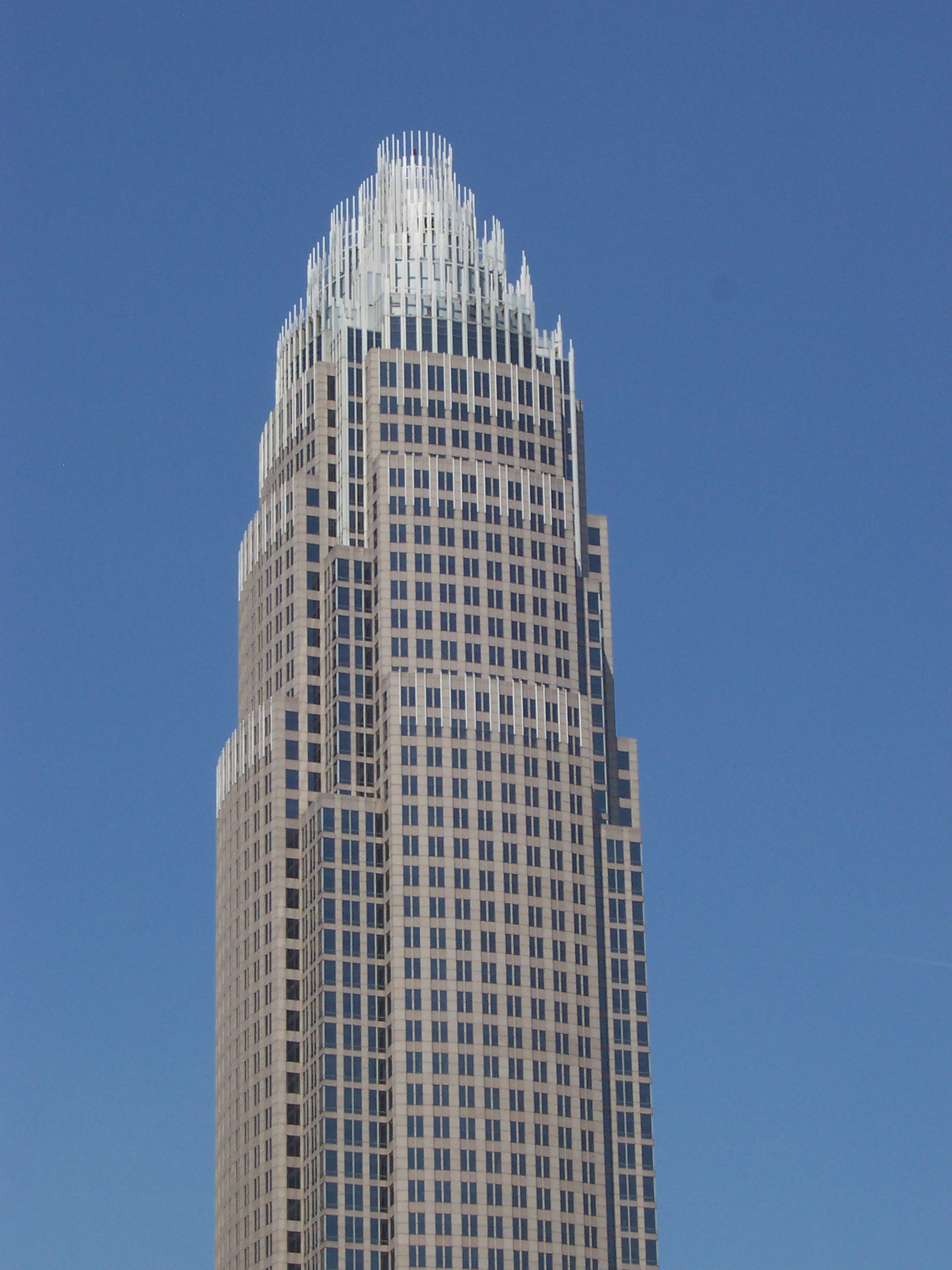
Bank of America Corporate Center, Charlotte, North Carolina (1992)

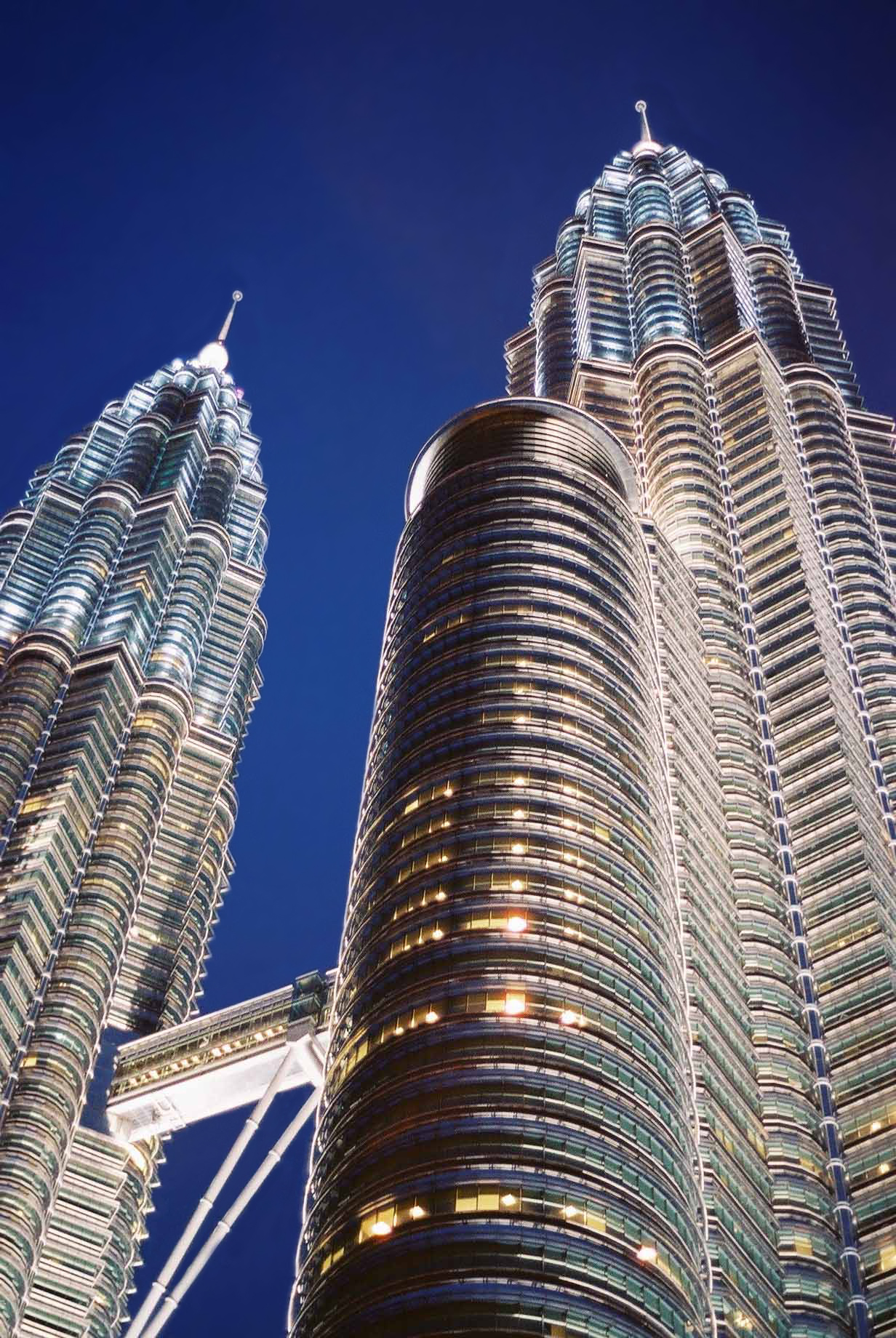
Petronas Twin Tower, Kuala Lumpur, Malaysia (1998)

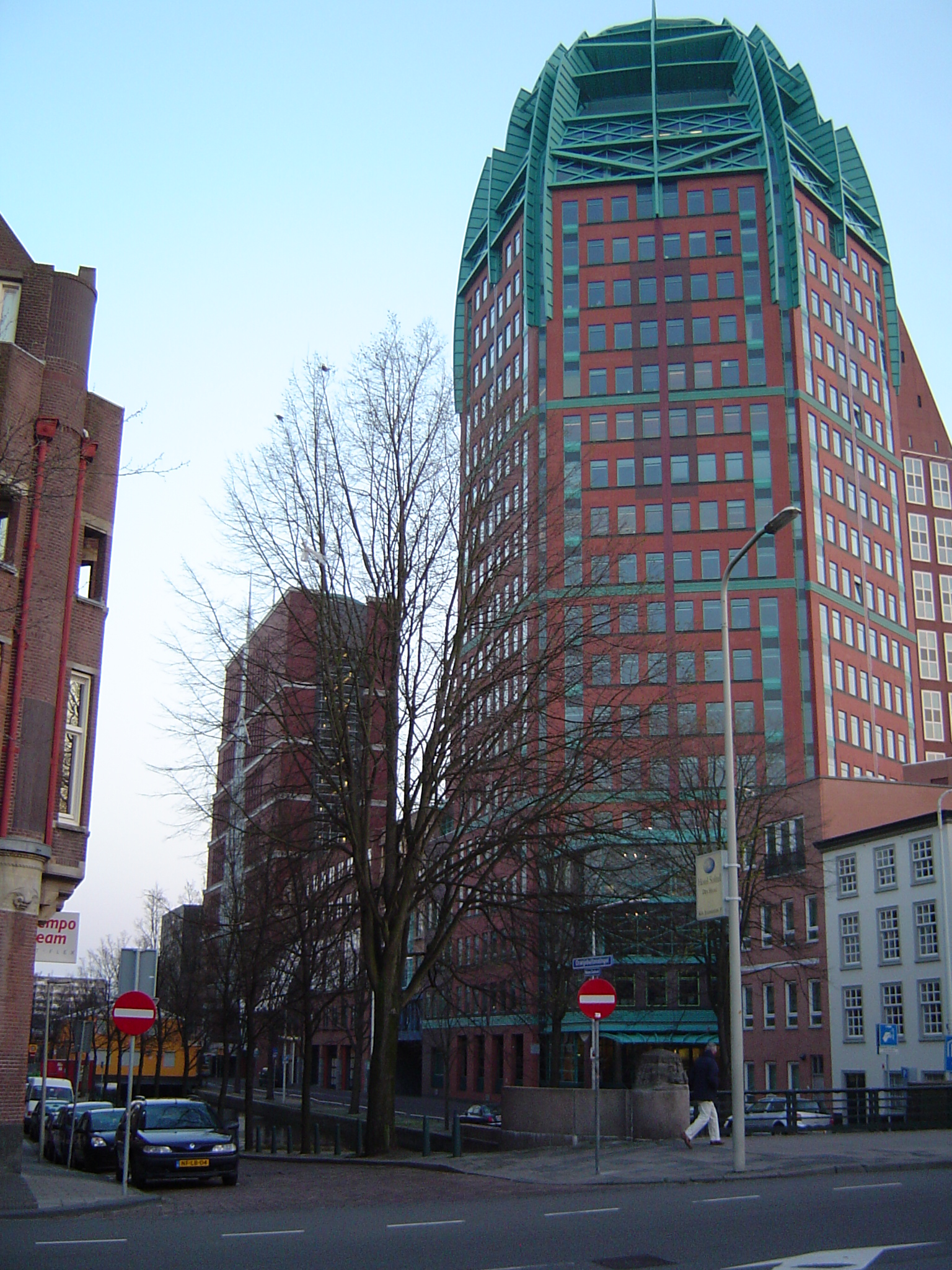
Zurich tower, The Hague, Netherlands (1999)

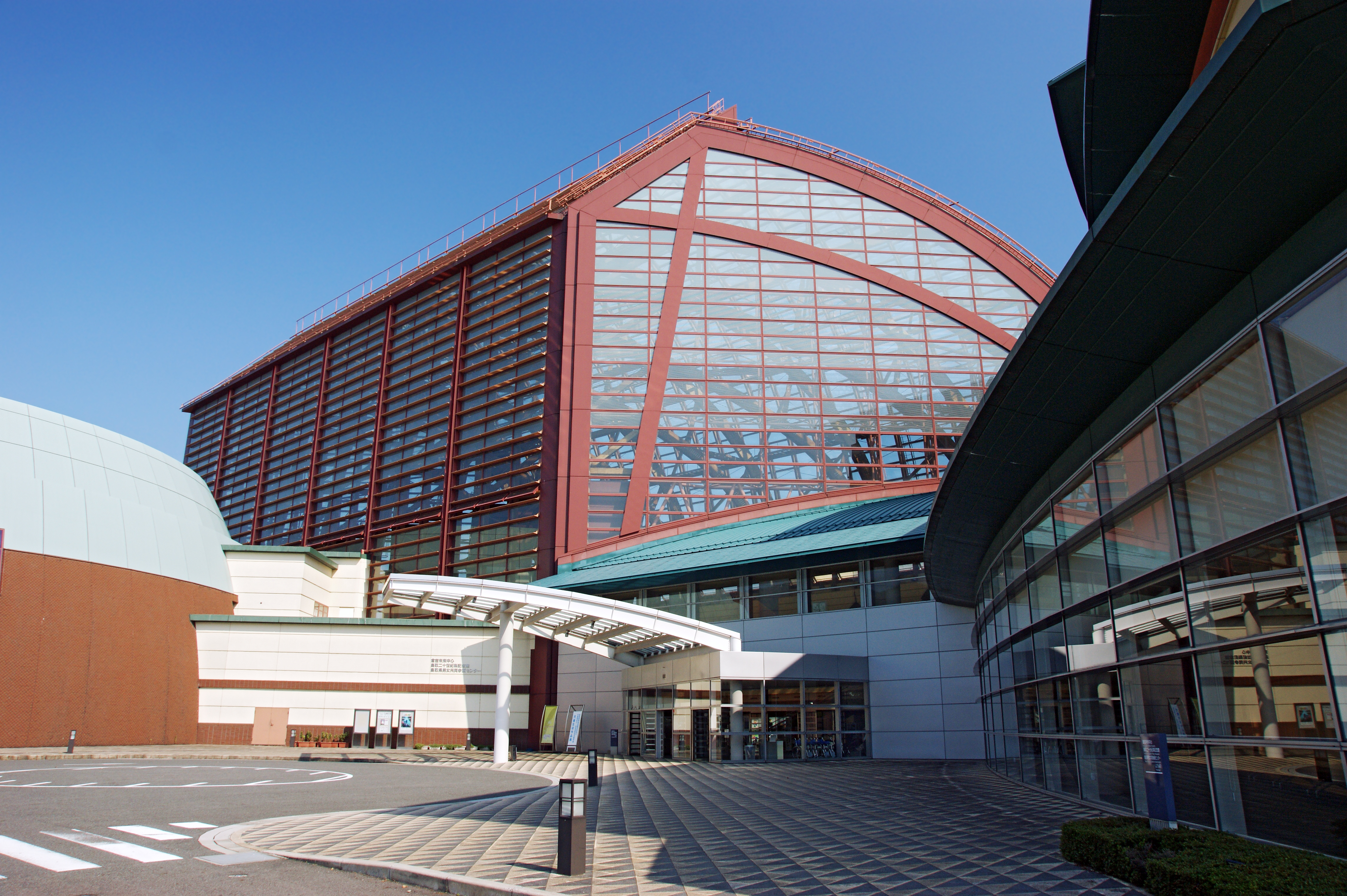
Kurayoshi Park Square, Kurayoshi, Japan (2000)

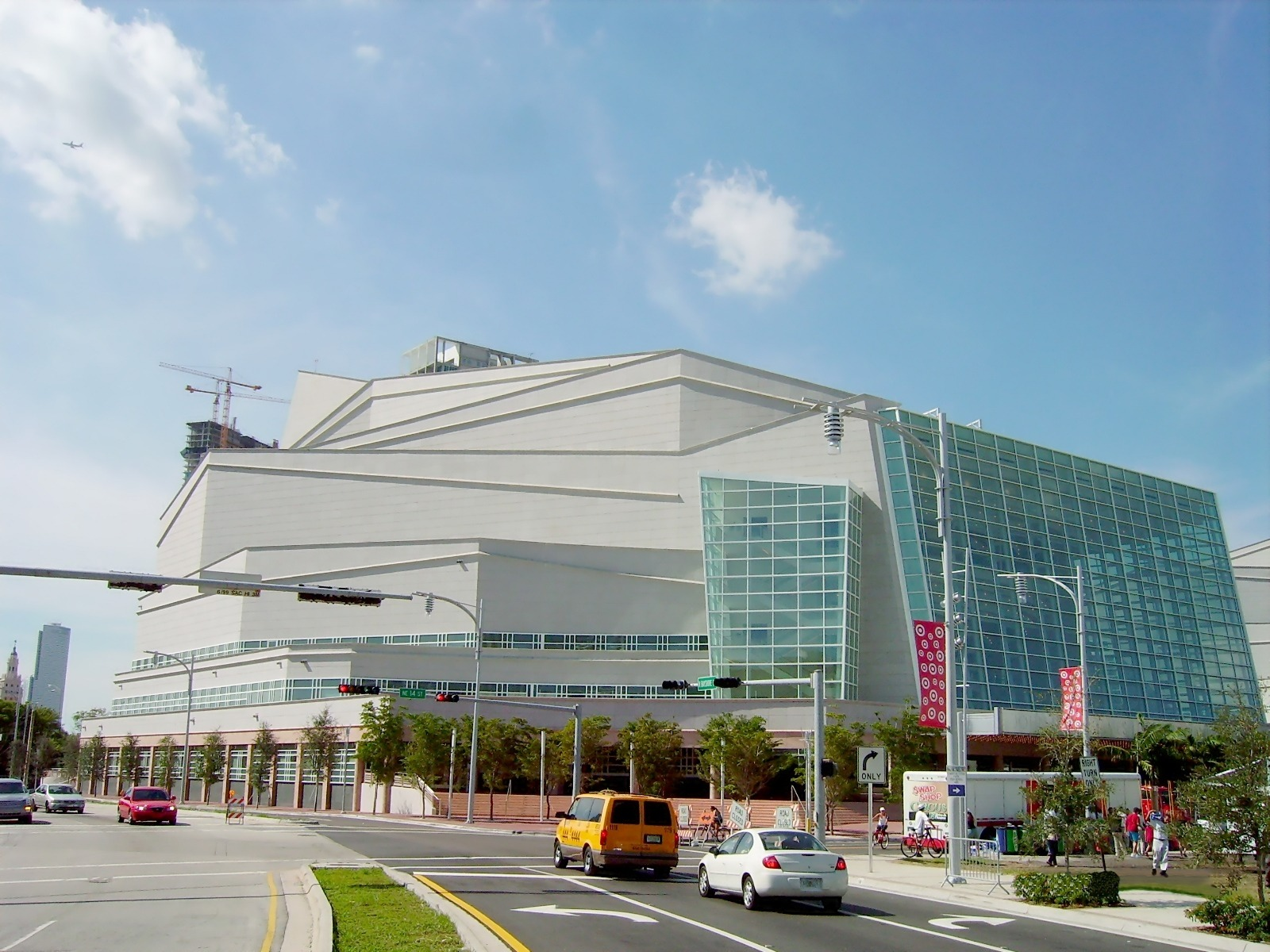
Adrienne Arsht Center for the Performing Arts, Miami, Florida (2006)

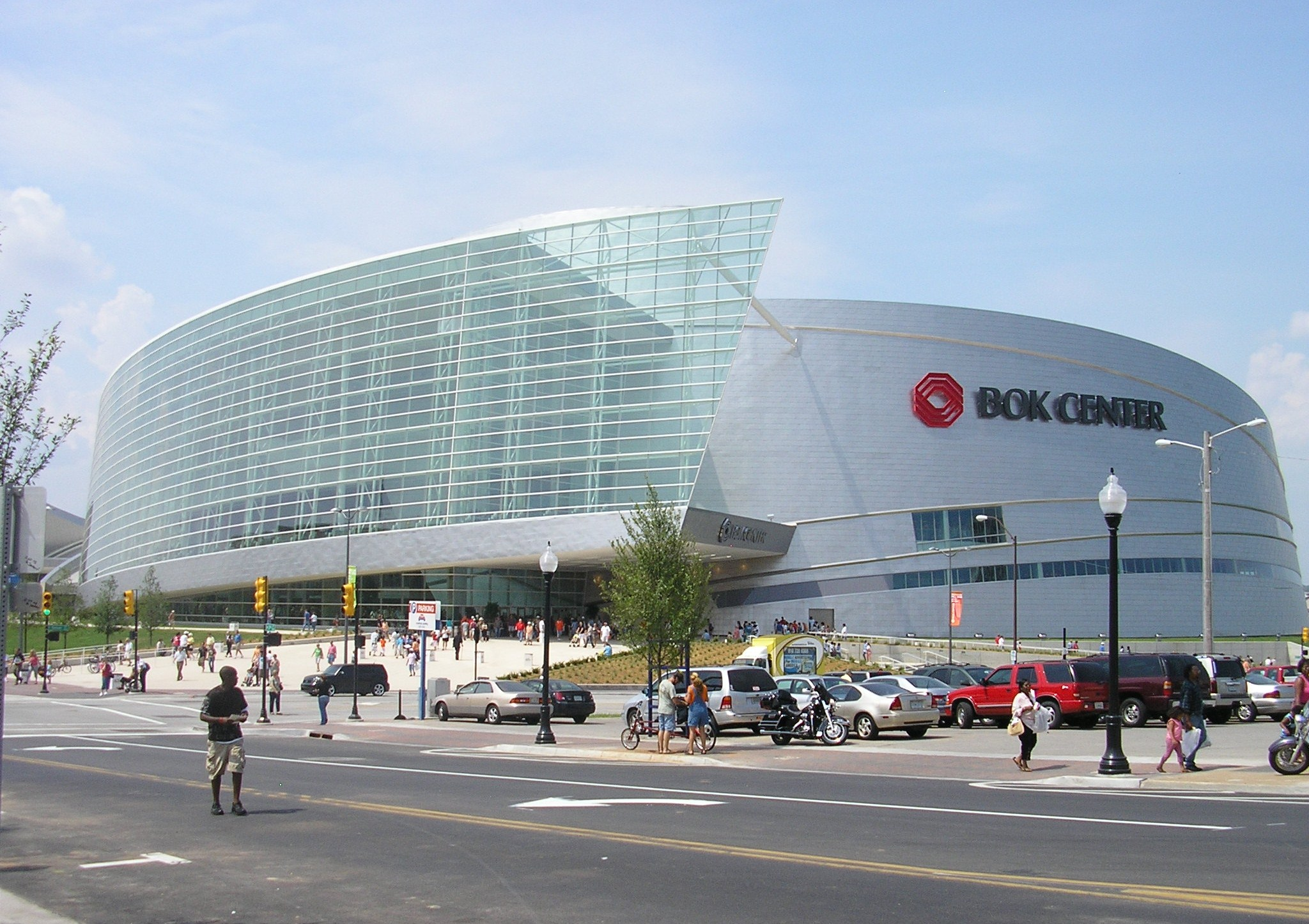
BOK Center, Tulsa, Oklahoma (2008)

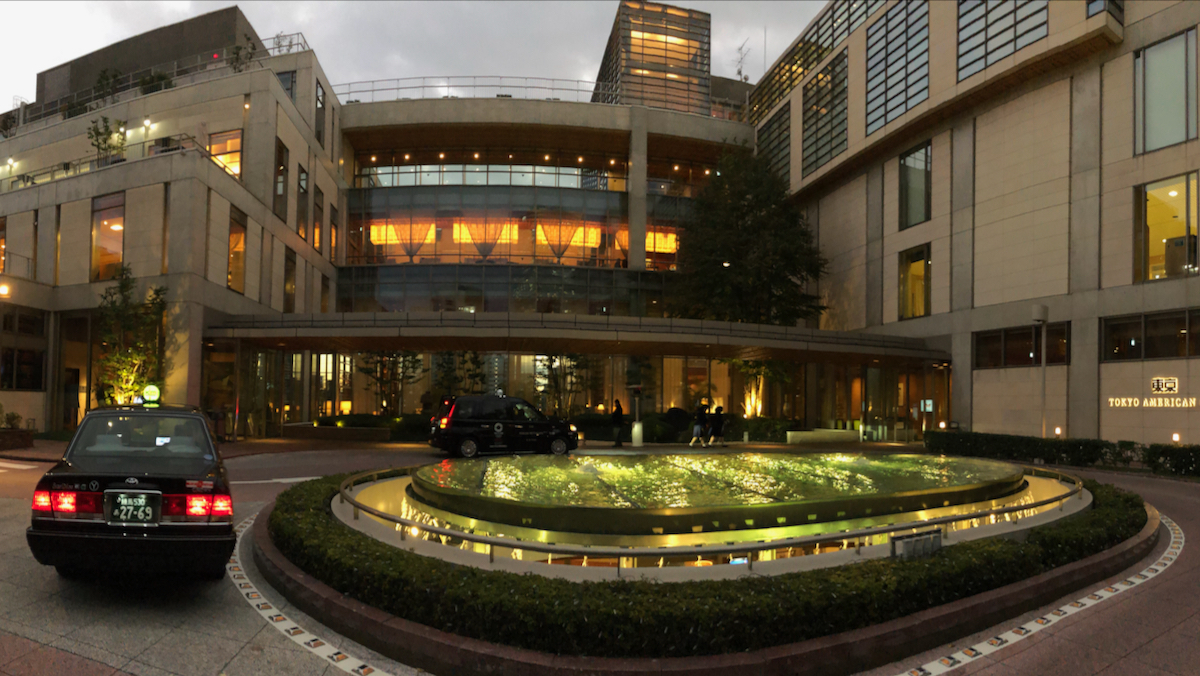
Tokyo American Club, Azabudai, Japan (2011)

Piazza Gae Aulenti and the UniCredit Tower, Milan, Italy (2012)

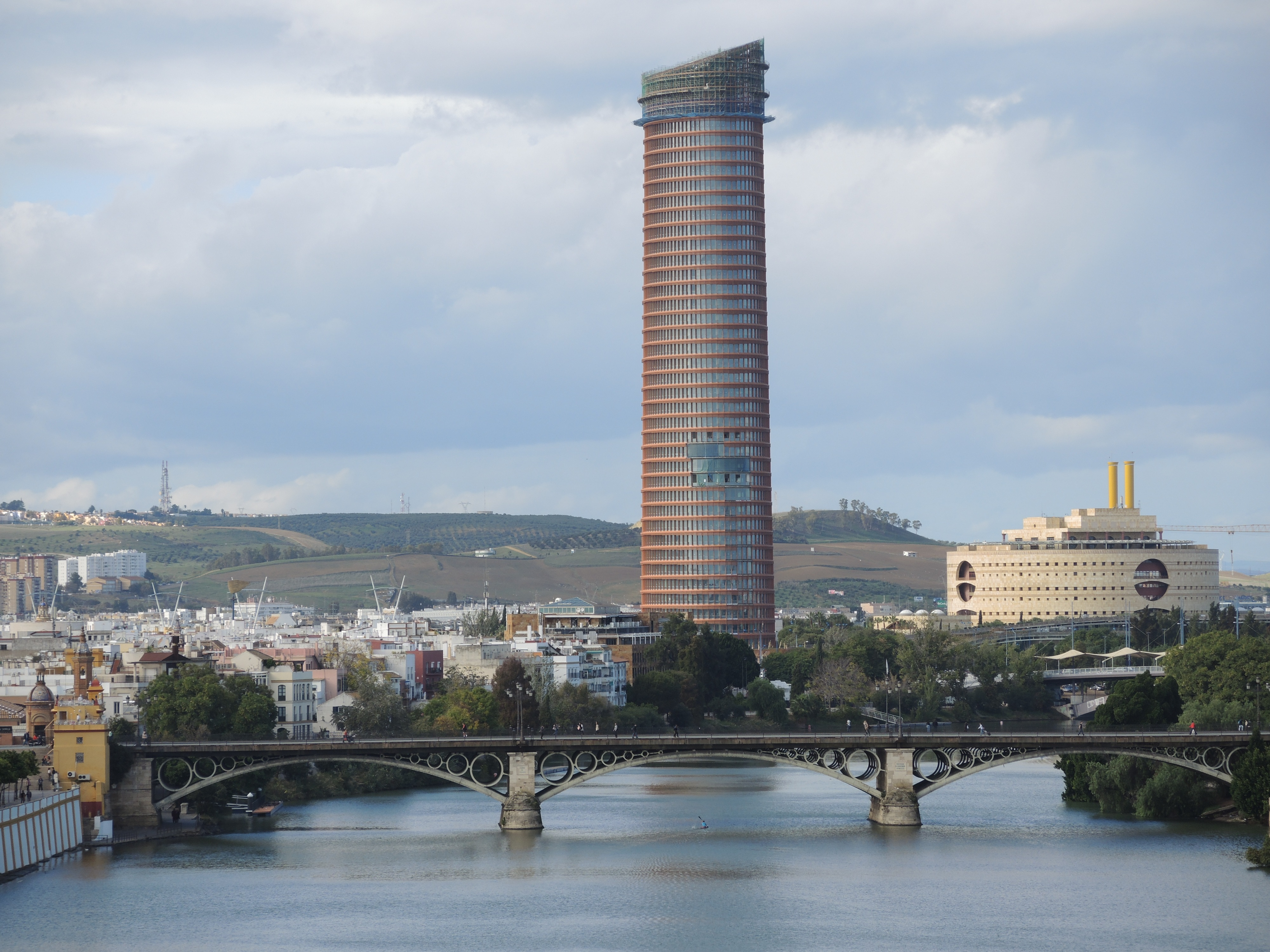
Sevilla Tower, Seville, Spain (2014)

=== 1960s ===
- 1966: Worldway Postal Center, Los Angeles International Airport
- 1967: Kukui Gardens housing, Honolulu, Hawaii
- 1969: San Bernardino City Hall, San Bernardino, California
- 1969: Century City Medical Plaza, Century City, Los Angeles, with architect Anthony J. Lumsden
- 1969: COMSAT building, Clarksburg, MD

=== 1970s ===
- 1971: 100 Wilshire, Santa Monica, California
- 1973: Commons Centre and Mall, Columbus, Indiana
- 1973: Eaton's Department Store, Vancouver, British Columbia, Canada
- 1973: Bank of California building, San Jose, California
- 1975: Pacific Design Center, Los Angeles
- 1976: Embassy of the United States, Tokyo
- 1977: Wintergarden Arboretum, Niagara Falls, New York, USA (demolished in 2009)

=== 1980s ===
- 1980: Kyobo Life Insurance Building, Seoul, South Korea
- 1981–1987: World Financial Center (now known as Brookfield Place), New York City, New York, USA
- 1982–1984: Herring Hall at Rice University, Houston, Texas
- 1982 Four Leaf Towers, Houston, Texas
- 1983 Four Oaks Place, Houston, Texas
- 1984: Residential Tower atop the Museum of Modern Art (MoMA), New York City
- 1984–1986: Cleveland Clinic, Cleveland, Ohio, USA
- 1984: Mattatuck Museum Arts and History Center renovation, Waterbury, Connecticut
- 1987: Blumenthal Performing Arts Center, Charlotte, North Carolina
- 1987–1990: Carnegie Hall Tower, New York City, New York, USA
- 1987-89: Maryland Residence, Bethesda, Maryland, USA
- 1987–1991: One Canada Square, Canary Wharf, London, England, UK
- 1988: Wells Fargo Center (formerly Norwest Center), Minneapolis, Minnesota
- 1989: Gaviidae Common, Minneapolis, Minnesota

=== 1990s ===
- 1990: Nippon Telegraph and Telephone Headquarters, Tokyo, Japan
- 1990: Roy Nutt Mathematics, Engineering & Computer Science Center at Trinity College, Hartford, Connecticut
- 1990: 181 West Madison Street, Chicago
- 1991: Key Tower, Cleveland, Ohio
- 1991: 777 Tower, Los Angeles, California
- 1991: O'Quinn (Formerly St. Lukes) Medical Tower, Houston, Texas
- 1991: Frances Lehman Loeb Art Center at Vassar College, Poughkeepsie, New York
- 1992: Bank of America Corporate Center, Charlotte, North Carolina
- 1992: Plaza Tower, Costa Mesa, California
- 1993: Wolfensohn Hall, Institute for Advanced Study in Princeton, New Jersey
- 1993: Worrell Professional Center, Wake Forest University School of Law, Winston-Salem, North Carolina
- 1994: Physics and Astronomy Building, University of Washington, Seattle, Washington USA
- 1995: Aronoff Center for Performing Arts, Cincinnati, Ohio
- 1995: 100 North Main Street (formerly Wachovia Center), Winston-Salem, North Carolina
- 1996: Edificio República, Buenos Aires, Argentina
- 1996: Residencial del Bosque, Mexico City, Mexico
- 1996: Owens Corning World Headquarters, Toledo, Ohio, USA
- 1996: Humanities and Social Sciences Building, University of California, Riverside, Riverside, California, USA
- 1997: Expansion of Washington National Airport, Washington, D.C.
- 1998: Overture Center, Madison, Wisconsin
- 1998: Petronas Twin Towers, Kuala Lumpur, Malaysia
- 1998: Schuster Center, Dayton, Ohio, USA
- 1999: Cheung Kong Center (長江集團中心), Hong Kong
- 1999: Zurich tower office building in The Hague, Netherlands

=== 2000s ===
- 2000: Kurayoshi Park Square, Kurayoshi, Japan
- 2000: Boston Bank Building, Buenos Aires, Argentina
- 2000: KABC-TV, Glendale, California
- 2001: Citigroup Centre, 25 Canada Square, Canary Wharf, London
- 2001: Bucksbaum Center for the Arts at Grinnell College, Grinnell, Iowa
- 2001: Athletic and Fitness Center at Grinnell College, Grinnell, Iowa
- 2001: The Investment Building, Washington, D.C.
- 2001: Atago Green Hills, Tokyo, Japan
- 2002: JP MorganChase Building, San Francisco
- 2002: Weber Music Hall at University of Minnesota Duluth, Duluth, Minnesota
- 2002: Former Enron Headquarters at 1500 Louisiana Street, Houston
- 2003: Gerald Ratner Athletics Center at University of Chicago, Chicago, Illinois
- 2003: Two International Finance Centre, Hong Kong
- 2013: Banco Macro Tower, Buenos Aires, Argentina
- 2003: Center for Drama and Film & the Martel Theater at Vassar College, Poughkeepsie, New York
- 2003: 25 Bank Street, Canary Wharf, Docklands, London
- 2003: 40 Bank Street, Canary Wharf, Docklands, London
- 2003: Benjamin & Mariam Schuster Performing Arts Center, Dayton, Ohio
- 2004: Goldman Sachs Tower, Jersey City, New Jersey
- 2004: Campus University Siglo 21, Córdoba, Argentina
- 2004: Bloomberg Tower, New York, New York
- 2005: Cira Centre, Philadelphia
- 2005: Malone Engineering Center, Yale University, New Haven, Connecticut
- 2006: Theodore Roosevelt United States Courthouse, Brooklyn, New York
- 2006: Science and Engineering Research and Classroom Complex at University of Houston, Houston
- 2006: Minneapolis Public Library's Central branch, Minneapolis
- 2006: Joe Rosenfield '25 Center, Grinnell College, Grinnell, Iowa
- 2006: Renée and Henry Segerstrom Concert Hall, Segerstrom Center For The Arts, Orange County Performing Arts Center, Costa Mesa, California
- 2006: Thomas E. Golden Jr. Center, St. Thomas More Catholic Chapel and Center, Yale University, New Haven, Connecticut
- 2006: Adrienne Arsht Center for the Performing Arts, Miami
- 2006: Madison Museum of Contemporary Art Madison, Wisconsin
- 2008: BOK Center, Tulsa, Oklahoma
- 2008: One Park West, Liverpool, England
- 2008: Torre de Cristal, Madrid, Spain
- 2008: Repsol-YPF Building, Buenos Aires, Argentina
- 2008: St. Regis Residences & Hotel, Mexico City, Mexico
- 2008: Business Instructional Facility, University of Illinois at Urbana–Champaign, Illinois
- 2009: Cooperative Arts and Humanities High School, New Haven, Connecticut
- 2009: Connecticut Science Center, Hartford, Connecticut
- 2009: Aria Resort & Casino, the central feature of CityCenter, Las Vegas

=== 2010s ===
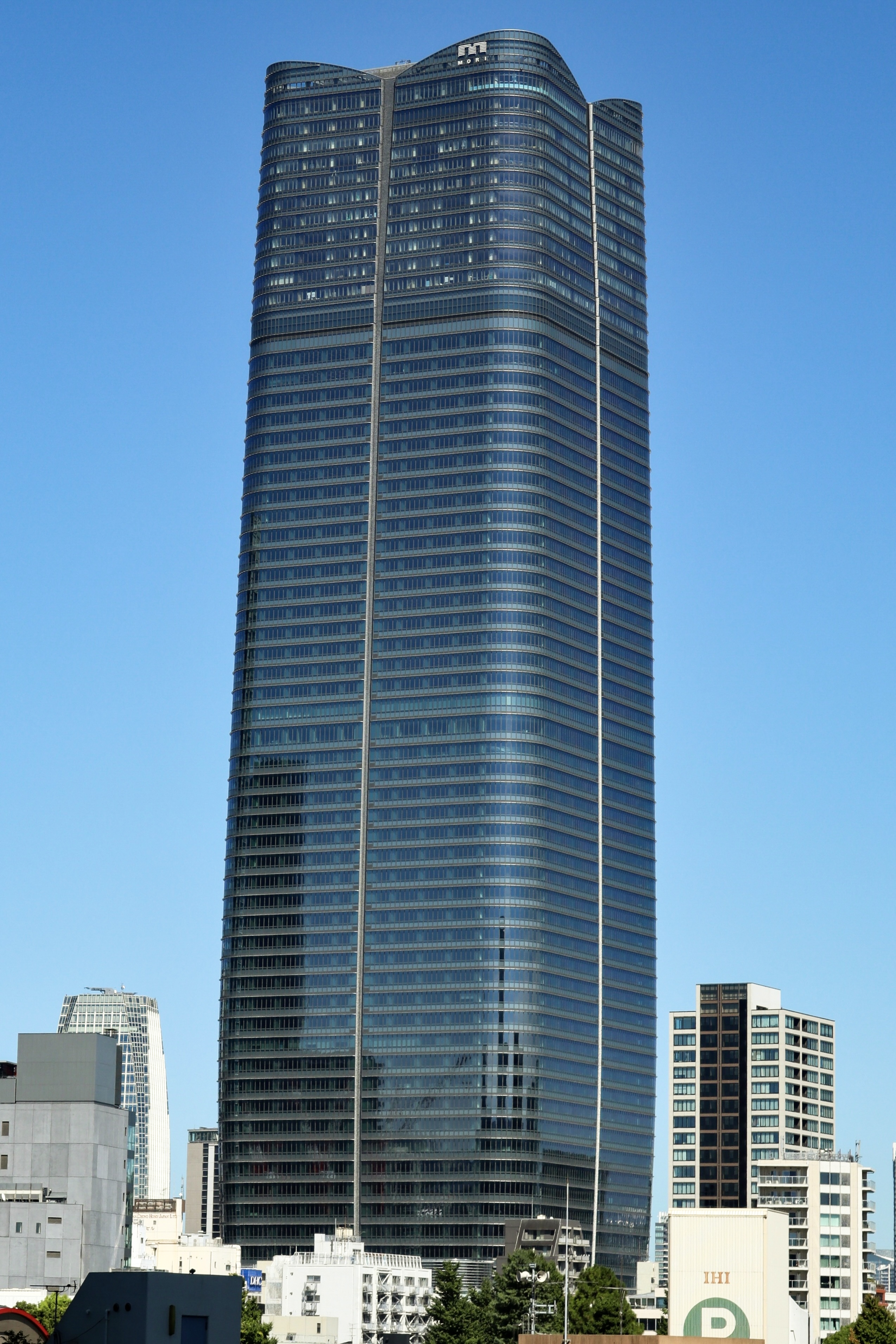
Azabudai Hills Mori JP Tower, Tokyo, Japan (2023)

- 2010: Shanghai IFC, Pudong, sister project of Two International Finance Centre in Hong Kong
- 2010: Gran Torre Santiago, Santiago, Chile
- 2010: Torre Mesoamericana, Tuxtla Gutiérrez, Mexico
- 2011: Tokyo American Club, Tokyo, Japan
- 2011: New Airport Terminal Building (Phase 1), Winnipeg James Armstrong Richardson International Airport, Winnipeg, Canada
- 2011: Iberdrola Tower, office building, Bilbao, Spain
- 2011: St. Katharine Drexel Chapel, Xavier University of Louisiana, New Orleans
- 2012: Unicredit Tower, master plan and mixed-use development, Milan, Italy
- 2012: Ark Hills Sengokuyama Mori Tower, Tokyo, Japan
- 2013: The Landmark, Abu Dhabi, United Arab Emirates
- 2013: DePaul University, The Theatre School, Chicago
- 2014: Abeno Harukas, Osaka, Japan
- 2015: Cameron and Edward Lanphier Center, Choate Rosemary Hall, Wallingford, Connecticut
- 2015: Sevilla Tower, office building, Seville, Spain
- 2015: Torre Sofia, San Pedro Garza García, Mexico
- 2015: Maral Explanada, Mar del Plata, Argentina
- 2016: McKinney & Olive, Mixed-Use Development, Dallas, Texas
- 2016: Hancher Auditorium, University of Iowa Iowa City, Iowa
- 2016: The Cabin Stack Prefabricated House
- 2016: Eccles Theater, performing arts center, Salt Lake City
- 2016: São Paulo Corporate Towers, office building, São Paulo, Brazil
- 2017: Indiana University School of Informatics, Luddy Hall, Indiana University Bloomington, Indiana
- 2017: Cira Center South, Philadelphia
- 2017: Wintrust Arena, Chicago, Illinois
- 2017: Sidra Medical Center, Qatar
- 2018: Salesforce Tower, San Francisco
- 2018: Transbay Transit Center, San Francisco
- 2019: Louis Armstrong International Airport, New Terminal, New Orleans

=== 2020s ===
- 2022: Torre Mítikah, Mexico City
- 2023: Azabudai Hills, Tokyo, Japan
- 2025: South Station Tower, Boston

=== Proposed ===
- 2013: Mirador del Valle, Salta, Argentina
- 1988: Miglin-Beitler Skyneedle, Chicago
- 1965: Sunset Mountain Park, Santa Monica, California, Cesar Pelli and A.J.Lumsden
- 1980: Indiana Tower, Indianapolis, Indiana

=== Duke University revitalization ===
- In 2007, Duke University commissioned him to plan a 20- to 50-year revitalization of its Central Campus.
