= Joaquín Hernández =

Joaquín Hernández may refer to:

- Joaquín Hernández (basketball) (1933-1965), Spanish basketball player and coach
- Joaquín Hernández (footballer) (born 1971), Mexican footballer

== See also ==
- Quino Hernández (born 1964), born Joaquín Hernández Hernández, Spanish cyclist
- Joaquín Fernández (disambiguation)
