= Business Instructional Facility =

Gies College of Business Instructional Facility
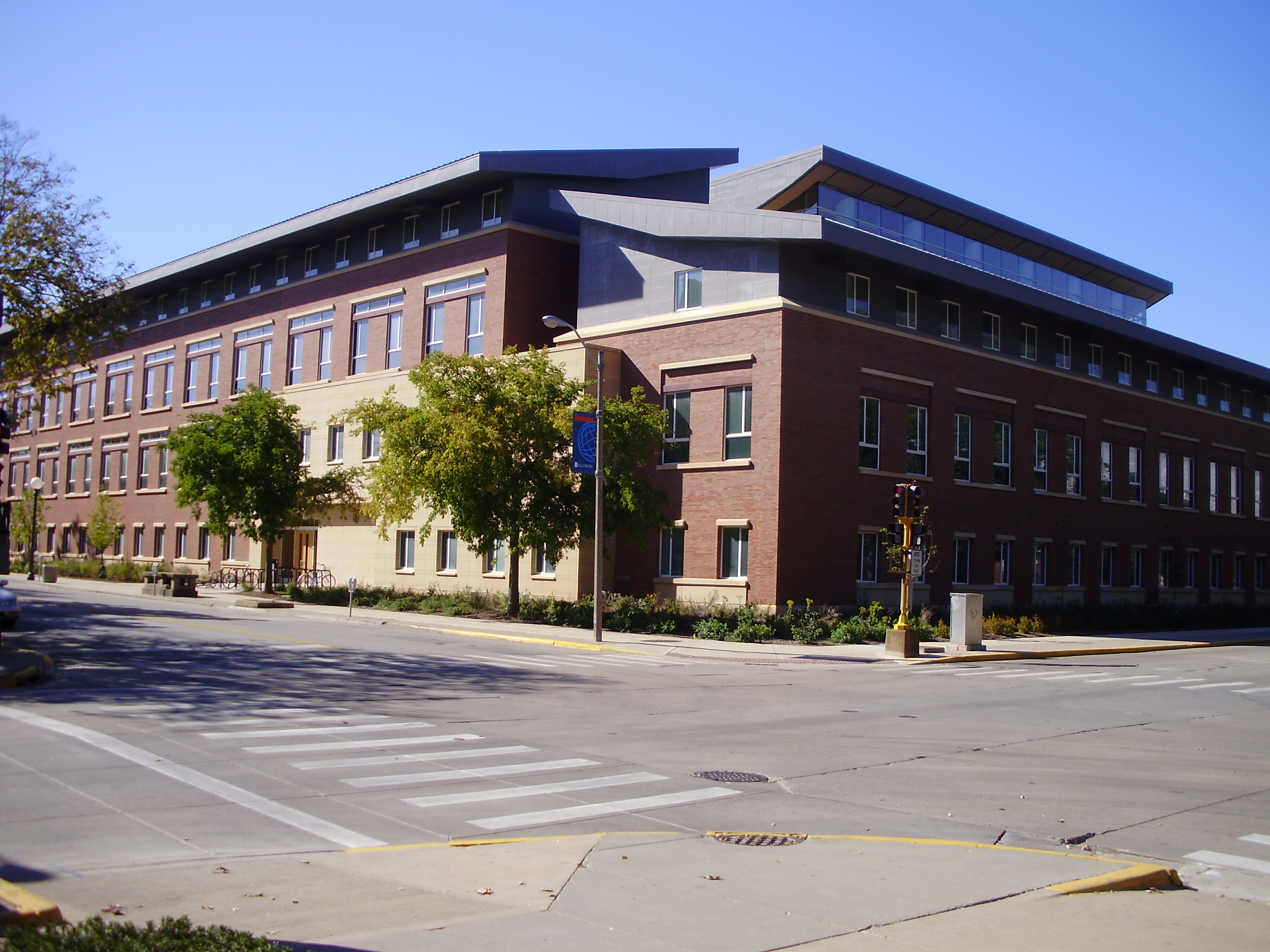
- Interactive map of the Gies College of Business Instructional Facility area

General information
- Type: Academics
- Location: 515 E. Gregory Drive; Champaign, Illinois 61820; United States
- Coordinates: 40°6′13.33″N 88°13′51.34″W
- Construction started: 2006
- Completed: 2008
- Inaugurated: October 17, 2008

Technical details
- Floor count: 4
- Floor area: 160,000 sq ft (15,000 m^{2})

Design and construction
- Architect: Pelli Clarke Pelli Architects

The Gies College of Business Instructional Facility (BIF) is a business facility designed by Pelli Clarke Pelli Architects located on the Champaign campus at the University of Illinois Urbana–Champaign (UIUC).

The facility is home to numerous classrooms, career development and academic counseling centers, student program offices, a recruitment suite, a 300-seat auditorium, and a study area for students.

Rafael Pelli, a partner of Pelli Clarke Pelli Architects who was the project principal for the Business Instructional Facility, explained in an interview on October 17, 2008 (shortly after completion) that the purpose of this building is to serve as "a sense of place, a community, a center to the College of Business".

The building is the first business facility at a public university in the world to achieve a platinum certification through Leadership in Energy and Environmental Design (LEED), a U.S. Green Building Council rating system used to measure the sustainability in construction, and is the first building on the UIUC campus to achieve a LEED certification.

The noteworthy 'green' elements of the Business Instructional Facility include solar panels, a green roof, and an energy-efficient cooling and heating system. The combined 'green' initiatives are expected to produce savings of $300,000 per year in comparison with traditional classroom buildings on the UIUC campus. The cost of construction was approximately $60 million and covers 160,000 sq ft (15,000 m^{2})

== History ==
On July 14, 2005, the University of Illinois Board of Trustees approved the Business Instructional Facility plans allowing the College of Business to begin requesting bids for site preparation and construction. On April 28, 2006, the UIUC College of Business held a groundbreaking ceremony at the Business Instructional Facility construction site in Champaign, Illinois. Construction of the Business Instructional Facility was completed in the summer of 2008 and the building opened for classes in August 2008.

== Description ==
The Business Instructional Facility (BIF) architecture has been described as "adding a sympathetic and fresh flavor to the campus's rich fabric of Georgian architecture while including sustainable features." The geometry of BIF is defined by "three perimeter bar buildings" composed of native brick and natural stone forming a 'U' shape. The commons "provides grandness and warmth" to BIF. Craig Copeland, a senior associate of Pelli Clarke Pelli Architects, characterized the daylight provided by BIF's glass curtain wall as "a part of the architectural expression". Rafael Pelli described the commons as "the central space, not only physically central, but it's central to the functioning and the use of the space." César Pelli, a renowned Argentinian architect and partner of Pelli Clark Pelli Architects, described BIF as "a family of its own character, its own quality."

Wolff Landscape Architecture described the garden courtyard as an entity defined on three sides by the building and thus creates a "continuous indoor-outdoor space" between the commons and the courtyard. The courtyard is arranged with linear pieces of pavement which elongates the building geometry. A raised trough serves as the base of the linear fountain that runs from one end of the courtyard to the other. A linear native prairie plant section and sedge meadow area, split by a path for surface drainage, provides stormwater retention and is adjacent to the fountain. The landscaping contributed to the LEED platinum rating through use of "native plants, on-site stormwater retention, green roofs, and no potable water use." In 2009, the landscape architecture received recognition through the Illinois Chapter American Society of Landscape Architects Merit Award for their design of the garden courtyard at the Business Instructional Facility. In 2020, Wolff Landscape Architecture became a part of Confluence, a Des Moines, Iowa-based landscape architecture, urban design and planning firm.

== Building layout ==
=== First floor ===
The commons area is the central space for students to study. This space also serves host to student events and corporate receptions. The auditorium provides a space for guest lectures, seminars, and conferences. The Margolis Market Information Lab (MIL), located in the northwest corner of the first floor, serves as an informative platform for electronic sources of financial and investment data and analytical software through multi-screen stations similar to those used in financial markets. The first floor also features the Trading Lab, located adjacent to MIL, which provides "time-delayed" financial data from major media sources. The Business Career Services, located in the northeast corner, assists students in their job search with resume critiques, mock interviews, and job search strategy. The PricewaterhouseCoopers Accountancy Student Center offers students studying accounting advising for courses, independent study, jobs, and scholarships and financial aid. Some of the other main features of the main floor include student lounges, the Business Office of Undergraduate Affairs, and a corporate recruitment center.

=== Upper floors ===
The second and third floors include classrooms and break rooms. The Illinois MBA Program, located on the third floor, provides student classrooms, student services, and lounges. The third floor is also home to the Illinois Makerlab, the world's first business school 3D printing lab. Also, the fourth floor, located on the east side of BIF, has many meeting spaces and faculty offices.

=== Green roof ===
According to Rob Kanter, the green roof on the Business Instructional Facility is composed of two different sections, a 1,200-square-foot (110 m^{2}) section located on the fourth floor roof and a smaller area over the auditorium. The green roof contains low maintenance plants growing in a layer of substrate that captures water allowing much less stormwater runoff. Rob Kanter adds that green roofs "discharge cleaner water, thanks to the filtering effect of the substrate and the ... runoff doesn't pick up additional pollutants from the roof itself." Furthermore, the green roof provides better heat reflection in warm weather and insulation in cooler weather. Also, the Department of Civil Engineering at UIUC has placed monitoring equipment on both sections to study the water quality runoff and insulating capacity in comparison to conventional roofs.

== Sustainable design elements ==
The LEED rating system criteria is divided into 5 categories: sustainable site, energy and atmosphere, water efficiency, materials and resources, and indoor environmental quality. Rafael Pelli admitted that the "biggest challenge is designing a good green building is making the early commitment early on in the process and then incorporating suggestions from various members of the design team."

=== Sustainable site ===
According to LEED design standards and "Green Building Facts", an erosion and sedimentation control plan was developed to limit pollution caused by stormwater runoff. Also, a stormwater management plan was instilled to prevent pollution and disruption of natural water flows. The site of the Business Instructional Facility, formerly a parking lot, was reused and improved limiting the development footprint of the project. Also, the Business Instructional Facility is located near public transportation, Champaign-Urbana Mass Transit District, mitigating land development due to automobiles.

=== Energy and atmosphere ===
According to LEED design standards and "Green Building Facts", the fundamental commissioning of building's energy systems verified that these items were installed and calibrated as established by the project. Automatic light dimmers were installed to detect natural light and adjust synthetic light sources accordingly to reduce energy consumption. Motion sensors power light fixtures off when rooms are empty to also limit energy use. Triple pane windows that comprise the glass curtain wall provide "phenomenal thermal and acoustical insulation" in addition to high performance insulation. The zinc roof reflects solar radiation away from the building reducing cooling costs. Zero employment of CFC-based refrigerants in heating, air conditioning, ventilating, and refrigeration systems reduces ozone depletion. The Business Instructional Facility receives approximately 8% of its electricity demand from 4,000 square feet (370 m^{2}) of solar panels on the auditorium roof.

=== Water efficiency ===
Water use reduction was accomplished with low volume shower heads, toilets, and facets. Also, potable water consumption was eliminated through low maintenance and drought resistant landscaping.

=== Materials and resources ===
A construction waste management plan was implemented in order to reduce landfill waste from job site.

=== Indoor environmental quality ===
A displacement air system has been installed to efficiently transport warm and cool air throughout the building. This system provides "filtered, humidity controlled, low velocity air" to the entire building. Also, monitoring equipment ensures that the "ventilation systems maintain minimum design requirements", especially carbon dioxide levels, "help promote occupant comfort and well-being".
