= Joaquín Fernández =

Joaquín Fernández may refer to:

- Joaquín Fernández de Portocarrero Mendoza (1681–1760), Spanish cardinal marquis
- Joaquín Fernández Prida (1863–1942), Spanish lawyer and politician
- Joaquín Fernández Fernández (1891–1979), Chilean diplomat and politician
- Joaquín Fernández (swimmer) (born 1971), Spanish swimmer
- Joaquín Fernández de Piérola Marín (born 1974), Spanish businessman
- Joaquín Fernández (footballer, born 1996), Spanish footballer
- Joaquín Fernández (footballer, born 1999), Uruguayan footballer
