= Sevilla Tower =

Skyscraper in Seville, Spain

Coordinates: 37°23′31″N 6°00′35″W

- Torre Sevilla (Spanish)
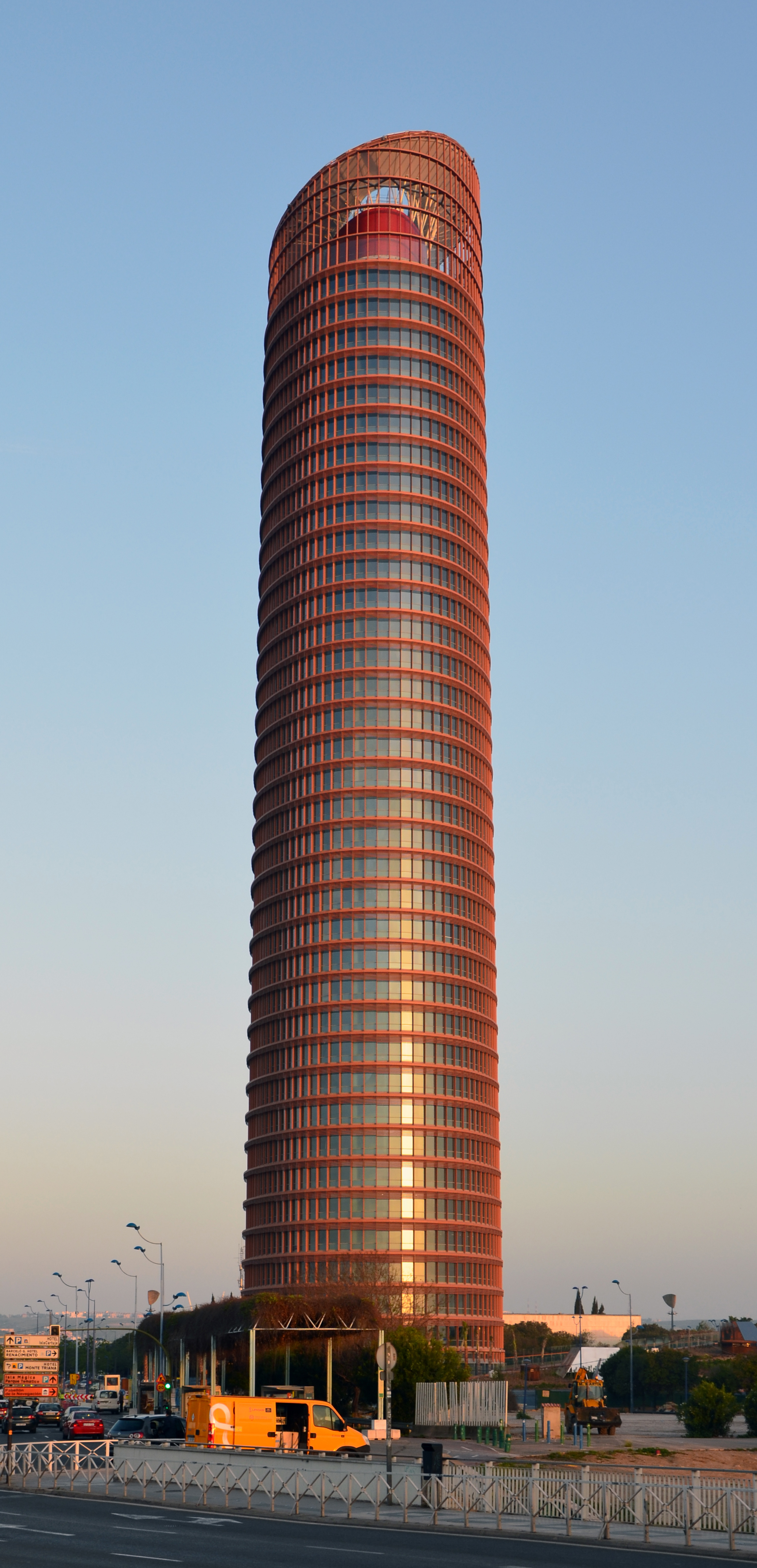
- The tower in April 2015
- Interactive map of the Sevilla Tower area
- Former names: Caja Sol Tower, Pellli Tower

General information
- Status: Completed
- Type: Office
- Location: Seville, Spain
- Construction started: 2008
- Completed: 2015
- Owner: CaixaBank (La Caixa)

Height
- Roof: 180.5 m (592 ft)
- Top floor: 157.2 m (516 ft)

Technical details
- Floor count: 40 (3 basement floors)
- Floor area: 68,000 m^{2} (732,000 sq ft)
- Lifts/elevators: 13

Design and construction
- Architects: César Pelli (Pelli Clarke Pelli Architects)
- Main contractor: FCC & Abengoa

Website
- Official website

The Sevilla Tower (Spanish: Torre Sevilla), known until 2015 as the Pelli Tower, is an office skyscraper in Seville, Spain. Its construction started in March 2008 and was completed in 2015. The stands at 180.5 metres (592 ft) tall and has 40 floors. It is an office building, with the entrance to the tower located off Odiel street. The tower is the tallest building in Andalusia and in the city of Seville, and the eighth tallest in Spain. It provides a panoramic view on all Seville.

The tower is located in La Cartuja, the former zone of the Universal Exposition that took place in Seville between April and October 1992. It is located next to the river in an area being redeveloped since the early 2000s. The tower is flanked by two four story podium buildings also designed by César Pelli. The curved edges of the podium buildings define a plaza that opens on the north and south and narrows at the center, creating a pedestrian-scaled commercial street.

The tower notably hosts a 5-star hotel, Eurostars Torre Sevilla, along with various offices.

== History ==
=== Location ===
In 2010, the works were awarded to a temporary joint venture of the construction company FCC (80%) and Inabensa (20%), a subsidiary of Abengoa. In the same year, the construction of the two podium buildings was awarded to the company Isolux Corsan. In 2013, CaixaBank awarded the completion works to the company Dragados. The façade has been installed by the company Inasus.

The tower began housing offices in 2015, its adjoining shopping center opened in September 2018, and the hotel located on the upper floors of the tower was inaugurated one month later in October. The CaixaForum opened in 2017.

=== Project ===
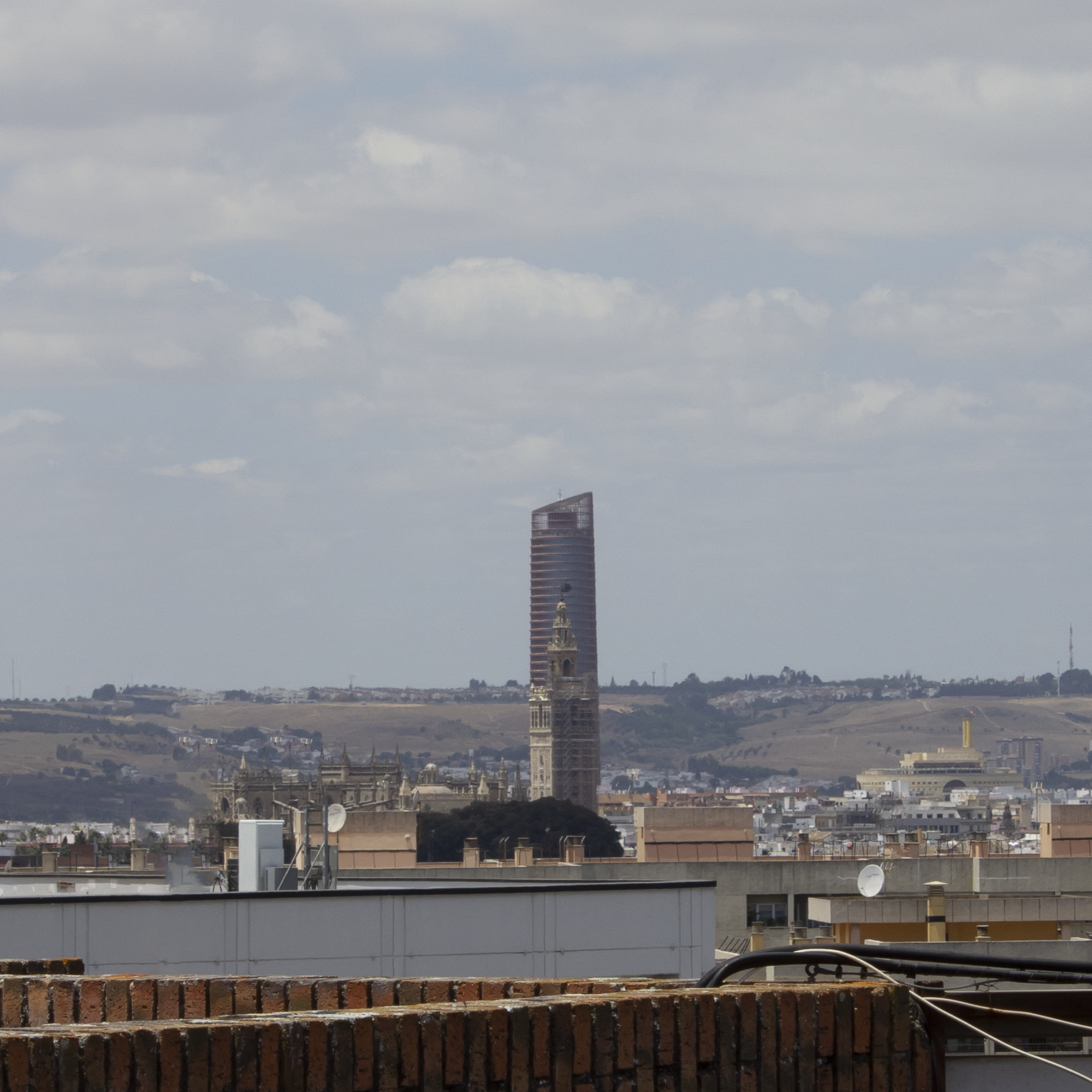
Height comparison of Giralda and Sevilla Tower.

The project's origins date back to the 1990s, during Soledad Becerril's term as mayor. In May 1999, the City Council of Seville approved an agreement between the City Council, the General Directorate of Heritage of the Regional Government of Andalusia, the Puerto Triana Company, and Agesa (the State Asset Management Company responsible for managing the assets of the 1992 Universal Exposition) to develop an urban project in the southern part of the Isla de La Cartuja. The proposal included the construction of a shopping center of almost 73,000 square meters, 15,000 square meters of offices and a hotel, and another 25,000 square meters for public facilities, in addition to the improvement of 181,579 square meters of public spaces. The Canadian company TrizecHahn expressed interest in carrying out the project and was to contribute 16 billion pesetas. The investors hired the Catalan architect Ricardo Bofill Leví for the project, who proposed a glass tower.

The site was previously occupied by the Pavilion of Discoveries, which had been destroyed by fire in February 1992. When Agesa agreed to demolish the pavilion, the artist Eduardo Arroyo protested. In July 1999, Becerril lost the municipal elections and Alfredo Sánchez Monteseirín became mayor. The project was left unfinished, and in 2000 the company TrizecHahn abandoned the project.

In 2001, the savings banks of Seville decided that Puerto Triana would be a good location for the future Caja Única (single savings bank) they intended to create. However, the political ties of the savings banks, coupled with the fact that the Mayor's office and the Urban Planning department belonged to different parties, and tensions with the Regional Ministry of Public Works of the Andalusian Government, broke the consensus on the project. The project was attempted again, this time with the Dutch multinational Rodamco managing the Puerto Triana company and with the mediation of the President of the Regional Government, José Rodríguez de la Borbolla. However, the company reduced the project's buildable area from 73,000 to 48,000 square meters, and Rodamco abandoned Puerto Triana in 2003 to make an investment in Valencia.

In 2005, the demolition of the Discoveries Pavilion was agreed upon. With a new General Urban Development Plan (PGOU), approved on July 19, 2006, the city faced major architectural changes. In Puerto Triana, this fact was reflected in an invitation to five leading international firms to compete in an ideas competition. The main requirement was that the building should be a new icon for the city and, "preferably," should concentrate the building's volume into a single high-rise structure.

The five architectural firms that submitted projects in November 2006 were: Pelli Clarke Pelli, by the Argentine architect César Pelli, which won the competition with its 180.5 m tower; Arquitectónica, by the Peruvian architect Bernardo Fort Brescia which was a finalist with a flat tower of 225 m; FOA-Zaera, by the Spaniard Alejandro Zaera-Polo, which came in third with a ceramic tower of 187 m; and the firms of the Japanese architect Arata Isozaki and the French firm Valode & Pistre, which did not pass the first round with towers of 220 and 120 meters respectively. The decision was made in January 2007.

The General Urban Development Plan (PGOU) does not include projects proposing buildings taller than eleven or twelve stories in consolidated urban areas, and in unconsolidated urban areas, the construction of taller buildings depends on development plans. In this case, there are projects for three other skyscrapers in the city: one on the site of the former Cruzcampo factory, with 16 stories; another in the Hytasal area, with 28 stories; and a third next to the Bellavista boulevard, with 30 stories.

=== Name ===
The skyscraper was unofficially called Torre Cajasol at first, and after the dissolution of that bank, Torre Pelli, because both the tower and the shopping center were designed by César Pelli. The construction project is now complete and was developed by the public limited company Puerto Triana, currently controlled by CaixaBank. The tower has two lower buildings to the north with a central street. The building's name in the architect's studio was always Torre Sevilla. In May 2015, CaixaBank officially named the skyscraper Torre Sevilla.

=== Design ===
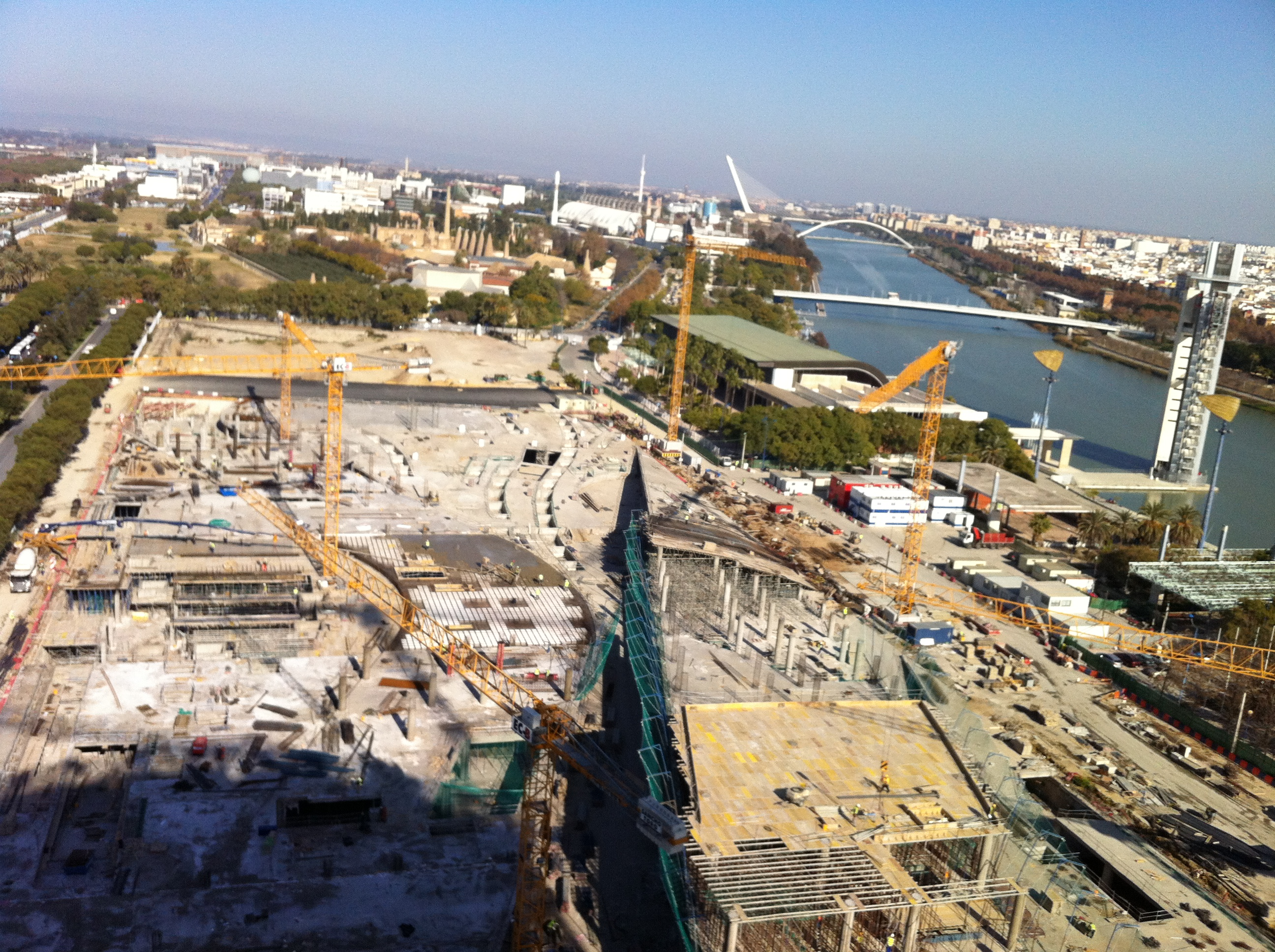
The construction site seen from the tower

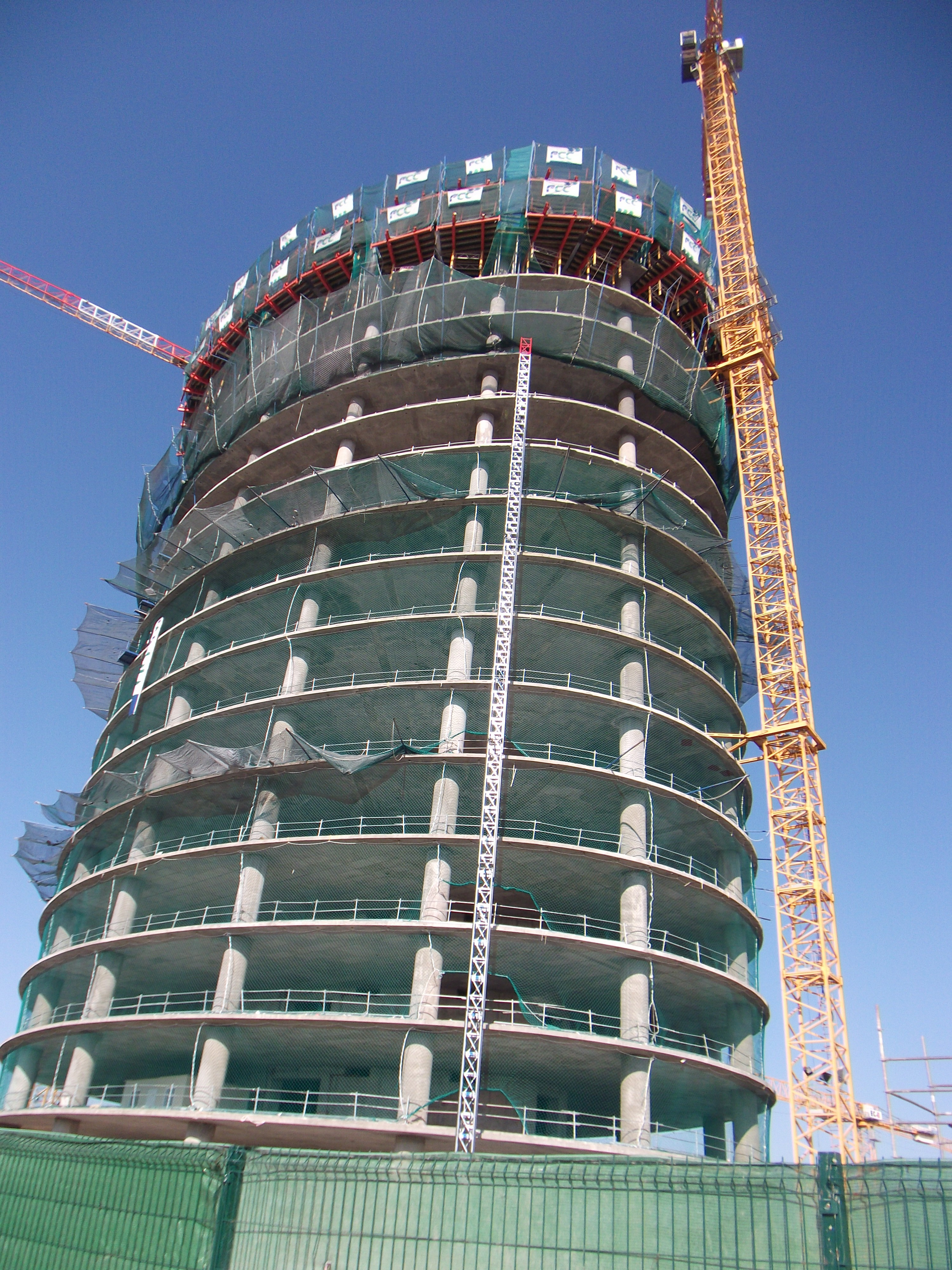
The tower in January 2012

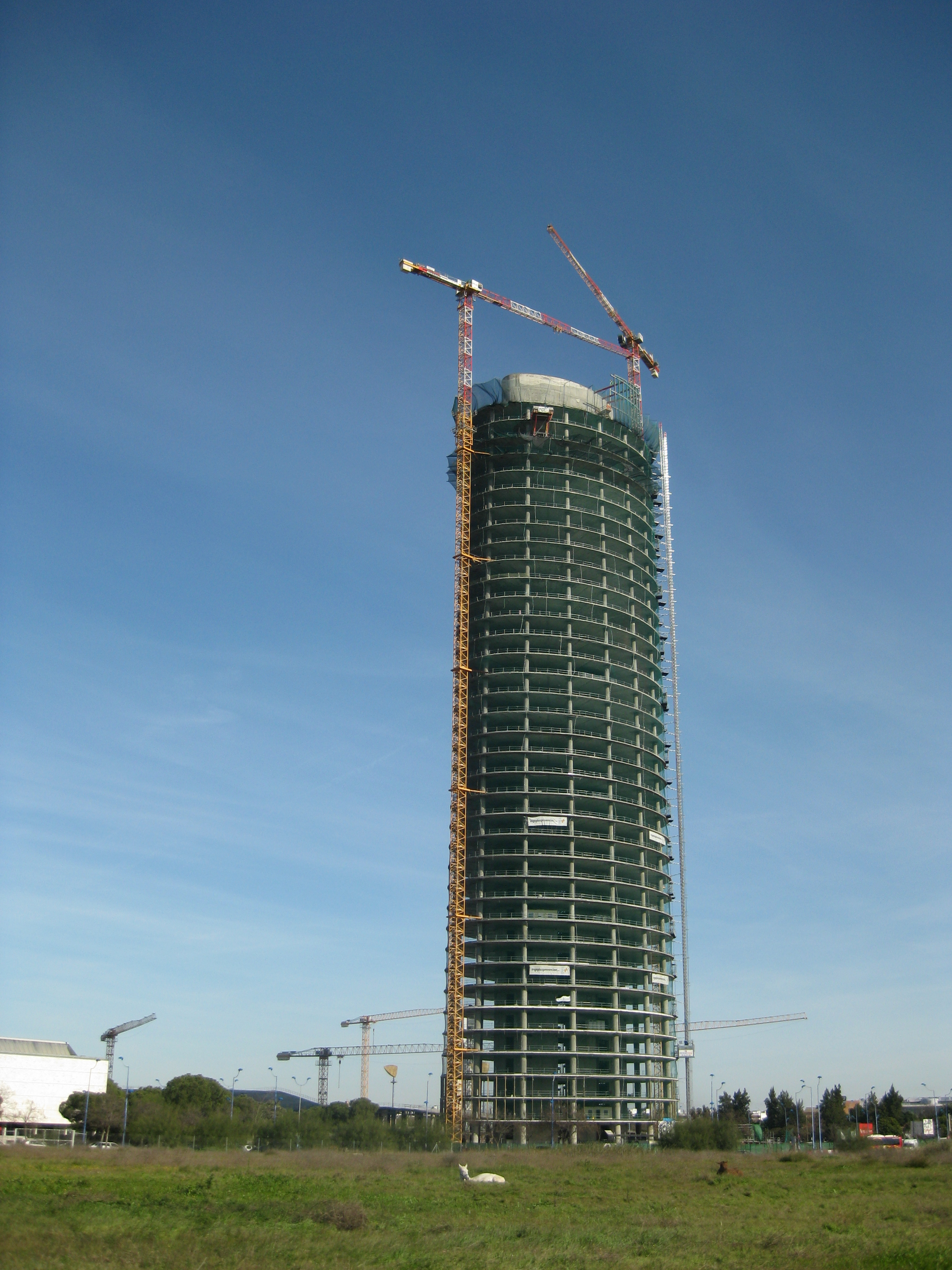
The tower in January 2013

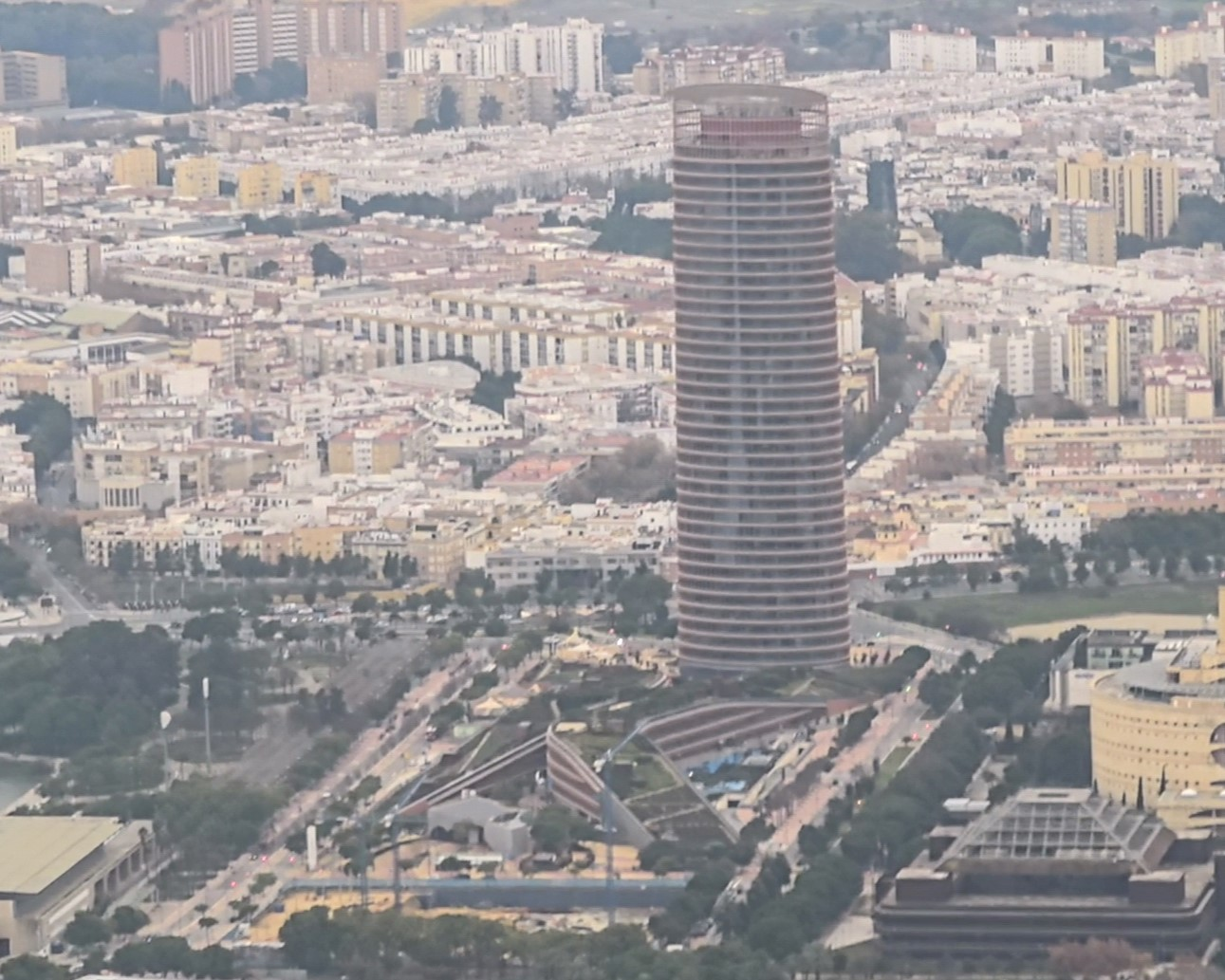
Aerial view of the tower in 2025

The tower was designed by the Argentine architect César Pelli and was completed in 2015. Part of the same complex is a shopping center and the CaixaForum, designed by Guillermo Vázquez Consuegra, completed in 2017. With 43 floors, and a structure made mostly of concrete and glass, the tower has an elliptical shape and is illuminated at night.

The tower has a home automation system managed by Siemens. The building also obtained LEED Gold certification from the U.S. Green Building Council.

The complex is situated above an underground parking area with capacity for 3,066 cars and 400 motorcycles.

The roofs of commercial buildings are landscaped, which also serves as natural thermal insulation. The top of the building has photovoltaic panels.

The building has louvers that act as sunshades. Originally, ceramic louvers were planned, but in 2014 it was decided to use terracotta-colored aluminum for the roof. The upper part has photovoltaic panels.

== Controversies ==
It had been reported that UNESCO was considering putting the Seville's monuments which are classified as World Heritage Sites (the Cathedral, Alcazar and Archivo de Indias) into the "Threatened List", because of the tower's "negative visual impact" on the old town skyline of Seville. UNESCO went so far as to ask the city to reduce the tower's height, but city officials ignored the requests. The proposal was rejected at the meeting of the UNESCO World Heritage Committee in Saint Petersburg in 2012 but the meeting regretted that work on the tower had not been suspended, as requested by the Committee at its previous session, and that no discussions or consultations had been undertaken to consider how the project could be improved and any possible impact further reduced.

Historically, Seville, with the exception of the Giralda, had only had low-rise buildings. The city's skyline, with its low buildings and the cathedral rising above them, was painted several times during the Golden Age, by both Spanish and foreign artists.

In the 1920s, the Real Academia de Bellas Artes de Santa Isabel de Hungría had already complained about the great height of the two 74-meter towers in the Plaza de España. Over the years, talk even arose of an unwritten rule stating that no building in the city could exceed the height of the Giralda.

At the 1992 Universal Exposition, buildings taller than the Giralda were constructed, such as the Centenario Bridge and the Alamillo Bridge . When the Pelli Tower project, the city's first skyscraper, was announced, a public debate arose once again because, although the tower was located outside the historic center, 1.5 km from the Giralda, it could be argued that it would negatively impact the overall image of the city. The citizens' platform ¡Túmbala! (Tear it down!) spearheaded the opposition to the project, which was joined by other local institutions. Fernando Mendoza, a member of this platform, stated: "It is a vulgar and megalomaniacal tower that overwhelms the entire city, especially Triana. And it has no popular support".

These opinions were opposed to the project because they considered its construction an "attack" on Seville's historic landscape, insisting that its completion could lead to the inclusion of Seville's monuments certified as World Heritage Sites (the cathedral, the Alcázar of Seville, and the General Archive of the Indies) on the list of endangered heritage sites, and that it could in turn jeopardize the eventual listing of other monuments and sites in the Andalusian capital. This supposed threat was mentioned by UNESCO in some of its statements. A study published in the press in 2011 examined the visual impact the skyscraper would have from the city center and the river, noting that at street level and from the streets of the center it barely stood out, but the impact was much greater on the urban landscape from the terraces and from the river.

Due to the insistence of this group on including Seville on the List of World Heritage in Danger, at the 33rd Session of the UNESCO World Heritage Committee, held in the Andalusian capital itself in June 2009, the issue of the tower was included on the agenda. However, the organization merely reminded Spain that it had violated some of the regulations by failing to report on its construction, while also requesting that the works be halted. On June 29, 2010, a group of ICOMOS representatives visited the tower construction site to verify that work had not stopped, ignoring UNESCO's recommendations. According to Víctor Fernández Salinas, Deputy Secretary of ICOMOS-Spain, this would mean that "A realistic scenario is that Seville will be added to the list of cities with World Heritage in Danger after the Brasilia meeting. And it could happen that, in the worst case, they would expel Seville [...]". This hypothesis ultimately did not come to pass either at the meeting in Brasilia in 2010, or at the one in Paris that took place between July 19 and 29, 2011, where the organization merely requested a new report on the "progress of the works" of the tower and the "state of conservation" of the three properties that could ultimately be affected.

In 2012, the city's mayor, Juan Ignacio Zoido, traveled to St. Petersburg for the World Heritage Centre Assembly, where it was decided that the city's World Heritage sites (Alcázar, Archive of the Indies, and Cathedral) would not be included on the list of World Heritage in Danger, on the condition that the Seville City Council prevent the future construction of any more skyscrapers that would have a visual impact on the city's historic landscape.

Some citizens, as well as citizens' groups, supported the tower. José María Bascarán, president of the association sevillasemueve, stated: "Every time there is a new project in Seville, like the Prado Library or the Metropol Parasol (Las Setas de la Encarnación), a platform emerges to ensure nothing changes. [...] We support the project, which will generate activity in a city that needs it". This position also had defenders within the International Council on Monuments and Sites (ICOMOS), one of UNESCO's advisory bodies on historical heritage. ICOMOS spearheaded the report against the project and requested Seville's inclusion on the list of cities with endangered heritage sites. This is the case of the French urban planner George Zouain, former director of UNESCO World Heritage, who opined that "the impact of the tower will be positive," due to its position far from the city center.

César Pelli never feared for the project's viability, arguing that the tower could not endanger the city's heritage because it was located a great distance from the Giralda. He compared Seville to Paris, explaining that the French city's skyscraper district of La Défense did not diminish its beauty. Along the same lines, the city's mayor until 2011, Alfredo Sánchez Monteseirín, stated that "Seville does not need a skyscraper to be modern, but neither does it need to prevent the construction of a skyscraper to preserve its essence. These elements should not be opposed, as Seville has sufficient capacity and ambition to combine tradition and modernity".

In other matters, a debate arose about the potential increase in vehicle traffic that the tower could generate in that area of the city.

== Gallery ==
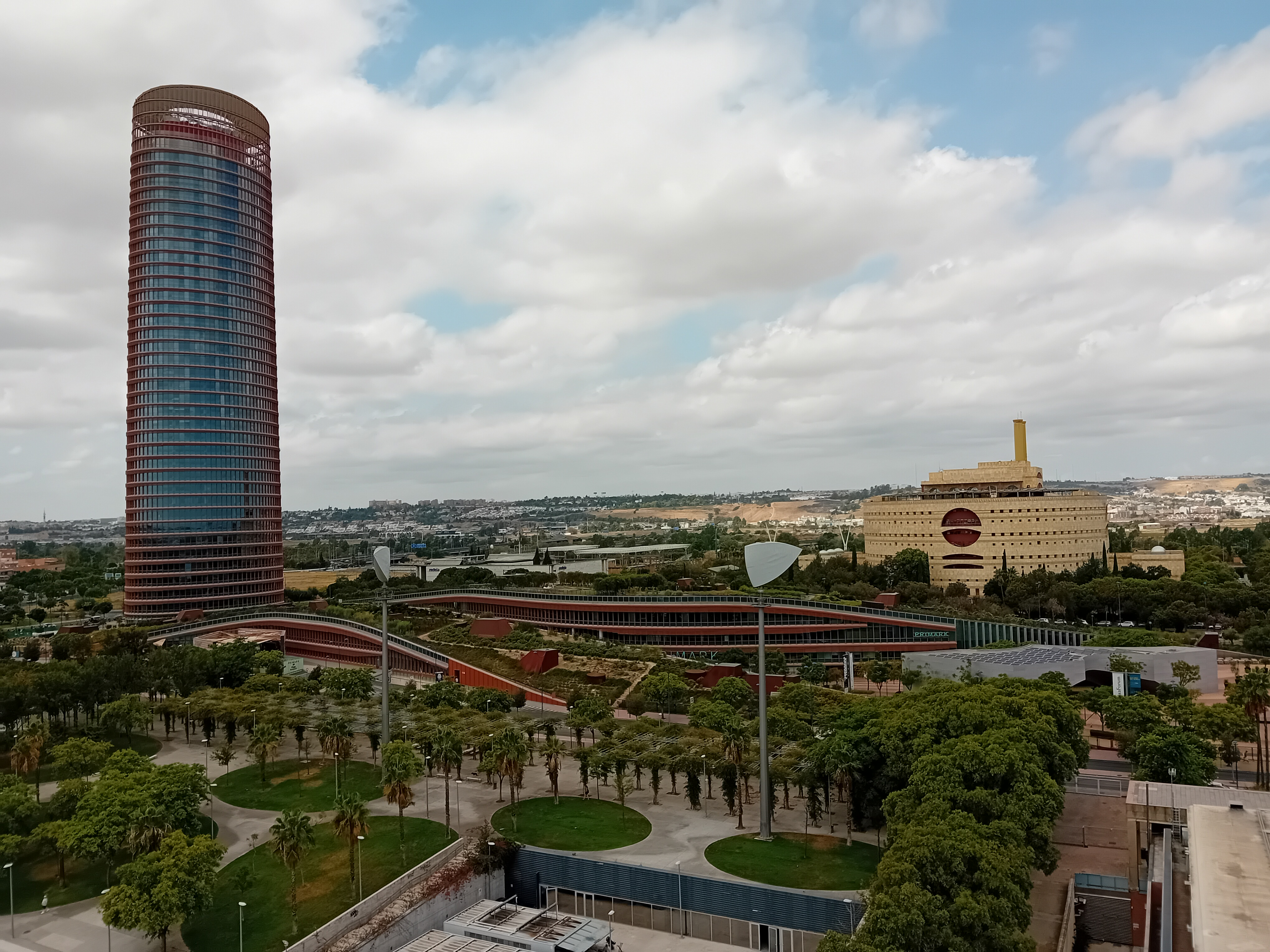
Torre Sevilla (left), Fernando de Magallanes Park (foreground) and the Triana Tower in the background.

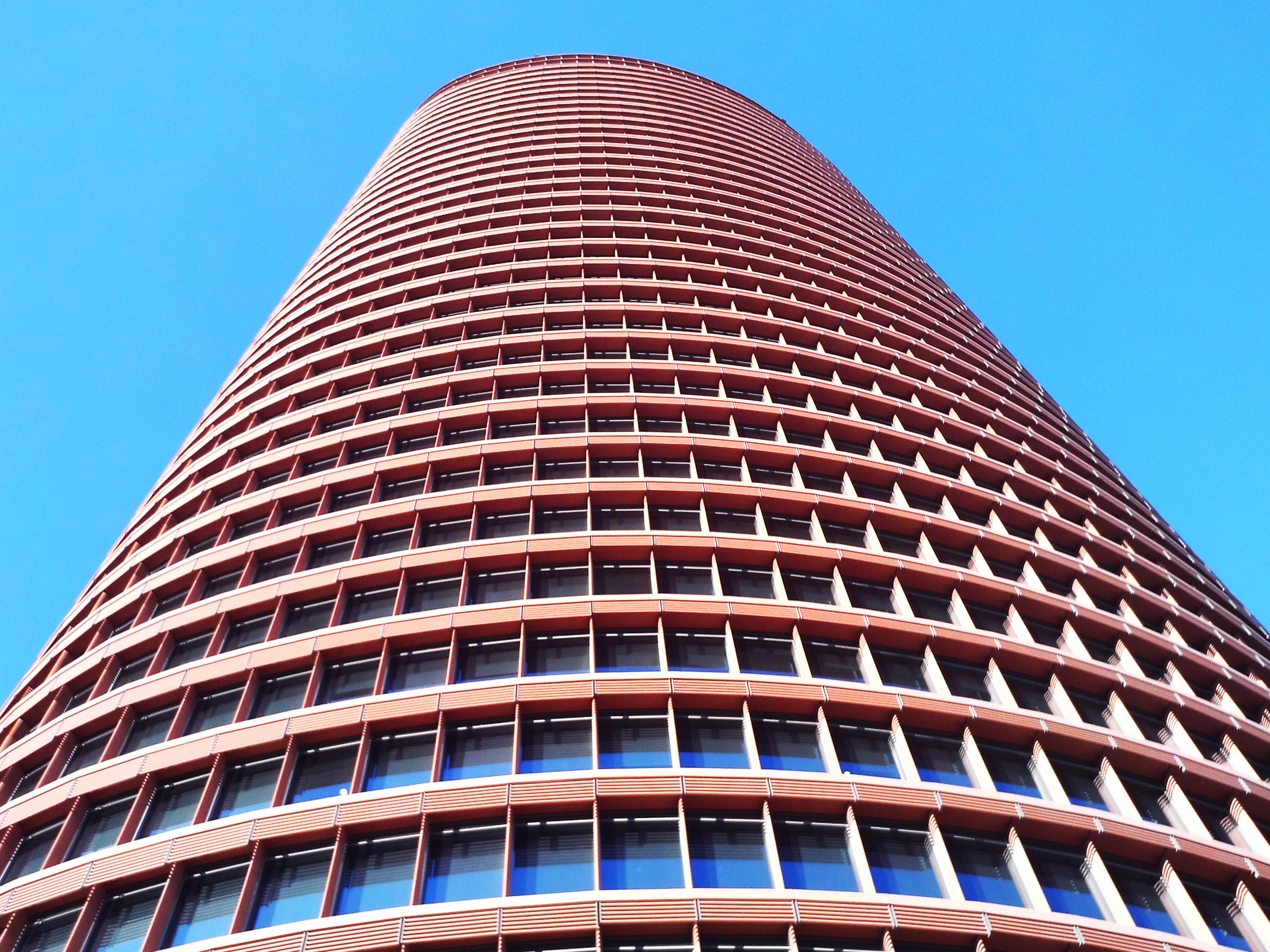
Facade detail

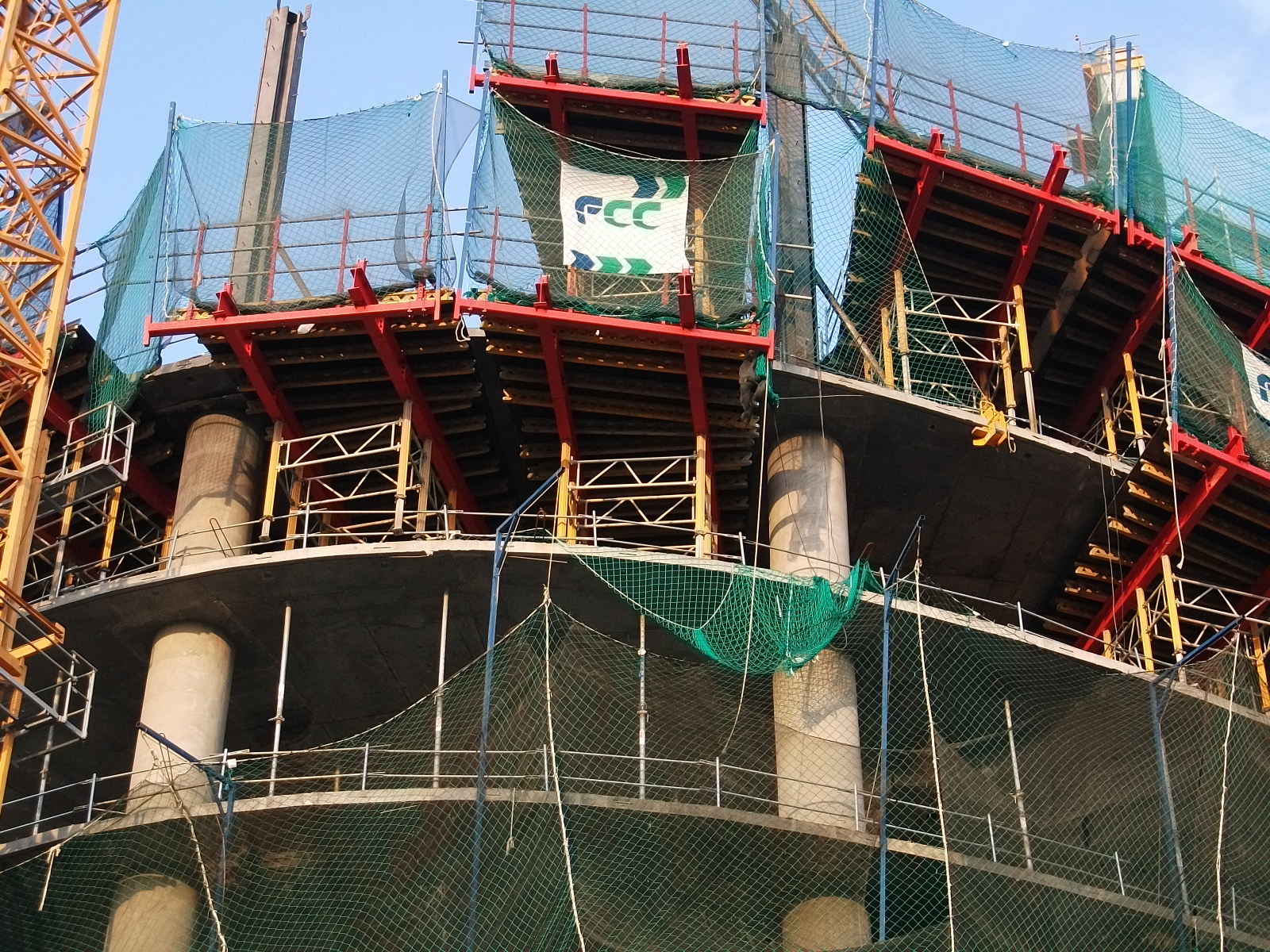
Structural detail

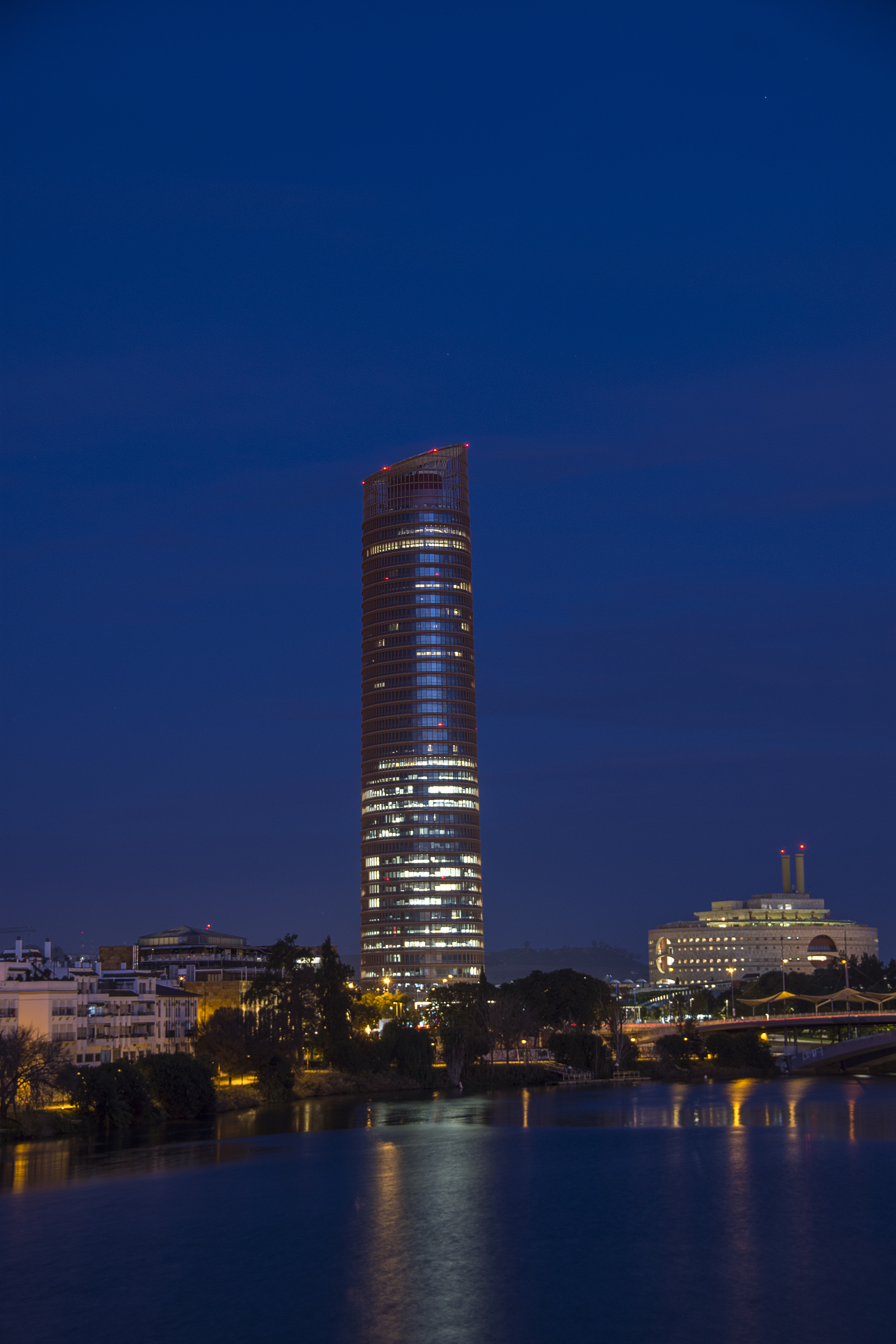
The tower during night time

== See also ==
- List of tallest buildings in Spain
