= Maryland Residence =

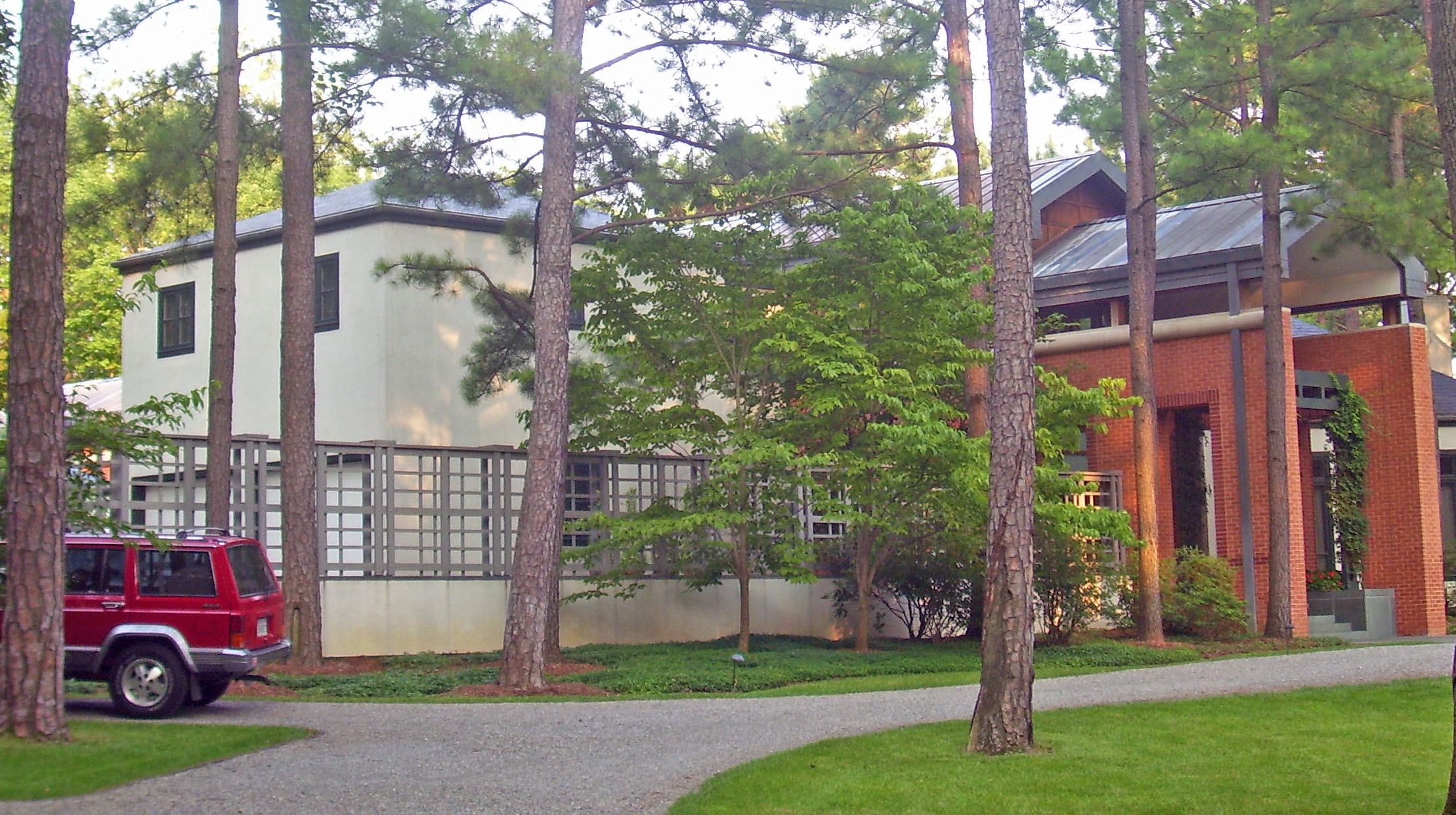
- West (front) profile and portion of north elevation, 2008
- Interactive map of the Maryland Residence area

General information
- Type: House
- Architectural style: Postmodern
- Location: Bethesda, MD, United States, Glenbrook Road
- Coordinates: 38°58′53″N 77°06′24″W
- Elevation: 300 feet (91 m)
- Construction started: 1987
- Completed: 1989

Technical details
- Floor area: 7,000 square feet (650 m^{2})

Design and construction
- Architect: César Pelli
- Architecture firm: Cesar Pelli & Associates
- Structural engineer: Spiegel & Zamecnik, Inc.
- Main contractor: E.A. Baker Co., Inc.
- Awards and prizes: 1989 Washington Building Congress Craftsmanship Award, Doors & Windows

The Maryland Residence is a private home in Bethesda, Maryland, United States, designed by César Pelli. Completed in 1989, it is one of the few houses by an architect known mainly for his large commercial projects. It takes the form of five small pavilions centrally connected. Pelli has described it as a complex.

Pelli began designing the house in 1985 for a client with a family of four. Construction began on the house in 1987 after an existing Colonial Revival home on the lot was demolished. It was completed in 1989. The general contractor, E.A. Baker Co., Inc., won a Craftmanship Award from the Washington Building Congress for their work on the doors and windows. Pelli donated some of his plans and sketches to the Library of Congress later.

It is situated on a large, slightly trapezoidal parcel on Glenbrook Road in a residential neighborhood of Bethesda within walking distance of downtown, at the corner of the unused Elm Street right-of-way. The lot was extensively landscaped during construction, and tall trees shield the home, set back from the street slightly with a semicircular driveway.

The one-and-a-half-story brick gallery runs east-west roughly 100 feet (30 m) in length. Pelli describes this section as the building's "central concept ... [I]t is the dominant space". At the entrance end is a wall of teak and opaque glass with trellis and French doors. It has a gently pitched gabled roof, which Pelli says "appears to be floating and acts as a clerestory to light the interior".

Two two-story stucco-faced hipped-roofed three-by-two bay pavilions project from the north. These are used as living spaces. The smaller pavilions on the south, which take the shapes of octagons and staggered squares, house the kitchen, living and dining rooms.
