= Mock interview =

Simulated job interview for training

A mock interview is an emulation of a job interview used for training purposes. The conversational exercise usually resembles a real interview as closely as possible, for the purpose of providing experience for a candidate. It can help a job applicant to understand what is expected in a real job interview, and can help an applicant to improve his or her self-presentation. Mock interviews can be videotaped; the candidate can view the tape afterward, and get feedback. There are coaches who can provide feedback on aspects of the interview process. Mock interviews are most common for job interviews, but may also be used to train public figures to handle interrogations by journalists, as well as help candidates for office prepare for debates. Some organizations schedule to help many students prepare for job interviews. For example, some schools have mock interview training days, often organized by career and guidance counselors. While the usual sense of the term is an exercise done as a form of preparation prior to applying for jobs, there is another sense of the term which describes a playful or non-serious interview. Mock interviews can help a person gain confidence for real interviews, as well as provide the interviewee with information about how to handle an upcoming interview.
