= Joaquín Fernández de Piérola Marín =

Joaquín Fernández de Piérola Marín is a Spanish businessman and the ex-CEO of Abengoa. Currently he is co-founder and Chairman of Zerintia HealthTech a company in the E-health sector. He holds degrees from the University of Zaragoza, University of West England, and the IESE Business School. He previously worked in the Spanish embassies located in Riyadh and Baghdad, as well as for Befesa.
