= Abengoa =

Spanish multinational company in the green infrastructure, energy and water sectors

Abengoa, S.A.

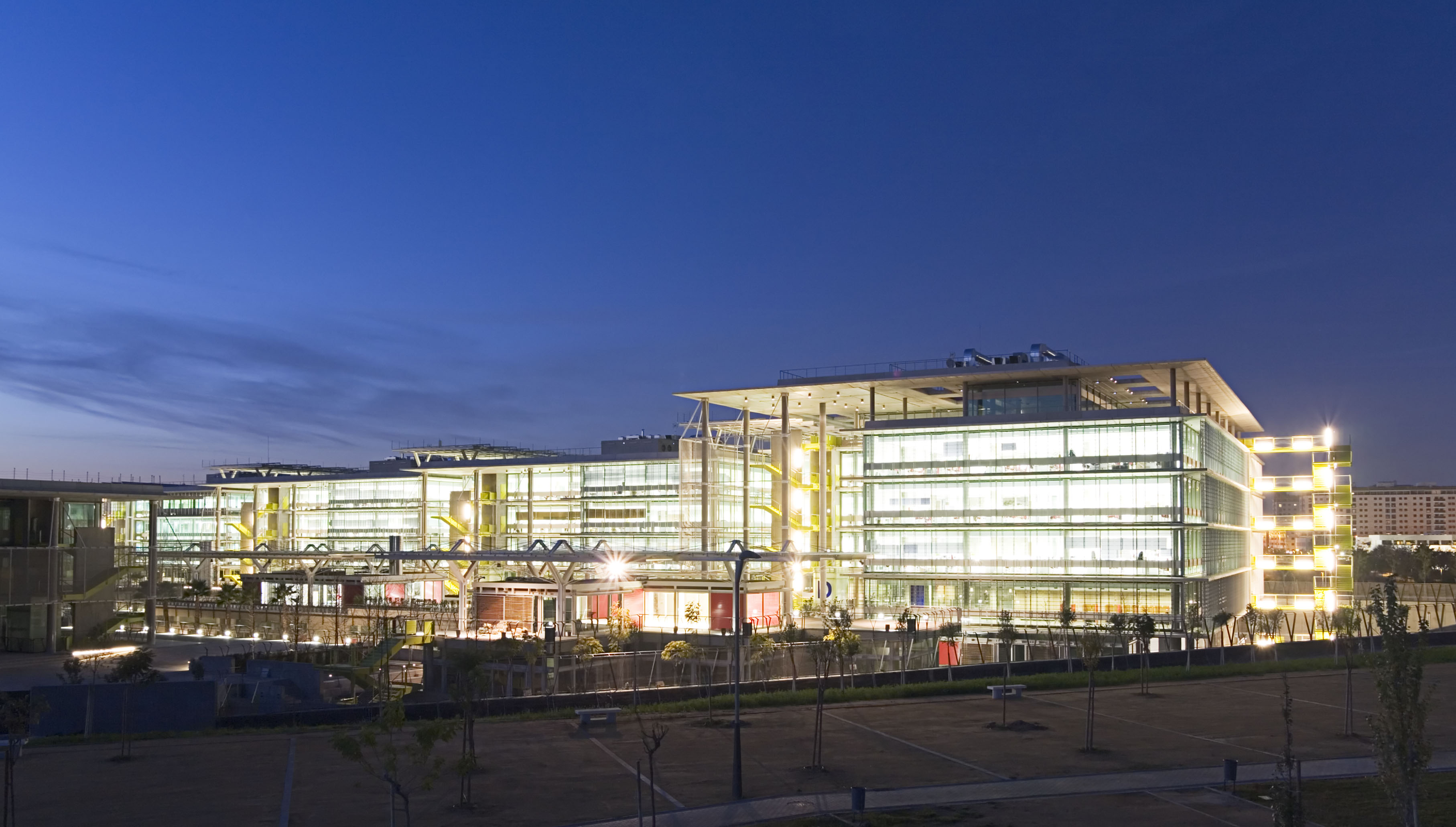
- Headquarters in Seville, Spain
- Type: Public
- Traded as: BMAD: ABG.P
- ISIN: ES0105200002
- Industry: Engineering & construction in the infrastructure, energy and water sectors.
- Founded: 1941; 85 years ago
- Defunct: July 1, 2022
- Headquarters: Seville, Spain
- Key people: Gonzalo Urquijo Fernández de Araoz (chairman); Joaquín Fernández de Piérola Marín (CEO)
- Products: Engineering & construction and Operation and maintenance services, among others
- Revenue: ▲€1.069 billion (as of 30th Sept 2019)
- Operating income: ▲€195 million (as of 30th Sept 2019)
- Number of employees: ▲15,260 (as of 30th Sept 2019)
- Website: abengoa.com

Abengoa, S.A. was a Spanish multinational company in the green infrastructure, energy and water sectors. The company was founded in 1941 by Javier Benjumea Puigcerver and José Manuel Abaurre Fernández-Pasalagua, and was based in Seville, Spain. Its current chairman is Gonzalo Urquijo Fernández de Araoz. After repeated bankruptcies and rescues, it declared insolvency in February 2021 amid various regulatory and financial charges against the board and management, the second-largest corporate collapse in Spanish history.

Abengoa invests in research in sustainable technology, and implements these technologies in Spain as well as exporting them globally. These technologies include concentrated solar power and desalination.

In 2014, Abengoa and subsidiaries employed approximately 20,250 people, operating in more than 80 countries.

== Origin ==
On 4 January 1941, Javier Benjumea Puigcerver and José Manuel Abaurre Fernández-Pasalagua, both engineers from the Instituto Católico de Artes e Industrias (ICAI), founded Sociedad Abengoa S.L. in Seville (Spain) with three friends and other family members, with an initial share capital of 180,000 pesetas. Their initial plan was to manufacture a five-ampere mono-phase meter, although the supply problems in Spain at that time meant that the project never got off the ground. But this fact, combined with significant opportunities that began to arise during this era, meant that from 1943 Abengoa began drafting projects and carrying out technical studies, as well as undertaking electrical assembly projects.

=== 2000 Bolivian Water Privatization, Rate Hike, and Violence ===
Bechtel and Abengoa formed a consortium named "Aguas del Tunari" (Water of Tunari - a local regional term) to file an unsolicited bid to the city of Cochabamba, Bolivia in 2000. Bechtel was a 27% partner and Abengoa S.A. was a 25% partner. This bid was in response to the increasing pressure from the World Bank, which had funded and extended water supply projects for the country of Bolivia, to privatize the water utility of Cochabamba. With the strings attached in 1995, and the World Bank participating in draft bids in 1997, Bechtel and the consortium introduced an unsolicited and unique bid. The bid was accepted, under pressure of the World Bank and the conditions of their loans to Bolivia. The terms were ratified in the often-cited Law 2029 by the legislative body of Bolivia, however largely it had previously been accepted and influenced by local governments. Under the terms, Bechtel and the consortium immediately raised water pricing 35% and then 20% after the first month. Water became one fifth of the average person's expenses and protests erupted. Protests were met with cold shoulder response by Bechtel expressing they would simply cut-off water to those who did not pay. Further protests were enhanced when agricultural sectors realized the bylaws allowed Bechtel and the consortium rights to rain water as well, which was assumed to mean they could no longer collect rain water. Violence between protesters and police resulted in burning of city governments and hundreds of injured within the first days of the conflict. The local governments of Manfred Reyes Villa (mayor) and Jose Pepe Orias (prefect or governor) quickly fled the arguments and disappeared and resigned (respectively), leaving the executive government of General Hugo Banzer Suarez to clean-up the mess. The contract was ultimately abandoned, for which Bechtel in February 2021 demanded settlement. The aftermath of the violence was destruction of public property in downtown Cochabamba paid for by taxpayers, death of (1) civilian restitution by the government, and hundreds of injured police, military, and protestors. A movie titled "Even the Rain" with acclaimed actor Diego Luna depicts a historical fiction story set in this time. For all the same references and further information, see the article Cochabamba Water War.

== Subsidiaries ==
=== Befesa ===
Befesa has been until 2013 an Abengoa subsidiary specializing in the integral management of industrial wastes and the generation and management of water.

=== Abengoa Solar ===
Abengoa began its involvement in the development of solar technologies in 1984 with the construction of the Solar Almería Platform in Spain.

In 2008, the US Department of Energy awarded Abengoa Solar two research and development projects in the field of Concentrating Solar Power (CSP) that total over $14 million. The goal of the R&D program is to develop CSP technologies that are competitive with conventional energy sources (grid parity) by 2015.

On July 3, 2010, US President Barack Obama announced that the US Department of Energy conditionally committed to offering a $1.45 billion loan guarantee to support construction by Abengoa Solar of the Solana Generating Station, in Maricopa County, Arizona. It is set to begin operation in 2013. (Operational Oct 2013)

The Mojave Solar Project in the Mojave desert in California entered commercial operation in 2014.

Abengoa are constructing three CSP plants in South Africa for Eskom, Khai (50 MW), Xina (100MW) and Kaxu (100 MW) Abengoa are also constructing a 400kV Transmission line for Eskom .

=== Telvent ===
Telvent was an Abengoa subsidiary focused on information technology consulting and industrial automation. It was formed in 2003 by the merger of other subsidiaries of Telvent related to IT and industrial control, the oldest one being Sainco founded in 1963. It was listed on NASDAQ until its sale in 2011 to Schneider Electric. In 2014 was bought and integrated into Getronics.

== Abengoa Bioenergy ==
Abengoa Bioenergy is a global biotechnology company specializing in the development of new technologies in producing biofuels and biochemicals and promoting sustainability of raw materials.

AB constructed a biomass-to-ethanol facility in Hugoton, Kansas that produced second generation biofuels. The refinery went online and it was full production by 2014. It was operated by Abengoa Bioenergy Biomass of Kansas, a company of Abengoa Bioenergy. The Hugoton plant never did reach production level and was shuttered as a failure in 2015. The project was heavily criticized as yet another fleecing of the American taxpayer.

Abengoa Bioenergy also has a joint venture biofuel plant with Ebro Puleva.

=== Feedstocks ===
The feedstock comprises woody and non-woody cellulosic biomass provided by plant biomass, agricultural wastes, forestry residues, and sugar processing residues. Currently the most important grain cereal for production of bioethanol in Abengoa Bioenergy's plants are wheat, barley, corn and sorghum. In Abengoa Bioenergy Brazil, the company grows sugarcane while maintaining sustainable rural development methods, biodiversity, and regional economic growth. Other plants produce second-generation bioethanol from a combination of corn stover, wheat straw, oat straw, barley straw, hardwood, switchgrass. Converting starch from cereals through fermentation creates a high protein co-product that is a source of vegetable protein, energy, fiber and vitamins, and is used to produce cattle feed.

=== Pre-treatment ===
Lignocellulosic raw material is first milled and cleaned before pre-treatment. Pre-treatment consists of contacting the cellulosic biomass feedstock with an acidic liquid medium to form an acid-impregnated biomass feedstock, then contacting the feedstock with H_{2}O at elevated temperature and pressure to solubilize hemicellulose resulting in a steam treated feedstock. The biomass is then subjected to a depressurization zone to further solubilize hemicellulose and producing a volatilized fraction. Temperature and pressure within the depressurization zone is controlled by releasing a portion of the volatilized fraction.

==== Acid Impregnation ====
Acid impregnation prepares the feedstock for enzymatic hydrolysis to produce fermentable sugars by increasing bioavailability of feedstock. Feedstock is introduced to an acid impregnation vessel consisting of hydrochloric acid, sulfuric acid, sulfurous acid, sulfur dioxide, nitric acid, and combinations thereof. The acidic liquid medium contains an acid concentration of less than 5 wt %. Acid impregnation involves soaking or spraying the liquid medium to the feedstock. Either method involves agitation or mixing for 1–13 minutes to promote dispersion of the acid throughout the feedstock. Impregnation of feedstock results in degradation of fibers as the hold time and temperature reach certain limits.

===== Soaking =====
When soaking, the entire mass of feedstock is submerged in acidic liquid medium to promote bulk movement of the feedstock to provide dynamic and continuous contact of the feedstock and acidic liquid medium. To promote dynamic physical contact and dispersion of the acidic liquid medium to feedstock, the feedstock/acidic liquid medium slurry is agitated. Soaked biomass feedstock is dewatered to reduce its moisture content.

===== Spraying =====
Less acidic liquid medium is used so material costs are reduced, and avoids the need for dewatering. The feedstock is agitated to disperse the acid throughout the feedstock.

===== Wetting agent =====
Acidic liquid medium may include a surfactant to promote dispersion of acid throughout the resulting acid-impregnated biomass slurry by reducing surface tension of the liquid medium. Suitable surfactants are bio-degradable, non-toxic, and are commercially available. Nonionic surfactants are preferred as their performance is unaffected by the presence of an acidic liquid medium, such as alcohols.

Heating during acid impregnation is also employed to promote dispersion of acid throughout the resulting acid impregnated biomass slurry. The biomass feedstock/dilute acid mixture is heated to temperatures of at least 10-40C. However, heating at this stage does not significantly solubilize hemicellulose component. Instead it is used to minimize and avoid solubilization of hemicellulose. The feedstock is heated in a low moisture environment of a relative humidity of less than 80-100% (specifically, less than 50-70 wt %). Moisture inhibits the dispersion of acid throughout the feedstock, or results in an uneven acid dispersion. Low moisture content of acid-impregnated feedstock reduces the energy required during subsequent heating.

Acid impregnated feedstock results in a slurry with biomass solids dispersed throughout the acidic liquid medium with total solids of at least 25 wt% (0.35 - 0.65 g solids per g wet mixture). Temperature of the acid-impregnated biomass becomes the same as the acidic liquid medium (20-95C). Additionally the pH of the acid-impregnated biomass becomes less than 4. Total glucan content of acid-impregnated feedstock is about 25-50%.

==== Steam Treatment (Steam Explosion) ====
After acid-impregnation, the feedstock is subjected to elevated temperature and pressure in the presence of H_{2}O, then discharged to an environment of reduced pressure to break down the cellulose-hemicellulose-lignin complex. Steam treatment dissociates cellulose from hemicellulose and lignin for enzymatic hydrolysis to produce fermentable sugars. Steam is introduced at a pressure of at least 75-150 psig. The acid-impregnated feedstock and H_{2}O are introduced into the same vessel under a pressure of about 75-250 psig.

Temperature of steam is about 160-220C. Uniform moisture from the water vapor of steam treatment, promotes uniform temperature of the feedstock. To promote even temperature distribution throughout the vessel, the total solids content of the feedstock is maintained from about 30-70 wt % by direct steam injection as higher moisture feedstocks hinders steam penetration and heat transfer throughout the feedstock. If necessary, feedstock may be dewatered by removing excess acidic liquid medium using a mechanical solid/liquid separation device such as a dewatering screw press.

The abrupt change in pressure by withdrawing or removing the pretreated feedstock to a vessel of reduced pressure (above atmospheric pressure) degrades the lignin-hemicellulose-cellulose complex. To maintain adequate and rapid depressurization for effective degradation of fiber structures, the pressure at the outlet differs by less than 50-100 psig.

Steam treatment reduces the size of particulate solids of the acid-impregnated feedstock to provide an increase in exposed surface area of cellulose and/or hemicellulose for enzymatic hydrolysis.

=== Enzyme Supplier ===
Dyadic International is a global biotechnology company focused on the discovery, development, manufacturing, and sale of enzyme and protein products for bioenergy, biochemical, biopharmaceutical and industrial enzyme industries. Dyadic utilizes its patented C1 fungus to develop and manufacture low cost proteins and enzymes for diverse market opportunities. Dyadic actively pursues licensing arrangements and other commercial opportunities to leverage the value of their technologies by providing its partners with the benefits of manufacturing and/or utilizing the enzymes which these technologies help produce.

Dyadic's license agreement with Abengoa Bioenergy gives them the right to use Dyadic's C1 platform technology to develop, manufacture and sell enzymes for use in second generation biorefining processes to convert biomass into sugars for the production of fuels.

C1 is based on the Myceliopthora thermophila fungal expression system for gene discovery, expression, and production of enzymes and other proteins. Dyadic scientists have developed strains of this fungal microorganism to go from gene discovery to commercial manufacturing using the same host organism. It's integrated and patented C1 platform eliminates many of the bottlenecks of protein discovery, development, scale-up and commercialization. Thus, enabling new product introduction with less time, cost and risk.

DNA from various sources including individual organisms, environmental samples, or collections of genes can be fragmented and cloned into Dyadic's specialized C1 expression vectors. The resulting cultures are distributed into cultures and are allowed to grow to create a gene expression library. The collection can be further used to create replicates, or stored away for later use. The target protein are screened against the gene library. To make a commercially viable product, Dyadic researchers use the "C1 Express" Hyperproducing Protein Expression System to increase the expression level of the gene of interest. Because the same C1 organism is used for gene discovery and expression, the probability of successfully increasing the level of protein expression is very high.

Dyadic currently sells more than 55 enzyme products to more than 150 industrial customers in approximately 50 countries for a broad range of industries including biofuels, bio-based chemicals, biopharmaceuticals, animal health and nutrition, pulp and paper, textiles, food and beverage, and nutraceuticals.

=== Pilot Plants and Commercialization ===
==== York Pilot Plant (Nebraska, US) ====
Abengoa's biomass pilot plant opened in 2008 in York, Nebraska. This $35 million biomass facility will exclusively research and develop ethanol production processes using enzymatic hydrolysis and lignocellulosic biomass as a feedstock. The York facility will research and test proprietary technology for its commercial-scale facilities. The plant currently operates at 100% of its capacity and continues to demonstrate excellent efficiency and consistent operation. The York pilot plant uses an annual consumption of 520,000 tons of corn stover to produce 56 Mgal(210 ML) of bioethanol per year, through continuous batch cooking and fermenting process.

==== BCyL Demonstration Plant (Salamanca, Spain) ====
In 2009, the biomass plant Biocarburantes Castilla y León (BCyL) started operation as the first demonstration plant to process biomass-to-ethanol on a commercial scale. The plant produces 1.3 Mgal/year using wheat and barley straw biomass.

==== Hugoton Commercial Hybrid Biomass Plant (Kansas, US) ====
The construction of this commercial scale biorefinery facility by Abengoa Bioenergy Biomass of Kansas (ABBK) allowed them to use their proprietary technology that they developed over the last decade to produce cost-effective and renewable liquid fuel from plantfiber or cellulosic biomass. The plant produced 25 Mgal/year from 350, 000 tons of biomass/year. The residues of the biorefinery process were combusted with 300 tons/day of fry, raw biomass material to produce 18 megawatts of electricity to power the entire facility to make it energy efficient and environmentally friendly. The plant was in full production by 2014. The plant officially opened on October 17, 2014. The plant shut down its operation on December 10, 2015.

=== Abeinsa (Engineering and Construction) ===
Abeinsa is the branch of Abengoa responsible for engineering and construction. This company is consolidated Abener Engineering and Construction Services, Teyma, and Abacus Project Management.

== Financial difficulties ==
In January 2015, Abengoa announced it had raised $328 million from selling shares at its US division following further purchases of their stock from banks underwriting the offer.

In November 25, 2015 Abengoa started insolvency proceedings which could lead to Spain's largest bankruptcy on record, after a Gonvarri said it would not inject 350 million euros into the engineering and renewables company. In a 2016 effort to avoid bankruptcy, Abengoa is seeking to reduce its size by 30 percent by selling subsidiaries.

On February 15, 2016, a Nebraska grain dealer filed a petition to force Abengoa Bioenergy into bankruptcy so as to recover moneys owed to them for past corn deliveries.

On March 29, 2016, Abengoa filed for bankruptcy in the United States.

== Competitors ==
- CIE Automotive´s subsidiary Bionor (biodiesel)
- Ence
- Ferrostaal

== See also ==
- Concentrating solar power
- PS10 solar power tower
- PS20 solar power tower
- Solana solar power plant
- Telvent
