= West Philadelphia =

Neighborhood of Philadelphia, Pennsylvania

Coordinates: 39.975709°N 75.2129°W

- Neighborhood of Philadelphia
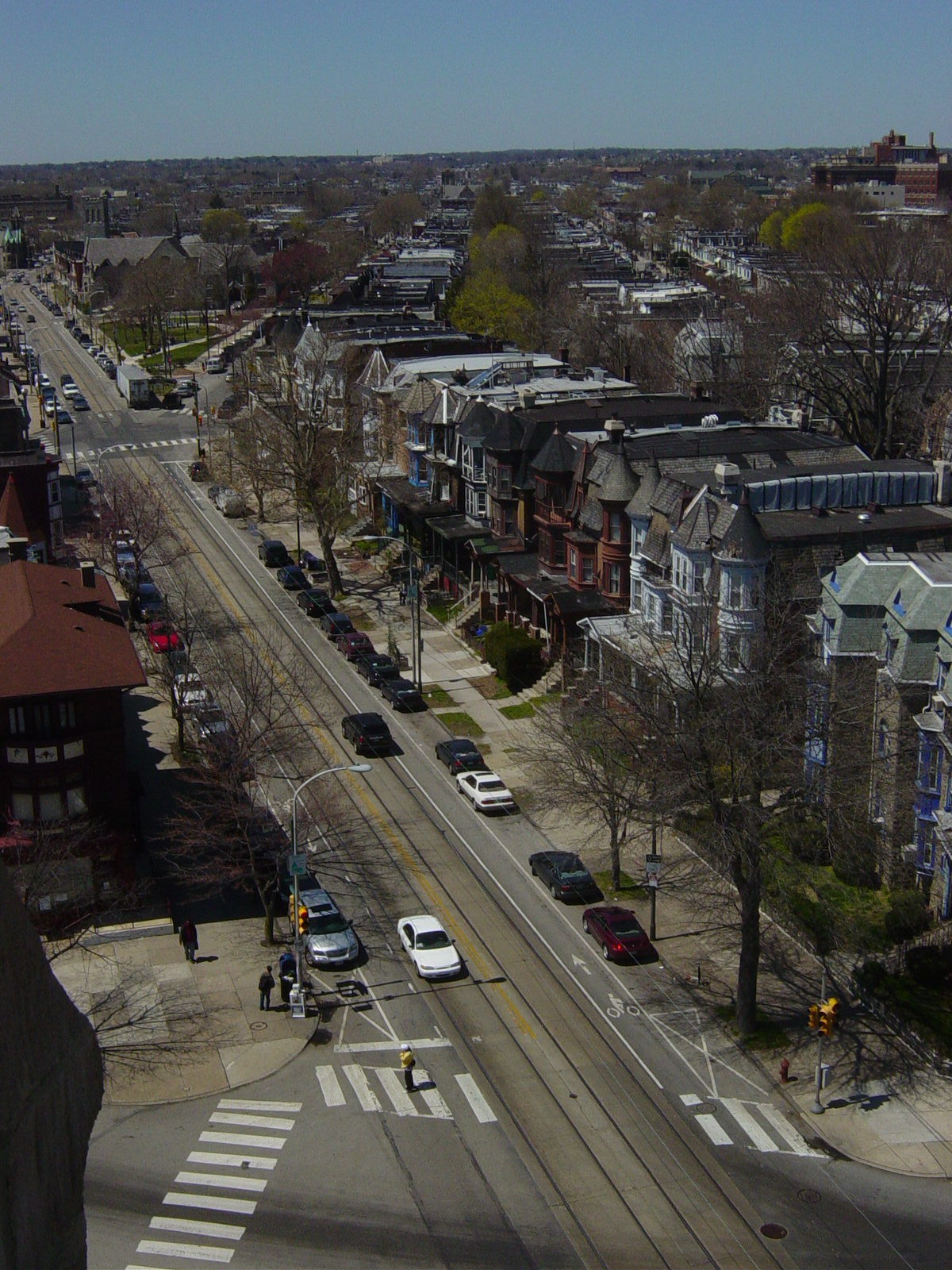
- West Philadelphia, looking west from Calvary United Methodist Church at 48th Street and Baltimore Pike
- Nickname: West Philly
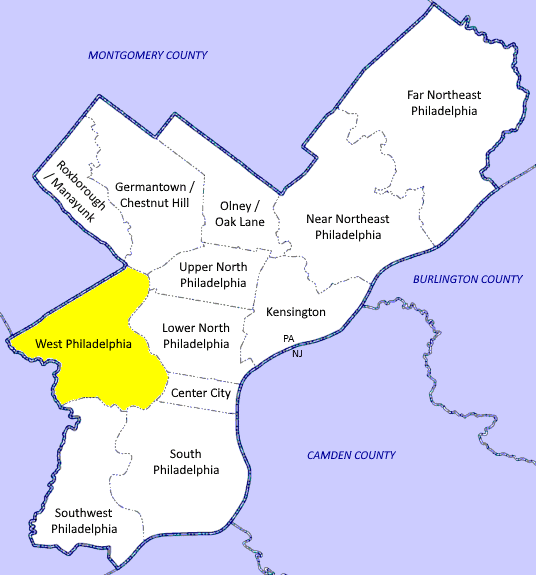
- A map showing West Philadelphia in relation to the rest of the city.
- Country: United States of America
- State: Pennsylvania
- County: Philadelphia
- City: Philadelphia

Area
  - Total: 14.2 sq mi (37 km^{2})

Population (2010)
  - Total: 216,433
  - Density: 11,233.6/sq mi (4,337.3/km^{2})

Demographics
  - White: 17.6%
  - Black: 68.9%
  - Native: 0.3%
  - Asian: 5.8%
  - Pacific Islander: 0.1%
  - Multiracial: 5.8%
  - Other: 1.5%
- ZIP Code: 19104, 19131, 19139, 19143, 19151

West Philadelphia, nicknamed West Philly, is a section of the city of Philadelphia. It has no officially defined boundaries, but is generally considered to be west of the Schuylkill River between City Avenue in the northwest, Cobbs Creek in the southwest, and the SEPTA Media/Wawa Line in the south. An alternate definition includes all city land west of the Schuylkill, thus including Southwest Philadelphia and its neighborhoods. The eastern side of West Philadelphia is also known as University City.

== Topography ==
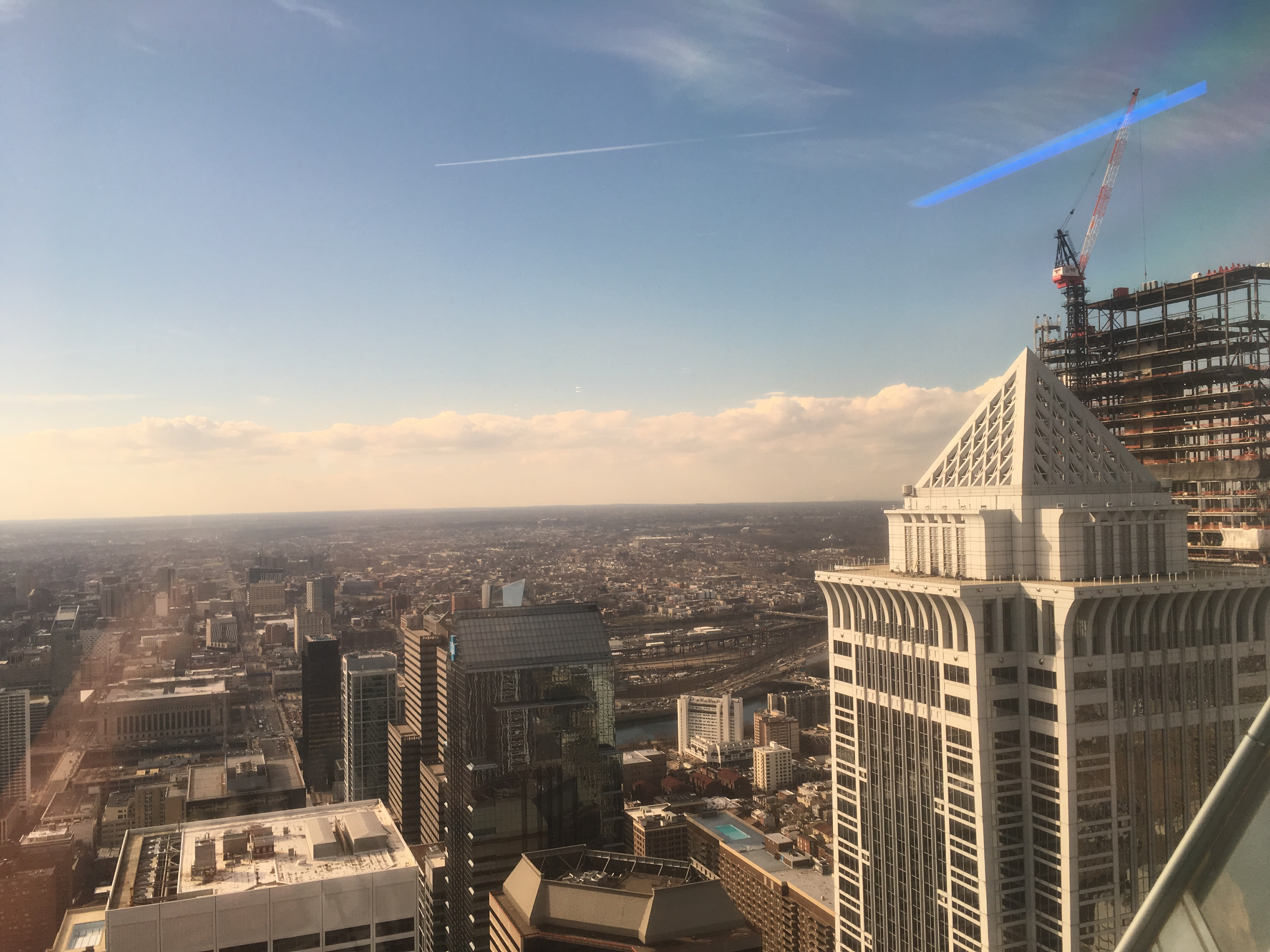
View of West Philadelphia from One Liberty Observation Deck in Center City Philadelphia

The topography of West Philadelphia is composed of rolling hills rising slowly from the Schuylkill River toward Cobbs Creek in the west and toward Belmont Plateau in the northwest. This gradual elevation makes the skyline of Center City visible from many points in West Philadelphia. The Wynnefield neighborhood is a location frequently used by photographers and organizers of civic events.

== Demographics ==
According to the 2010 census, 216,433 people live among the ZIP codes of 19104, 19131, 19139, 19143 and 19151. (Map)

=== Racial demographics ===
Starting with the first wave of Irish immigrants in the early 19th century, West Philadelphia was home to large numbers of European immigrants and their descendants. The area's African American population began growing in the 1880s through the migration of blacks from the Southern states; white flight in the early 1960s completed the transition to a majority-black population.

Since the 1980s, gentrification, immigration, and the Urban Indian relocation movement have brought more racial diversity. Arrivals from East Asia and Latin America, mainly Dominicans, Puerto Ricans, and Mexicans, have given the area small Hispanic and Asian American populations. The community has a significant number of Afro-Caribbean/Caribbean American residents from Jamaica, Haiti, Barbados, and other areas of the West Indies, as well as a growing number of African immigrants, ranging from West African immigrants (such as Nigerians) to East African immigrants (such as Ethiopians).

== History ==
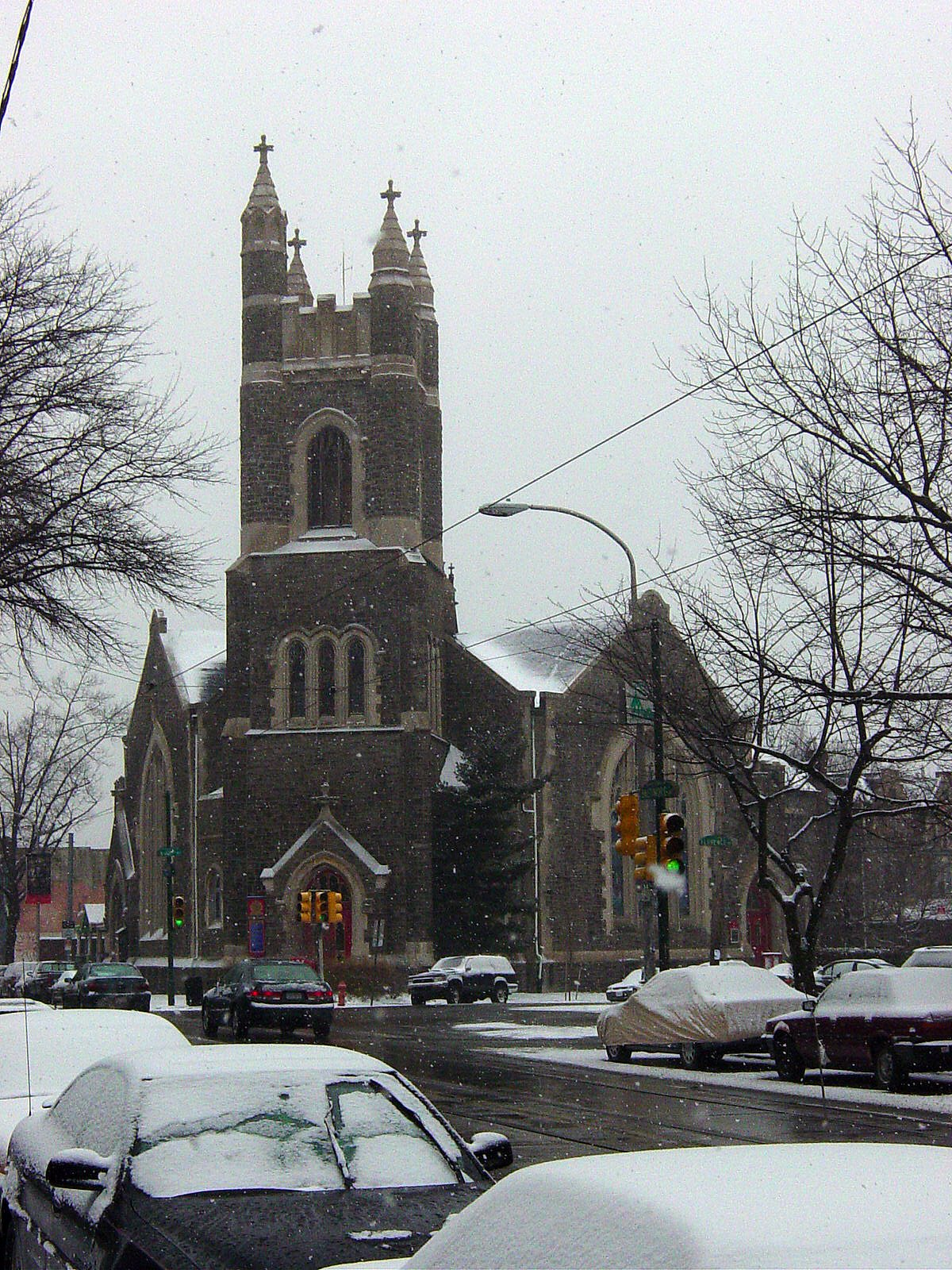
Calvary United Methodist Church, built in 1905, at 48th Street and Baltimore Avenue

The Woodlands, which is located near the west bank of the Schuylkill River, was originally the estate of Andrew Hamilton who bought the property in 1735 from descendants of Blockley Township's founder, William Warner, who hailed from Blockley, England. Warner was the first known European west of the Schuylkill. In 1840, the property was transformed into a cemetery with an arboretum of over 1,000 trees. It holds the graves of many famous Philadelphians.

Satterlee Hospital, one of the largest Union Army hospitals of the Civil War, operated from 1862 to 1865; part of its grounds are now the northern section of Clark Park.

West Philadelphia's population expanded in the late 19th and early 20th centuries, thanks in large part to horsecars, then streetcars, and Schuylkill River bridges that allowed middle-class breadwinners to commute into the Central Business District a few miles to the east. West Philadelphia was among the early streetcar suburbs, and a portion of it is listed on the National Register of Historic Places as the West Philadelphia Streetcar Suburb Historic District.

The western portion of the neighborhood was once home to some of the most expensive real estate in the country (and much striking Victorian-era architecture remains). The area has declined in prominence over the last 50 years, thanks in part to increasing crime and the migration of many middle and upper-class residents to suburbs and other sections of the city.

West Philadelphia drew national attention in 1978 and 1985 for violent clashes between police and an Afro-centric, back-to-nature group called MOVE. During the latter confrontation, police firebombed the group's headquarters, killing 11 people and destroying an entire block of Osage Avenue and Pine Street.

In recent years, parts of West Philadelphia have undergone "Penntrification," a term that reflects the University of Pennsylvania's role in gentrification of the neighborhood; including a campaign to rename part of the area University City (the designation now appears on maps as well as public street signs and government listings). Many young professionals and families have moved into the area.

In 2008, the area around the Please Touch Museum, Philadelphia Zoo, and the Mann Music Center was designated the Centennial District: an area to be revitalized by the country's 250th birthday in 2026.

In 2016, two development plans, 30th Street Station District and Schuylkill Yards, were announced, both in the easternmost part of West Philadelphia.

== Housing ==
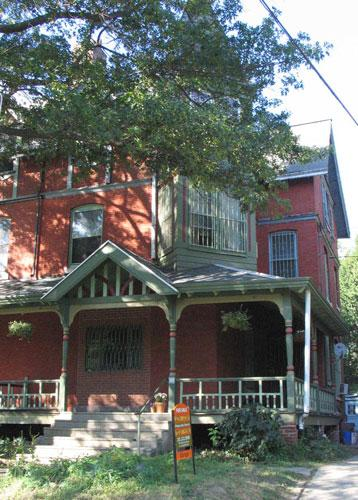
A common style of Queen Anne house with a wrap-around porch

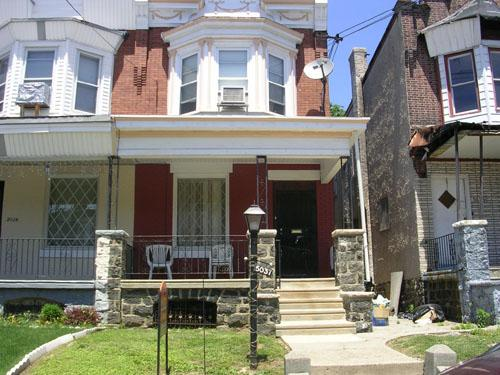
Twin rowhouse, typical of West Philadelphia neighborhoods

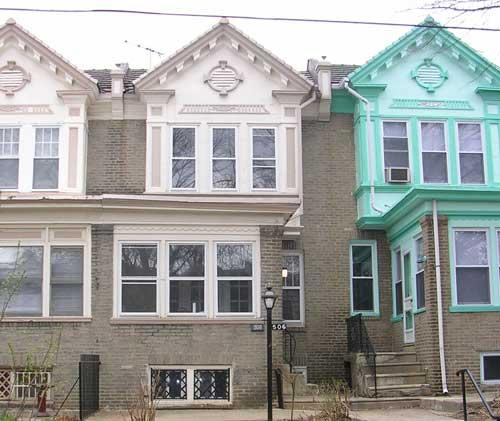
Multi-unit rowhouse, the most common style of rowhouse in West Philadelphia

Most of the houses in West Philadelphia are row houses, although there are areas of semi-detached and detached houses. The earliest developments began in 1850 and the final period of mass construction ended in 1930. Development was enabled by the creation of the horsecar, which pushed development to about 43rd Street, and, after the arrival of the electrified streetcar in 1892, accelerated to the west and southwest.

Largely commissioned by speculative developers and designed by some of the city's most prolific architects, they were purchased by industrial managers and other professionals who led the first movement of upper and middle class from the more crowded city center. Developers found they could increase profits by catering to this emerging group, shrinking lot sizes, and building more compact, less ornate houses.

Initial development was divided into block lots and sold in 1852 with the condition that "substantial stone or brick buildings" be erected. The houses in this grouping are primarily three-story Italianate buildings, linked by material, decorative detail, and form. An additional but smaller and less ornate 16 Italianate, brownstone, semi-detached houses, similar in form to the initial houses, were built around Chester Avenue. The setback of these houses was 25 feet, allowing generous front yards.

Another development on Locust Street, a project by banker and West Philly resident Clarence Howard Clark, comprised three-story, two-bay, brick, restrained Queen Anne rowhouses. The street was unified by front yards, and enclosed by decorative iron fences. The houses melded the suburban principles of front porches and greenspace with the urban rowhouse form, producing profitable, yet desirable, middle-class suburban housing.

Other developments introduced urban density and architectural uniformity: the Queen Anne style with columned porches and decorative spindlework, brickwork and corbelling; steeply pitched gables with fishscale slate shingles; turrets; balconies; and windows with a single pane surrounded by small panes. These houses are typical of the early 20th-century developments in West Philadelphia, and are unified by rhythmic patterning of porch and gable features. The second story, projecting, semi-hexagonal bay is incorporated into this design, an element which defines the later rowhouses.

The western reaches of West Philadelphia included miles of two-story rowhouses with bay windows above classical columned front porches. What resulted was a collection of Colonial Revival houses with Arts and Crafts influences, which reflect the sophisticated tastes of post-World War I Philadelphians. For the first time in West Philadelphia, houses had garages. Later Tudor and Spanish Revival houses, and the Art Deco influenced apartment houses also filled in available lot spaces between developments and made it possible for more middle-class Philadelphians to move to the area.

== Transportation ==
=== Rapid transit ===
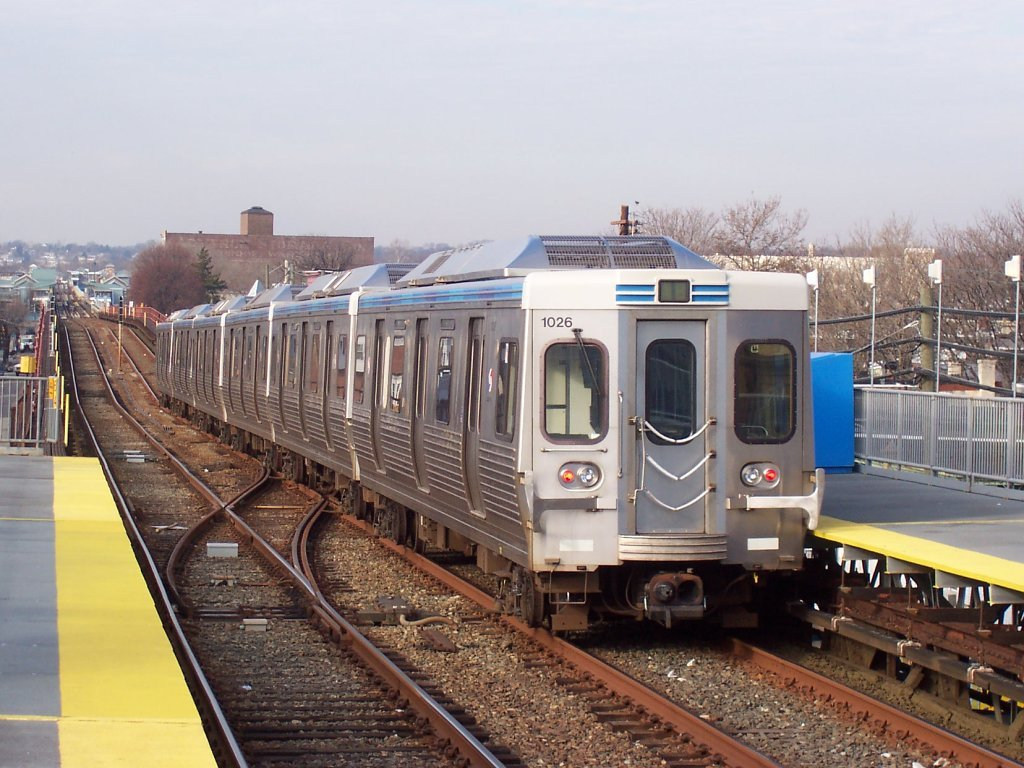
An "El" train headed westbound from 52nd Street station headed toward 69th Street Transportation Center

One of West Philadelphia's most prominent features is SEPTA's L, formerly known as the Market-Frankfort Elevated and colloquially called the "El" or Blue Line. Completed in 1907, this partially elevated, partially tunneled subway line linked West Philadelphia, Millbourne, and Upper Darby to Center City and, later, to Frankford. Running above and, for a portion, under Market Street, it transports hundreds of thousands of students and workers daily into and around the city.

The El was once the economic engine of West Philadelphia. Retail districts lined Market Street and each street where there was a station. Many of these, with the exception of 52nd Street, are today largely residential areas. This change was hastened by renovation work on the El that forced road closures and detours, causing many businesses to fail.

=== Light rail ===
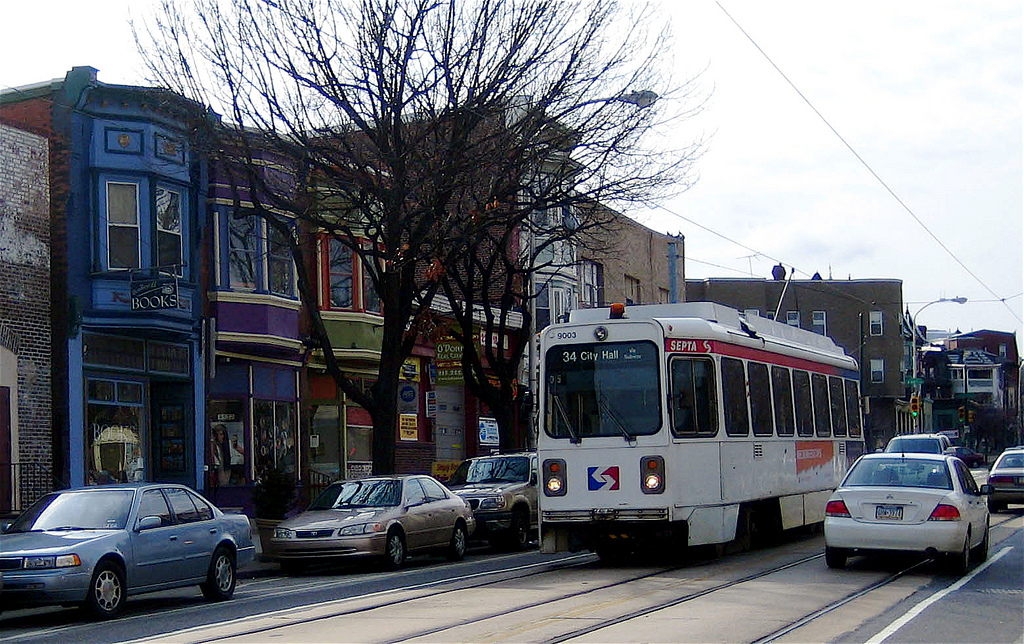
SEPTA'S Route 34 trolley in the 4500 block of Baltimore Pike

Another major transit link in West Philadelphia are the five subway-surface lines, often called the Green Lines after their representation on SEPTA route maps. These include five of Philadelphia's remaining six streetcar lines. Combined, these trolley routes convey more than 150,000 passengers daily, and operate 24-hour schedules, even in blizzards.

The Route 10 trolley runs along Lancaster Avenue from 63rd and Malvern Avenue through to 36th and Ludlow Streets where a portal allows access to the subway tunnel into Center City. The Route 34 trolley runs along Baltimore Avenue from Cobbs Creek at 61st Street to the transit tunnel at 40th Street in University City. The Route 13 trolley runs along Chester Avenue from the transit tunnel at 40th Street and Baltimore Avenue to 67th Street where it turns off Chester Avenue and continues along PA Route 13 into Yeadon, Delaware County on to its terminus at Green Lane.

The Route 11 trolley runs along Woodland Avenue from the transit tunnel at 40th Street to the city line at Cobbs Creek and continues into Darby Borough. Finally, the Route 36 trolley is the longest trolley Green Line service. The 36 trolley leaves the 40th Street transit tunnel running along Woodland Avenue until 49th Street where it turns south to continue along Lindbergh Boulevard turning at Elmwood Avenue starting at 55th Street. Route 36 terminates in Southwest Philadelphia at Island Avenue west and 73rd Street, near the Philadelphia International Airport.

Two other trolley lines originally ran through West Philly. The Route 38 trolley, running from Wynfield to Center City via Belmont Avenue, and the Route 31 trolley, running from Overbrook to Center City via Haverford Avenue, were replaced by diesel buses when the Philadelphia Transportation Company transferred control of the trolley service to National City Lines.

=== Regional rail ===
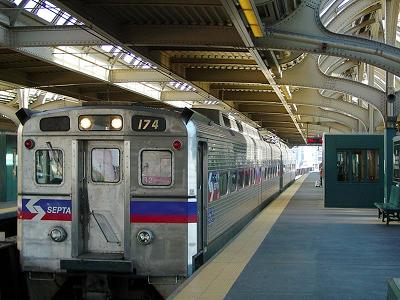
A SEPTA Media/Wawa Line Silverliner IV at 30th Street Station

West Philadelphia is also served by five of SEPTA's thirteen Regional Rail Lines, which transport thousands of commuters daily to and from Center City and University City, and provide a quick and inexpensive link to the Philadelphia International Airport. [All 13 serve 30th Street Station on the edge of West Philadelphia.] The Airport Line serves University City at University City Station in the University of Pennsylvania, going on to southernmost Southwest Philadelphia and the airport. The Media/Wawa Line also serves University City and portions of Southwest Philadelphia before continuing to Media and points beyond.

The Paoli/Thorndale Line serves Overbrook and Wynnefield, and continues to the Main Line communities and Paoli. However, the Paoli/Thorndale does not stop anywhere between 30th Street and City Line Avenue, instead bypassing most of West Philadelphia ever since the closure of 52nd Street station. The Cynwyd Line is a limited-service express line from Center City to the Bala Cynwyd neighborhood of Lower Merion Township.

Most of these passenger trips originate outside of the city, but more West Philly residents are using SEPTA's multi-ride "Transpass", which allows unlimited rides on SEPTA vehicles within the city limits.

Community groups have called on SEPTA to reopen closed Regional Rail stations in areas further away from the Market-Frankford Line and the Broad Street Line.

=== Streets ===
West Philadelphia's streets are laid out in a modified grid. The main thoroughfare, Market Street, runs East and West, paralleled to the north and south by smaller streets named for tree species. North–south streets are numbered, rising consecutively from 30th Street at the Schuylkill River to 77th Street on the far western edge near Cobbs Creek and to the block-long 90th Street in Southwest Philadelphia near the airport.

The highest numbered street to run any considerable distance contiguously is 58th Street, which runs from the northern frontier of West Philadelphia at City Avenue south to the Schuylkill River. 77th and 86th Streets run just a few blocks before they leave the city for surrounding jurisdictions. (For example, 84th Street becomes Hook Road when it crosses into Sharon Hill.) The 77th Street in Overbrook is not contiguous with the 77th Street in the column of streets that ends with 90th Street in Southwest Philadelphia. The two 77th Streets (as well as all numbered streets after 58th) are miles apart.

The street grid ends at Cobbs Creek Park along with the western political boundary of Philadelphia, but many of the street names and a roughly similar street grid (it begins to degrade outside the city) continue beyond the city limits into Upper Darby Township, into which Market Street runs uninterrupted to 69th street at the El terminal, where it turns into West Chester Pike and runs through Delaware County and into Chester County. With the exception of Market Street, these streets can be regarded as being "named after" the streets in West Philadelphia, not continuations, as they are cut off by the park. The numbering pattern is mixed; someone traveling along Market Street into Upper Darby would cross 62nd Street, then Cobbs Creek Parkway/63rd St, then several named streets until finally arriving at 69th Street, skipping 64–68.

East-West Tree Streets	Lanes	Direction
Ludlow Street	1 lane	Alternates
Chestnut Street	3 lanes	Eastbound
Sansom Street	1 lane	Westbound
Walnut Street	2 lanes	Westbound
Locust Street	2 lanes	Two-way
Spruce Street	2 lanes	Two-way
Pine Street	2 lanes	Two-way
Osage Avenue	1 lane	One-way/alternates
Larchwood Street	1 or 2 lanes	Alternates
Hazel Avenue	2 lanes	Two-way
Cedar Avenue	2 lanes	Two-way

Other major thoroughfares include Chestnut and Walnut Streets, which together form Pennsylvania Route 3. Every day, thousands of vehicles travel this route, which is one of the major commuter routes into and out of Philadelphia from Delaware and Chester Counties. In the 1960s and 1970s, illuminated signs announced what speed to drive to travel 4.3 miles into Center City without stopping for a red light. The streets were once lined with American Chestnut and walnut trees that touched across the five lanes of roadway, but many were removed due to Chestnut blight and replaced with a mix of sycamore and poplar trees. City officials found these species much more tolerant of the urban environment and resistant to disease. A handful of chestnut trees remain near Cobbs Creek.

Lancaster Avenue begins at 34th street near Drexel University; runs westward to the city line at City Avenue; and continues on as U.S. Route 30 to Lancaster, York, Pittsburgh. and the West Virginia border. One of the major retail strips in West Philadelphia, it is lined with shops and restaurants through to 64th Street in the Wynnefield neighborhood. In addition, one of Philadelphia's six streetcar lines, the Route 10 Green Line, transports commuters and students daily along Lancaster Avenue from 36th and Ludlow streets to 63rd and Malvern Avenue in Wynnefield.

== Crime ==
The intersection of 52nd Street and Market Street in West Philadelphia was listed number eight in a 2007 list of the city's top ten recreational drug corners according to an article by Philadelphia Weekly reporter Steve Volk.

The Philadelphia Police Department divides West Philadelphia into four patrol districts: the 16th, 18th, 19th, and 92nd.

== Schools ==
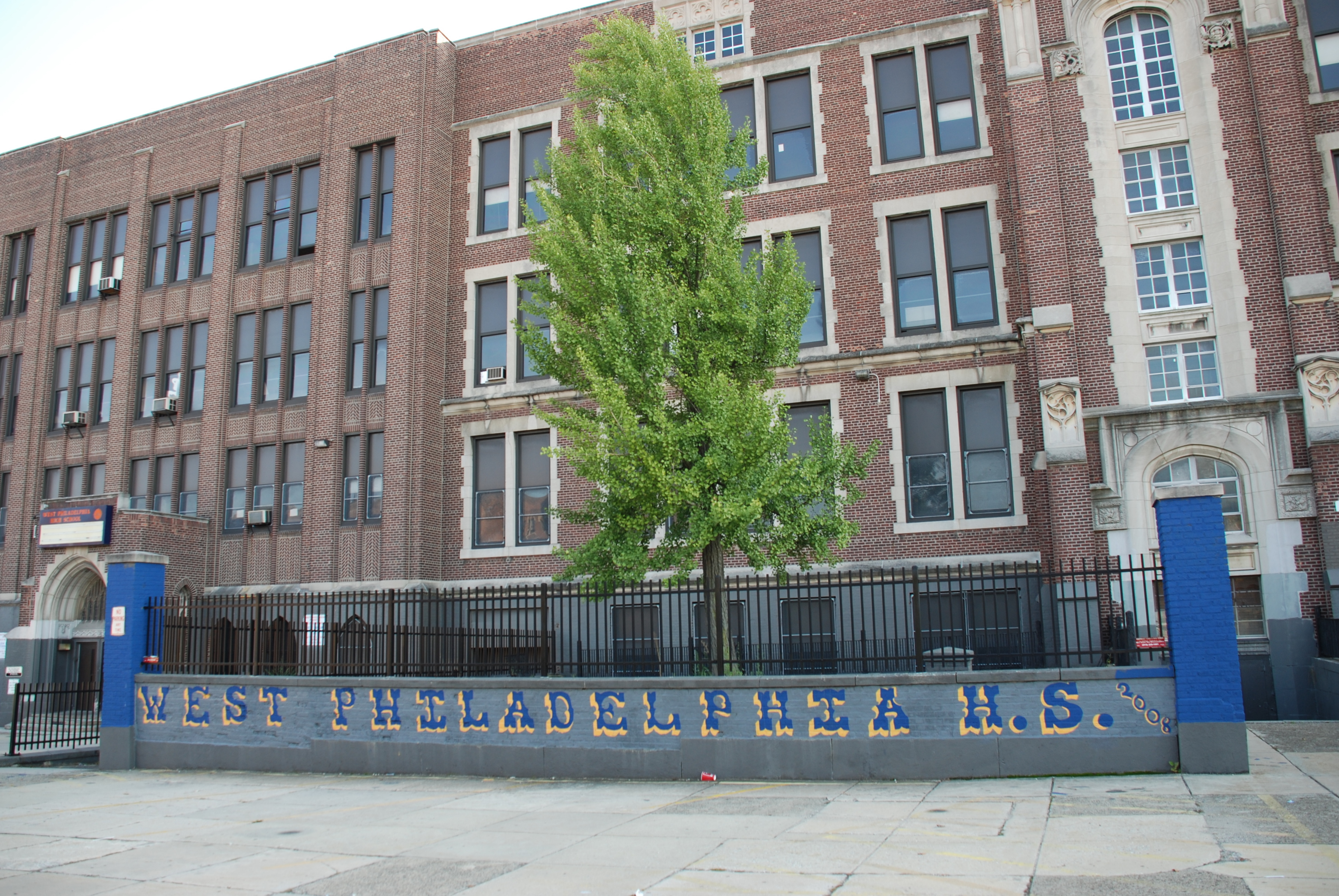
Former building of West Philadelphia High School, now apartments

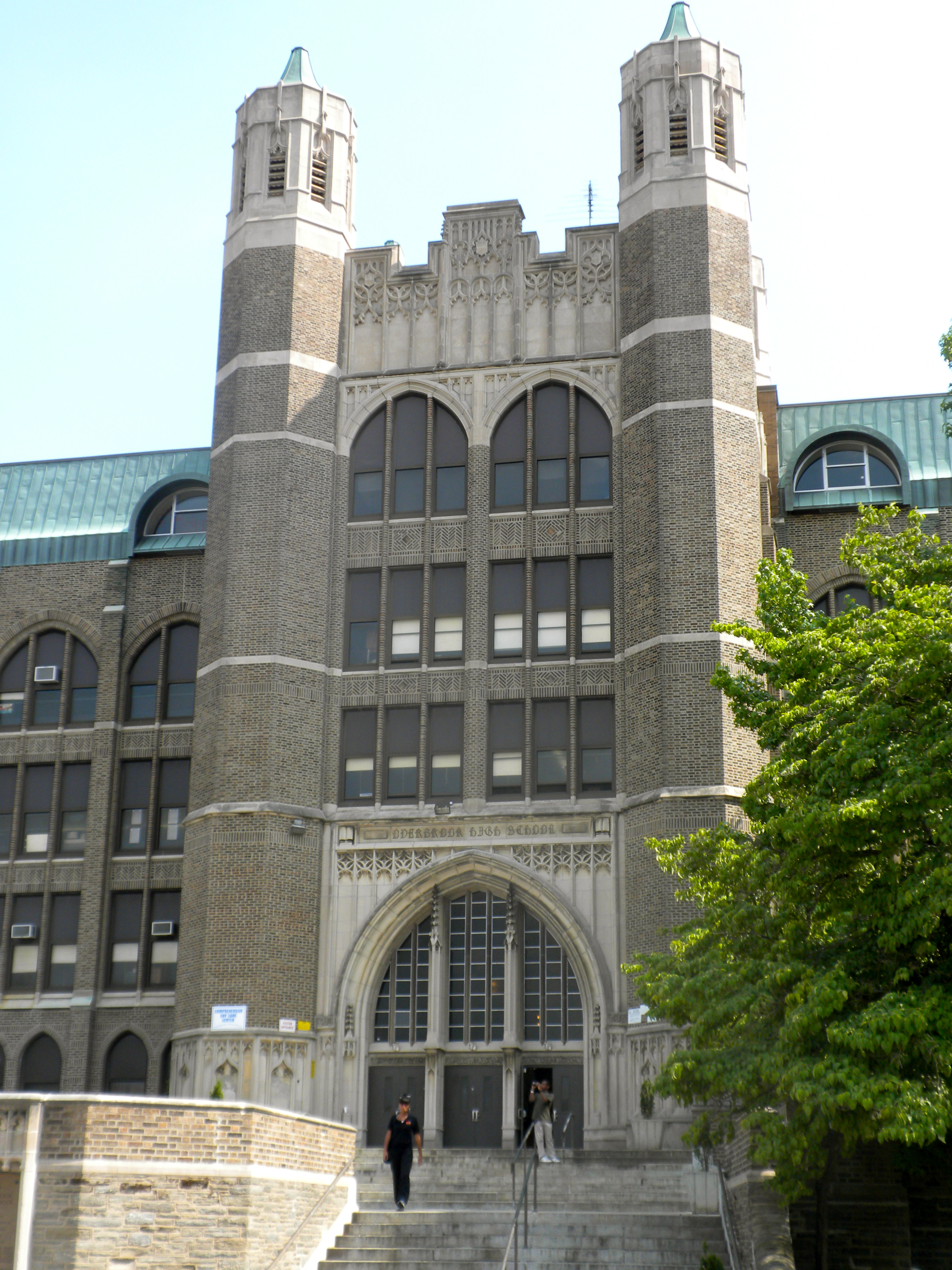
Overbrook High School

=== Primary and secondary schools ===
==== Public schools ====
The area's public schools are operated by the School District of Philadelphia.

West Philadelphia High School was one of the biggest and most diverse schools in state when it was opened in 1911. The students of "West" were the children of middle-class black people, as well as of Irish, Jewish, Polish and other immigrant groups.

Other high schools include University City High School; William L. Sayre High School, formerly Sayre Middle School; Robert E. Lamberton High School; Mastery Charter Shoemaker Campus, formerly William Shoemaker Middle School; and Overbrook High School.

Elementary schools include Morton McMichael Elementary School and Lea Elementary School. Harrity Elementary School is a district-owned school operated by Mastery Charter Schools.

==== Private schools ====
Blocks away from "West" were the West Philadelphia Catholic High Schools for Girls at 46th Street and Boys at 48th Street, now consolidated into West Catholic Preparatory High School in the building at 46th Street. St. Thomas More High School for Boys at 47th and Wyalusing Avenue was closed in 1975 and now houses the Sr Clara Muhammad School.

=== Colleges and universities ===
West Philadelphia is the home to several universities, including the University of Pennsylvania, Drexel University, and Saint Joseph's University. Another university in the neighborhood, the University of the Sciences in Philadelphia, was merged into Saint Joseph's in 2022.

== Destinations ==
West Philadelphia has about 75 of Philadelphia's 196 blue historic markers, which note historically important birthplaces, homes, business and other places.

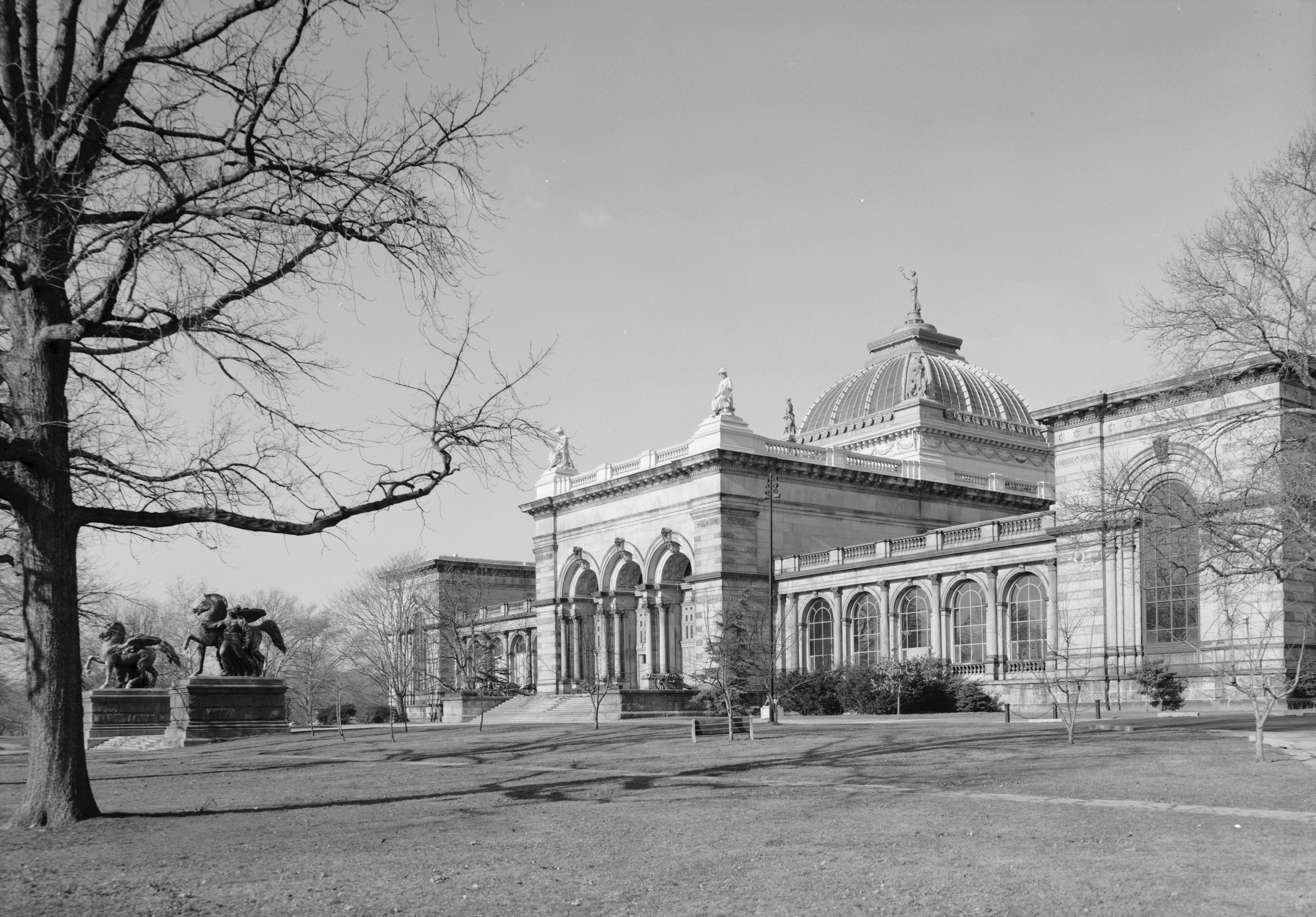
Memorial Hall

The nation's oldest zoological garden, the Philadelphia Zoo, has exhibitions and educational programs. Nestled in the center of Fairmount Park, it is near Memorial Hall, the current home of the Please Touch Museum, Kelly Pool, The Carousel House, and the new Microsoft partner high school, the "School of the Future"

Cultural venues include the Mann Music Center of the Performing Arts and the Bushfire Theater of the Performing Arts on 52nd Street.

West Philadelphia contains many places of worship. These include mosques such as Masjid Al-Jamia, a Sunni Muslim institution at 4228 Walnut Street. Founded in the late 1980s, Masjid Al-Jamia is located in the former Commodore Theatre, a cinema which opened in 1928 and which was built in the Spanish Colonial or Moorish architectural style.

Cathedral Cemetery was founded in 1849 and is the oldest Catholic cemetery in Philadelphia. It contains the burials of several notable people including over 50 members of the 69th Pennsylvania Infantry Regiment who fought in the American Civil War.

== In media ==
Actor and rapper Will Smith, a Wynnefield native, brought some fame to West Philadelphia with the theme song to the NBC sitcom The Fresh Prince of Bel-Air, in which he raps, "In West Philadelphia, born and raised...."

The NBC drama American Dreams is set in West Philadelphia in the mid-1960s.

West Philadelphia was the home of American Bandstand, the popular dance show that launched the career of host Dick Clark and turned some local high school students into teen idols. Beginning in 1952, the show was produced in Studio B of television station WFIL-TV (Channel 6, now WPVI-TV), located in the station's then-new addition at 4548 Market Street. The building, which still sports a large satellite dish on its roof, is now home to the West Philadelphia Enterprise Center.

The ABC television show Abbott Elementary is set in West Philadelphia.

== See also ==
- National Register of Historic Places listings in West Philadelphia
