= 30th Street Station District =

Urban development in West Philadelphia, Pennsylvania

- 30th Street Station District on John F. Kennedy Boulevard featuring 30th Street Station shown behind Schuylkill Yards signage. Cira Centre is the tall building on the left.
- Interactive map of 30th Street Station District
- Location: West Philadelphia, Pennsylvania, U.S.
- Coordinates: 39.9547°N 75.1683°W
- Status: Under construction
- Groundbreaking: 2017
- Estimated completion: 2046
- Website: 30th Street Station District

Companies
- Architect: Skidmore, Owings & Merrill
- Developer: Brandywine Realty Trust
- Owner: Amtrak and City of Philadelphia

Technical details
- Cost: $6.5 Billion
- Buildings: 2901 Arch Street - 1,200 ft (365m): 3001 JFK Blvd - 705 ft (214m); 2928 Race Street - 670 ft (204m); 3100 Cherry Street - 605 ft (184m); 2929 Race Street - 590 ft (180m); 3000 Baring Street - 570 ft (174m); 3100 Winter Street - 435 ft (132m); 3120 Race Street - 405 ft (123m)
- Size: 7,623,000 sq. feet

The 30th Street Station District, also referred to as the 30th Street District, is a master planned urban development centered around 30th Street Station located in West Philadelphia in Philadelphia, Pennsylvania, United States. The area, if approved and built, will be home to eight modern skyscrapers or high rises ranging in heights between 405 ft and 1,200 ft with four other buildings under 400 feet. The property will be owned by Amtrak and will be a major addition to the City of Philadelphia. The project is expected to cost between seven and eleven billion dollars.

The project would be a huge addition to the city with some of the largest buildings not in Center City and expanding downtown west of the Schuylkill River.

Aside from adding new buildings to the skyline, architects has put in their plans to connect West Philadelphia to Center City by adding new walking paths, a walking bridge, and more connections to make traveling by car or bus from the 30th Street Station to downtown Philadelphia easier and faster. In addition, the placement of the current phase of construction would allow expansion north towards the Philadelphia Museum of Art and the Philadelphia Zoo.

== Project history ==
The 30th Street Station District Plan is a long-range, joint master planning effort led by Amtrak, Brandywine Realty Trust, Drexel University, the Pennsylvania Department of Transportation, and SEPTA to develop a comprehensive vision for the future of the 30th Street Station District in the year 2050 and beyond.

A $2 billion investment in roads, utilities, parks, bridges, and extension of transit services will unlock $4.5 billion in private real estate investment, in addition to an estimated $3.5 billion for Drexel’s Schuylkill Yards project, which is located within the district. These investments in the District are predicted to have robust and widespread economic development benefits, with the potential to generate $3.8 billion in City and State taxes and 40,000 jobs when complete.

The project launched in the summer of 2014, and had its first public meeting by that winter. The project had four additional public meetings in summer of 2015, the fall of 2015, and two in the spring of 2016. The planning process was officially completed in June 2016, and is set to be undertaken in various phases.

As of January 2024, there are currently three projects undergoing. The renovation of 30th Street Station began in 2023, and will conclude in 2027. These renovations include building maintenance such as façade cleaning and restoration, improvements of Market Street Plaza, expanded retail offerings, station modernization, corporate office renovation, etc. There is a project underway to improve the SEPTA 30th Street subway and trolley station, including new elevators at 31st Street and a new head house at 30th Street, of which the former is complete. Additionally, a ramp modification study is underway for I-76.

== Plan ==
The District Plan lays out a vision for the next 35 years and beyond to:

- Accommodate a projected 20 to 25 million passenger trips per year – double the current capacity – circulating through an enhanced 30th Street Station;
- Build 18 million square feet of new development;
- House between 8,000 and 10,000 new residents;
- Support up to 40,000 jobs; and
- Create 40 acres of new open space or green space for the city, including a new civic space at the station’s front door.

=== Reconnecting the station ===
Passenger volume at 30th Street Station is projected to more than double within the next 25 years. Travel to the District is possible via a number of modes, with nearly 100,000 trips made daily by train, subway, bus, trolley, car, bicycle, or on foot. However, the modes do not clearly connect, creating a confusing and sometimes precarious experience for visitors.

For almost 30 years, passengers transferring between 30th Street Station and the trolley and subway lines below Market Street have lacked a covered, climate-controlled route, forced instead to leave the station and cross a busy 30th Street. The Plan proposes to re-establish a convenient and safe connection between these stations, via a new stairway within 30th Street Station’s Main Hall and through an active and day-lit below-grade retail concourse.

The Plan also envisions a permanent home for intercity buses (BoltBus, Megabus, and others) on the north side of Arch Street as part of an integrated, multimodal transportation facility. The new intercity bus terminal connects directly via pedestrian bridge to 30th Street Station and provides an indoor waiting area along with bus queuing. In the long-term, an additional Amtrak concourse could anchor this new transit center.

== Funding and Cost ==
Amtrak and its partners in the proposed redevelopment of a massive swath around 30th Street Station in University City say the decades-long plan, including partially capping the adjacent rail yard, will involve $6.5 billion in infrastructure funding and private investment. The financial projection is part of the planning team's final blueprint for the 175-acre site extending northeast from 30th Street Station.

Publication of the 30th Street Station District Plan ends a two-year, $5.25 million study led by Amtrak, Drexel University, Brandywine Realty Trust, SEPTA, and PennDot for the area between Walnut and Spring Garden Streets east of Drexel's campus and Powelton Village.

=== Buildings ===
The 35-year plan to build a dense urban neighborhood, largely over what are now 88 acres of rail yards, will require about $2 billion in infrastructure investment, according to a plan summary. That spending on roads, bridges, parks, and transit would enable about $4.5 billion in private investment by developers of office towers, residential buildings, hotels, and other projects.

Anticipated is about 18 million square feet of new development, including enough housing to accommodate up to 10,000 residents. The commercial space includes about 1.2 million square feet planners hope will be occupied by a single corporate, commercial, or institutional tenant that will anchor the development, though none has yet been secured.

== Project partners ==
As of January 2024 the following are partners of the project:

- Amtrak
- Brandywine Realty Trust
- Drexel University
- Pennsylvania Department of Transportation
- SEPTA
- City of Philadelphia
- CSX Corporation
- Delaware Valley Regional Planning Commission
- Philadelphia Industrial Development Corporation
- NJ Transit
- Schuylkill Banks
- University City District
- University of Pennsylvania

== Awards ==
Award	Date awarded	Ref
2017 American Institute of Architects Award	January 13, 2017	

== See also ==
- Schuylkill Yards
- List of tallest buildings in Philadelphia
