= 52nd Street station (SEPTA Regional Rail) =

Former train station in Philadelphia, Pennsylvania, US

52nd Street
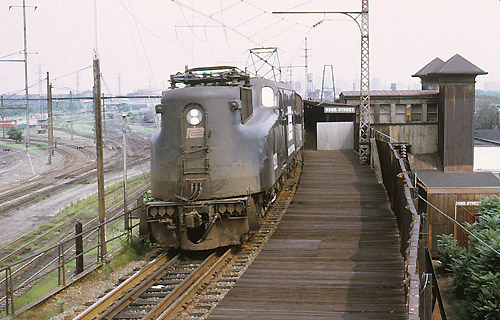
- Westbound train at 52nd Street station in 1973

General information
- Location: North 52nd Street & Merion Avenue; Philadelphia, Pennsylvania
- Coordinates: 39.9779°N 75.2263°W
- Owner: Pennsylvania Railroad
- Lines: Pennsylvania Main Line; Paoli Line; Schuylkill Branch

Construction
- Structure type: Elevated
- Platform levels: 2

History
- Opened: 1902
- Closed: August 23, 1980
- Electrified: 1930

Former services
Preceding station	Amtrak	Following station
Overbrook toward Harrisburg	Silverliner Service One westbound trip only	Philadelphia–30th Street toward Philadelphia–Suburban
Preceding station	SEPTA	Following station
Overbrook toward Downingtown	Paoli/Thorndale Line	30th Street Station toward Suburban Station
Wynnefield Avenue toward Ivy Ridge	Ivy Ridge Line	30th Street Station toward Suburban Station
Preceding station	Pennsylvania Railroad	Following station
Cynwyd toward Pottsville	Schuylkill Branch	Philadelphia toward Suburban Station
Wynnefield Avenue toward Norristown–Haws Avenue	Norristown Line	Philadelphia toward Suburban Station
Overbrook toward Paoli	Paoli Line	Philadelphia toward Suburban Station
Overbrook toward Paoli	Paoli Line	40th Street toward Suburban Station
Location

52nd Street is a closed train station that was located at the intersection of North 52nd Street & Merion Avenue (just north of Lancaster Avenue (US-30)) in the West Philadelphia section of Philadelphia, Pennsylvania, United States. It was built by the Pennsylvania Railroad (PRR) at the junction of its Main Line and its Schuylkill Branch. Today, these lines are the SEPTA Regional Rail Paoli/Thorndale Line and Cynwyd Line, respectively.

== History ==
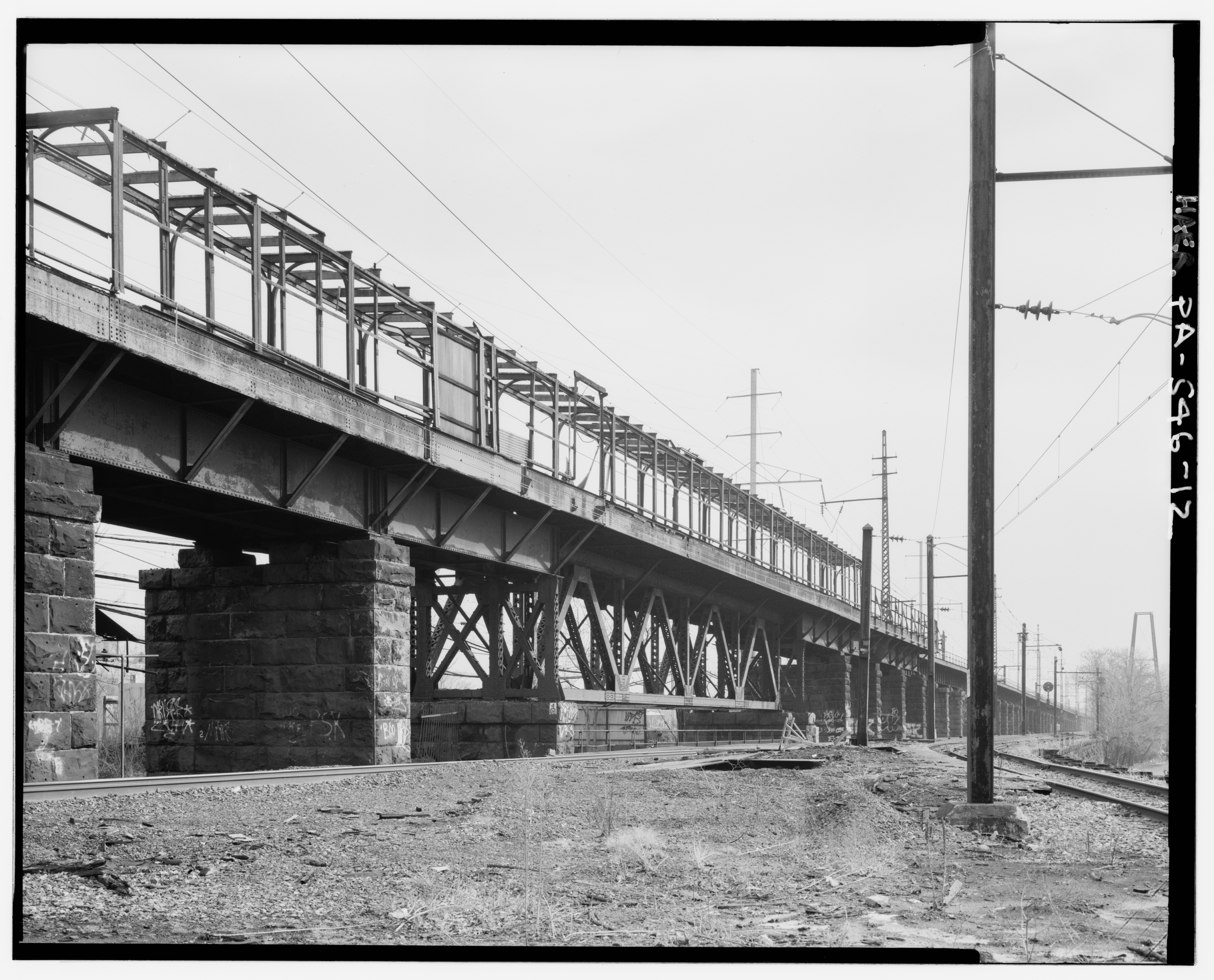
The abandoned 52nd Street station in 1999

At 52nd Street, the Main Line is on an embankment at-grade, while the Schuylkill Branch is on an elevated structure including a Parker through truss spanning 388 feet (118 m) over the Main Line on an extreme skew. A lit sign informed inbound passengers which platform the next train to Center City, Philadelphia would depart from. Only a few trains in each direction stopped at this station, mostly serving reverse commuters heading out to jobs in the Main Line suburbs in the morning and returning home to the city in the evening.

Through merger and bankruptcy, the station and the trains serving it passed from the PRR to the Penn Central to Conrail (the later under contract to SEPTA). The first westbound morning trip of Amtrak's Silverliner Service also stopped at the station.

The station was burned by vandals on August 16, 1980. Conrail bused passengers until the 23rd, when SEPTA chose to outright close the station. The station came down in 1995 as part of revitalization efforts.

Proposals have been made to reopen the station, either in conjunction with projects such as the Schuylkill Valley Metro, or as part of community revitalization efforts.
