= Wynnefield Avenue station =

SEPTA Regional Rail station

Wynnefield Avenue
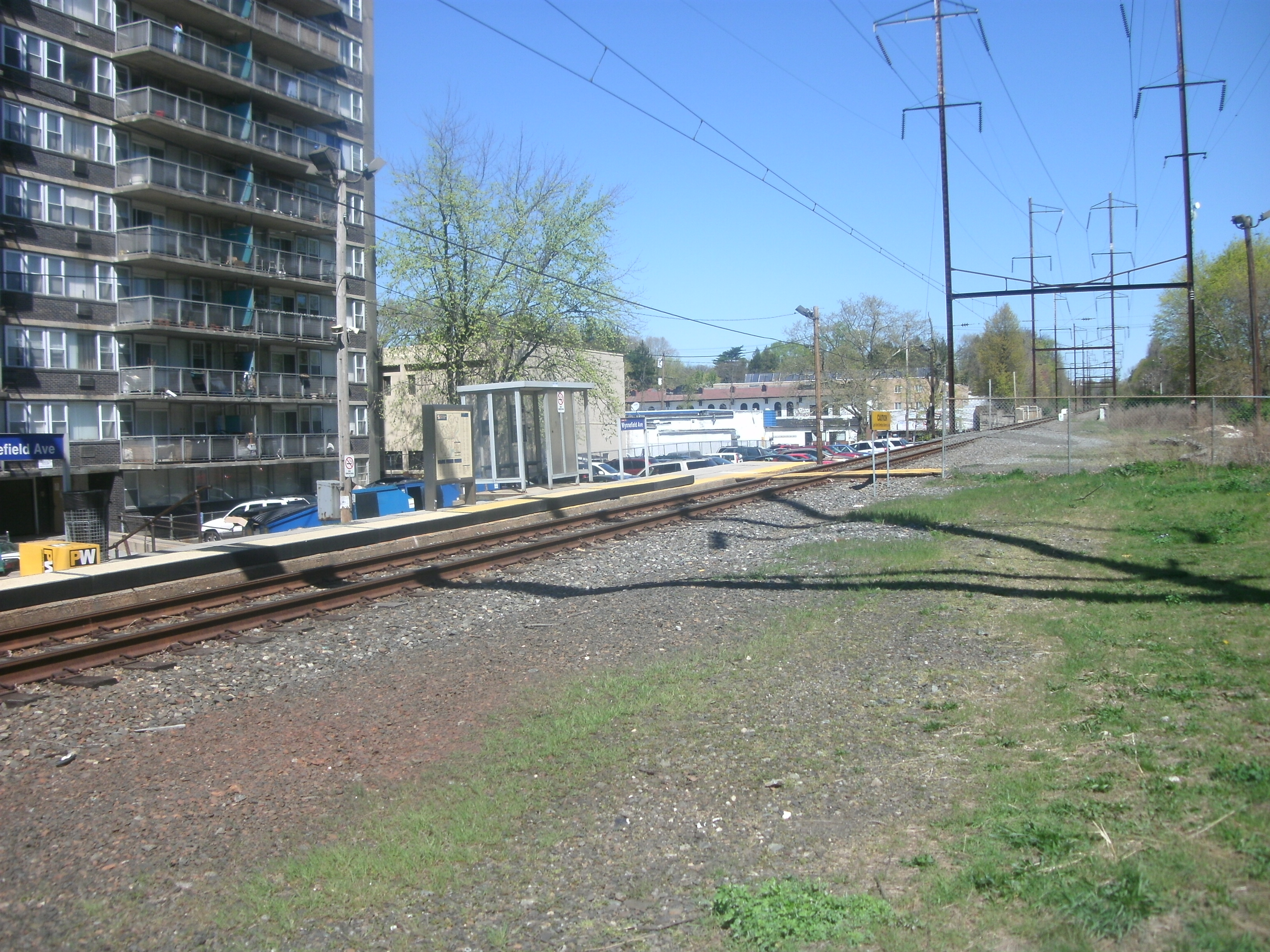
- Wynnefield Avenue station platform in April 2012

General information
- Location: 5024 Wynnefield Avenue; Philadelphia, Pennsylvania, U.S.
- Coordinates: 39°59′25″N 75°13′33″W
- Owner: SEPTA
- Platforms: 1 side platform
- Tracks: 1
- Connections: SEPTA City Bus: 40

Construction
- Parking: 20 spaces
- Accessible: Yes

Other information
- Station code: 90003
- Fare zone: 1

History
- Electrified: 1930

Services
Preceding station	SEPTA	Following station
Bala toward Cynwyd	Cynwyd Line	30th Street Station toward Suburban Station
Former services
Preceding station	SEPTA	Following station
Bala toward Ivy Ridge	Ivy Ridge Line	52nd Street toward Suburban Station
Preceding station	Pennsylvania Railroad	Following station
Bala toward Norristown–Haws Avenue	Norristown Line	52nd Street toward Suburban Station
Location

Wynnefield Avenue station is a SEPTA Regional Rail station in Philadelphia, Pennsylvania. Located at Wynnefield and Bryn Mawr Avenues, it serves the Cynwyd Line.
