= List of busiest Amtrak stations =

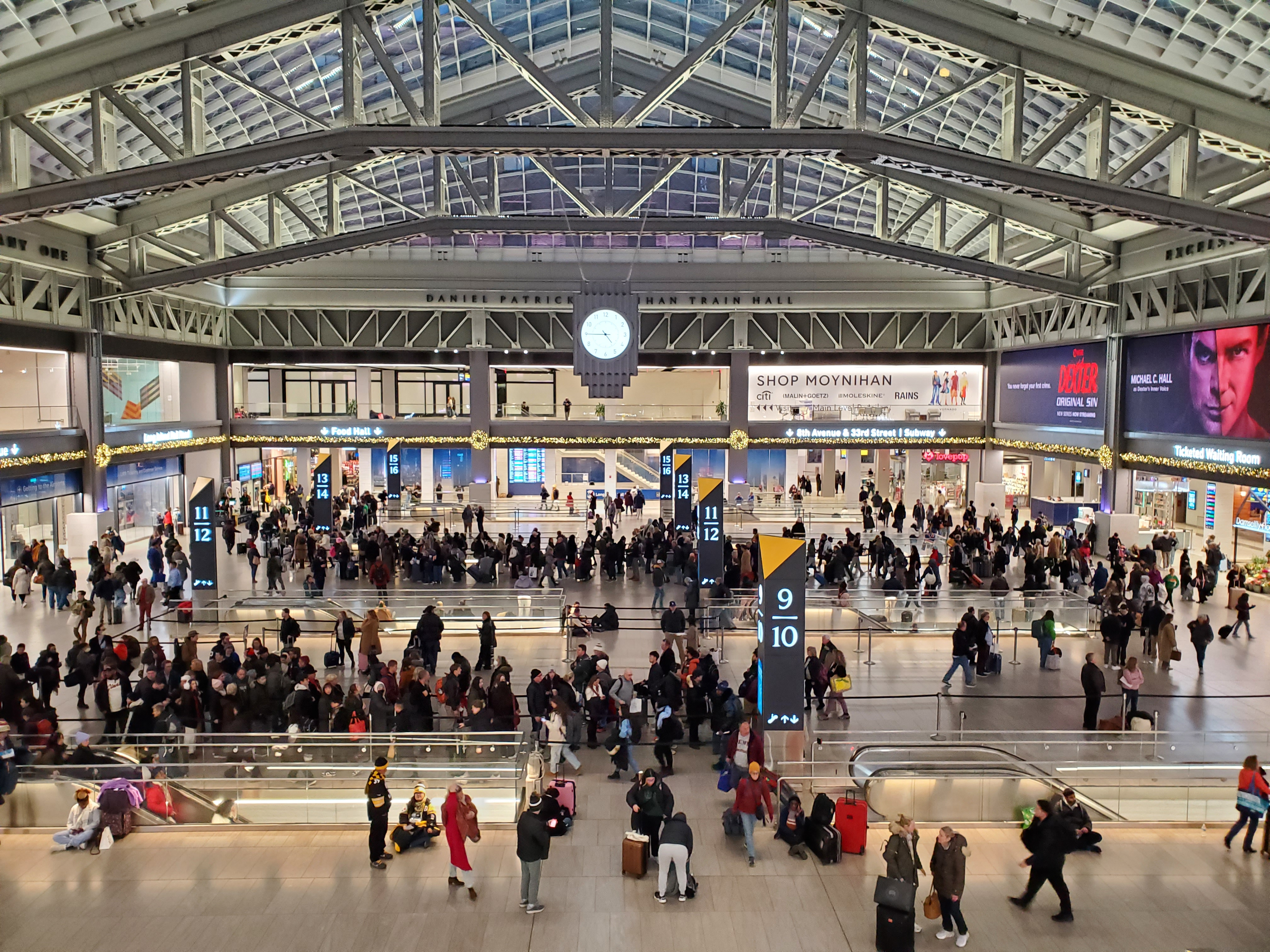
Moynihan Train Hall, the main concourse for Amtrak at New York's Penn Station, the busiest in the system with over 13 million passengers in 2025

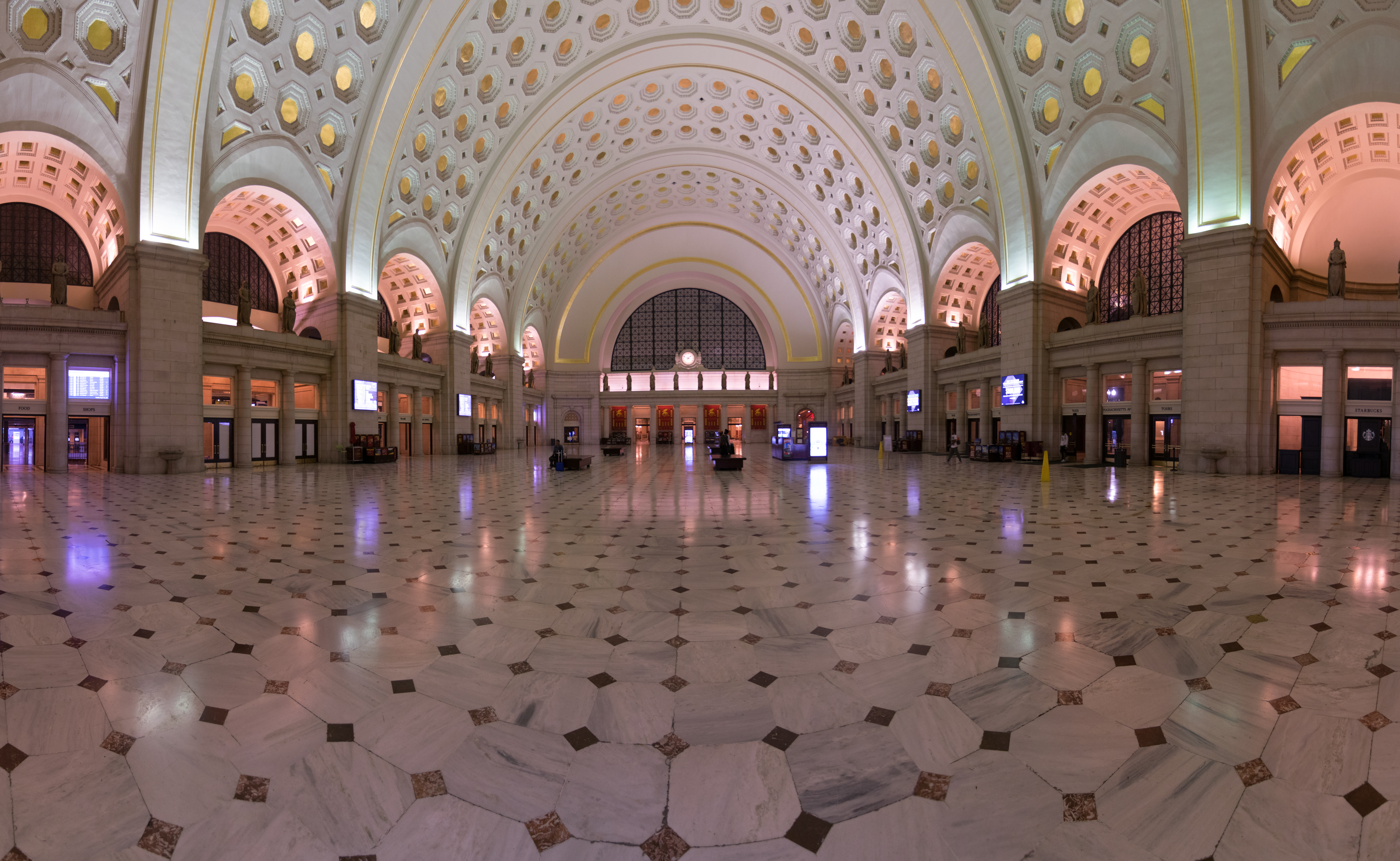
The interior of Washington Union Station in Washington, D.C., Amtrak's second-busiest station in the nation with over 6 million passengers in 2025

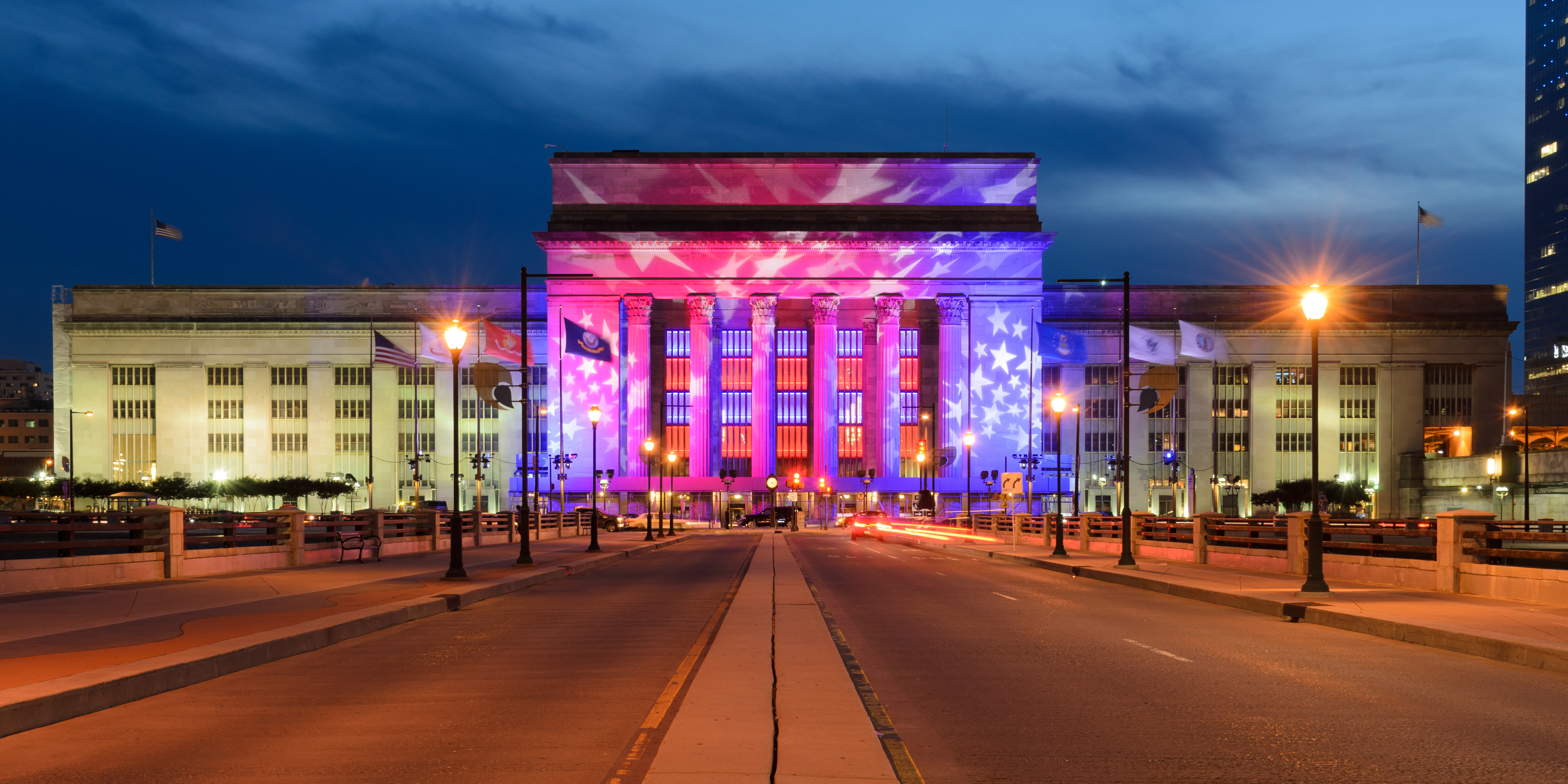
30th Street Station in Philadelphia, Amtrak's third-busiest train station in the nation with over 5.5 million passengers in 2025

This is a list of the busiest Amtrak stations in the United States ranked by their respective Amtrak ridership by fiscal year. Ridership is defined as the total number of boarding and alightings at each station. Ridership figures since 2015 have been provided for comparative purposes. In the fiscal year 2020, ridership was down significantly across the board due to the impact of the COVID-19 pandemic. Ridership numbers are for Amtrak only—commuter rail, subway, and other modes are not included.

== 2025 ==
Top ten busiest Amtrak stations in fiscal year 2025.

#	Station	City	State	Ridership
1	New York Penn Station	New York City	New York	13,037,414
2	Washington Union Station	Washington	District of Columbia	6,010,221
3	30th Street Station	Philadelphia	Pennsylvania	5,586,174
4	Chicago Union Station	Chicago	Illinois	3,175,856
5	South Station	Boston	Massachusetts	1,884,275
6	Baltimore Penn Station	Baltimore	Maryland	1,333,185
7	Los Angeles Union Station	Los Angeles	California	1,066,614
8	Albany–Rensselaer station	Rensselaer	New York	920,779
9	BWI Thurgood Marshall Airport station	Baltimore	Maryland	911,275
10	Back Bay Station	Boston	Massachusetts	894,548

== 2024 ==
Top ten busiest Amtrak stations in fiscal year 2024.

#	Station	City	State	Ridership
1	New York Penn Station	New York City	New York	12,023,038
2	Washington Union Station	Washington	District of Columbia	5,639,617
3	30th Street Station	Philadelphia	Pennsylvania	5,060,770
4	Chicago Union Station	Chicago	Illinois	3,011,972
5	South Station	Boston	Massachusetts	1,795,454
6	Baltimore Penn Station	Baltimore	Maryland	1,301,274
7	Los Angeles Union Station	Los Angeles	California	1,053,965
8	Back Bay Station	Boston	Massachusetts	916,579
9	New Haven Union Station	New Haven	Connecticut	907,500
10	Albany–Rensselaer station	Rensselaer	New York	899,048

== 2021 - 2023 ==
#	Station	City	State	Ridership			2022-2023 Change
#	Station	City	State	FY 2021	FY 2022	FY 2023	2022-2023 Change
1	New York Penn Station	New York City	New York	4,061,379	8,008,700	10,249,956	▲27.99%
2	Washington Union Station	Washington	District of Columbia	1,758,409	3,631,677	4,751,407	▲30.83%
3	30th Street Station	Philadelphia	Pennsylvania	1,500,043	3,058,329	4,197,176	▲37.24%
4	Chicago Union Station	Chicago	Illinois	1,336,525	2,359,084	2,722,448	▲15.40%
5	South Station	Boston	Massachusetts	679,333	1,216,560	1,538,648	▲26.48%
6	Baltimore Penn Station	Baltimore	Maryland	446,914	838,591	1,081,133	▲28.92%
7	Union Station	Los Angeles	California	466,417	928,558	1,000,243	▲7.72%
8	Union Station	New Haven	Connecticut	347,544	617,119	792,634	▲28.44%
9	Albany–Rensselaer	Rensselaer	New York	379,209	640,353	790,673	▲23.45%
10	Back Bay Station	Boston	Massachusetts	322,928	606,967	750,036	▲23.57%

== 2015 - 2020 ==
#	Station	City	State	Ridership						
#	Station	City	State	FY 2015	FY 2016	FY 2017	FY 2018	FY 2019	FY 2020	2019–2020 change
1	Penn Station	New York City	New York	10,189,521	10,436,909	10,397,729	10,132,025	10,811,323	5,432,851	▼49.75%
2	Washington Union Station	Washington	District of Columbia	4,971,128	5,098,562	5,225,460	5,197,237	5,207,223	2,606,059	▼49.95%
3	30th Street Station	Philadelphia	Pennsylvania	4,138,777	4,328,718	4,411,662	4,471,992	4,503,055	2,261,194	▼49.79%
4	Chicago Union Station	Chicago	Illinois	3,295,630	3,247,117	3,388,051	3,388,307	3,331,527	1,688,452	▼49.32%
5	South Station	Boston	Massachusetts	1,544,169	1,574,450	1,567,627	1,553,953	1,585,216	793,113	▼49.97%
6	Union Station	Los Angeles	California	1,589,391	1,635,039	1,716,392	1,717,405	1,413,006	708,925	▼50.46%
7	Sacramento Valley Station	Sacramento	California	1,027,013	1,051,001	1,073,584	1,089,223	1,100,550	565,196	▼48.64%
8	Penn Station	Baltimore	Maryland	993,721	1,030,161	1,063,628	1,041,232	1,043,542	538,330	▼48.41%
9	Albany–Rensselaer	Rensselaer	New York	825,353	885,176	803,348	800,368	806,960	450,965	▼44.12%
10	Union Station	New Haven	Connecticut	698,656	642,471	627,065	697,603	778,534	425,723	▼45.32%

== See also ==
- List of Amtrak stations
- List of busiest railway stations in North America
