= Schuylkill Yards =

Philadelphia development project

Coordinates: 39.9551°N 75.1860°W

- Schuylkill Yards with 30th Street Station shown behind bridge on John F. Kennedy Boulevard
- Interactive map of Schuylkill Yards
- Location: West Philadelphia (Philadelphia, Pennsylvania)
- Status: Proposed
- Groundbreaking: Q3 2016
- Estimated completion: 2029
- Website: Schuylkill Yards site

Companies
- Architect: SHoP Architects; West 8
- Developer: Brandywine Realty Trust; Drexel University

Technical details
- Cost: US$3.5 billion
- Buildings: 3101 Market (1,095 ft); 3125 JFK Blvd (670 ft); 3001 Chestnut (515 ft); 3151 JFK Blvd (435 ft); 3000 Market (425 ft)
- Size: 14 acres (5.7 ha)

Schuylkill Yards is a $3.5 billion, masterplanned development project by Brandywine Realty Trust in West Philadelphia. The project was announced in a press conference in March 2016. The project is being designed in phases. Groundbreaking occurred in late 2017, and the first piece—a public park called Drexel Square—was delivered in June 2019.

== Announcement ==
The project was announced on 2 March 2016, in a press conference by Drexel University president John Fry. This was followed by an announcement in The Philadelphia Inquirer.

== Usage and design ==
The development will include approximately 6 million square feet (560,000 m^{2}) of residential, commercial, retail, green space, and laboratory spaces.

The design reveals multiple public spaces, each with their own distinct characteristics. A 1.3-acre plot (previously the parking lot at One Drexel Plaza) became a vibrant elliptical lawn and the center of Schuylkill Yards.

If built, 3101 Market would be the second tallest building in Philadelphia, or the third tallest if 2901 Arch Street of the 30th Street Station District is built.

== See also ==
- 30th Street Station District
- List of tallest buildings in Philadelphia
