= Saxbys Coffee =

American fast casual restaurant chain

Coordinates: 39.9542°N 75.1740°W

Saxbys
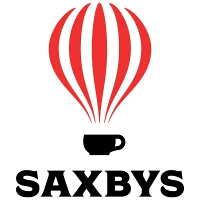
- Type: Private
- Industry: Fast food
- Founder: Nick Bayer
- Headquarters: Philadelphia, Pennsylvania
- Number of locations: 28 cafes (As of February 2024)
- Area served: Georgia, Indiana, Pennsylvania, Maryland, Massachusetts, New Jersey, New York, Ohio, Washington D.C., Virginia,
- Key people: Nick Bayer (Founder, CEO)
- Products: Fast casual/Bakery-café, including a variety of coffee including Espresso, classic drinks, cold brew collection, cold sandwiches, breakfast, smoothies, and teas
- Revenue: US$ 15 million (estimate)
- Number of employees: 500
- Website: saxbyscoffee.com

Saxbys is a certified benefit corporation fast casual restaurant on the eastern United States. Its headquarters are in Philadelphia, Pennsylvania. It sells coffee, other drinks, and bakery items. Saxbys was founded by Nick Bayer who is the CEO.

== History ==
Saxbys was founded in 2005 by Nick Bayer. Originally, Saxbys started off in Denver with an investment from Bayer, and it expanded into the Philadelphia region.

In 2009, Saxbys filed for bankruptcy as they were facing 18 lawsuits from former franchisees and investors who said the company owed them money. Even though the company was in court, they continued to open up new stores, including one in Center City, Philadelphia. According to Bayer, the company was re-built into "something we all believe in".

In September 2015, Saxbys moved its headquarters from Broomall, Pennsylvania, to Center City, Philadelphia. Their new headquarters is over 10,000 square feet and includes a Saxbys shop.

Saxbys runs an "experiential learning platform" with colleges and universities, including Temple University, Rowan University, Pennsylvania State University, and Saint Joseph's University. It has 12 student-run cafes on college campuses. Students are able to become "student CEOs" or student café executive officers, receiving academic credit and salary.

== Restaurants and locations ==
In 2014, the company launched an app for mobile payments at Saxbys location and receive rewards on the app for spending. As of October 2015, 35 percent to 40 percent of Saxbys is corporate-owned and the balance was franchised. In 2015, Saxbys corporate bought out two franchises in Philadelphia, one in 30th Street Station and the other on the campus of the University of Pennsylvania. Both stores were "completely torn down and rebuilt."
