= 30th Street Station =

Train station in Philadelphia, Pennsylvania

30th Street Station Philadelphia, PA
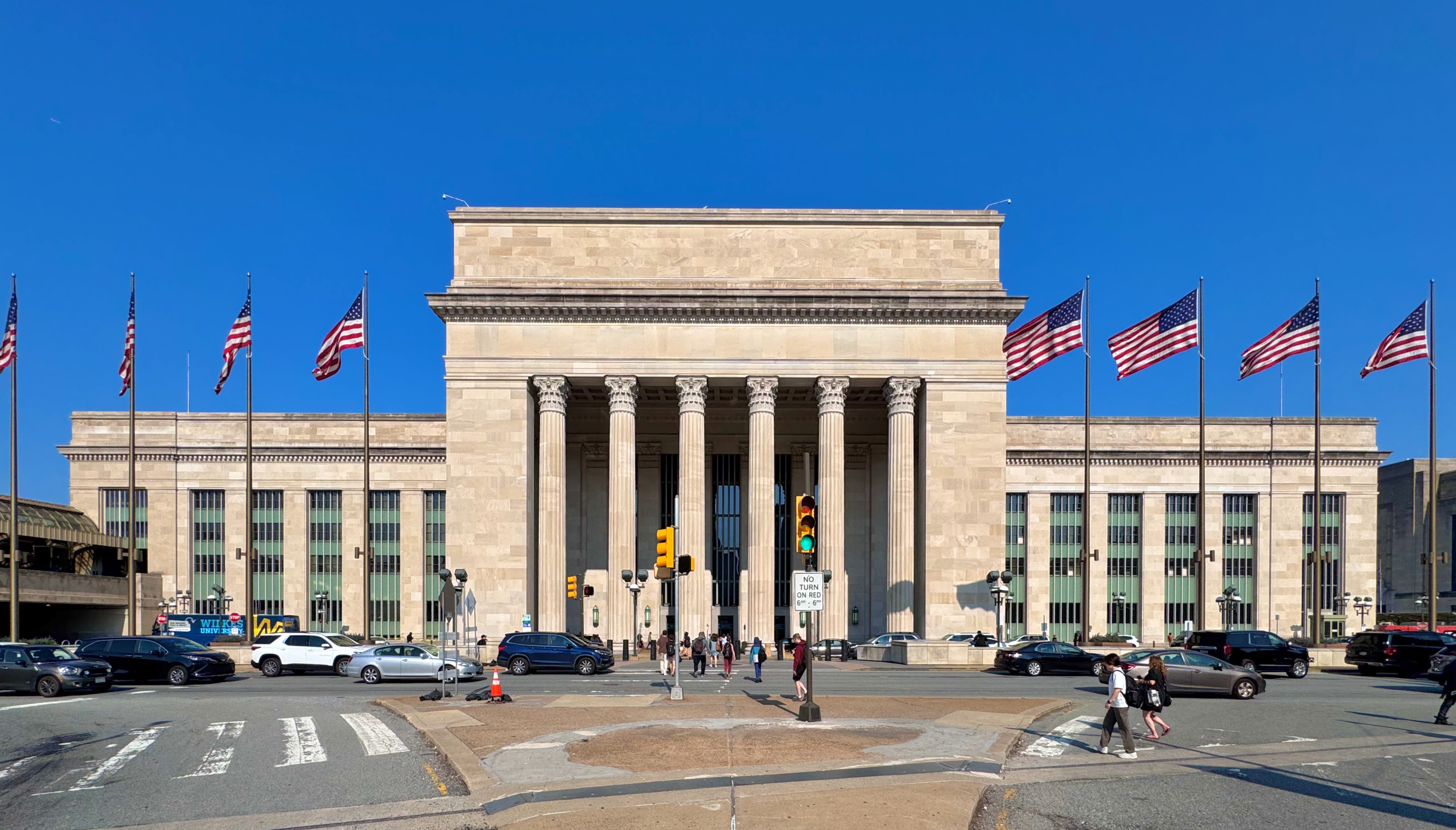
- The main entrance to 30th Street Station in June 2025

General information
- Other names: William H. Gray III 30th Street Station
- Location: 2955 Market Street; Philadelphia, Pennsylvania; United States
- Coordinates: 39°57′21″N 75°10′55″W
- Owner: Amtrak
- Lines: Amtrak Northeast Corridor; Keystone Corridor (Main Line); SEPTA Main Line
- Platforms: 9 island platforms (3 upper level, 6 lower level)
- Tracks: 15 (6 upper level, 9 lower level)
- Connections: SEPTA Metro: (Drexel Station at 30th Street); SEPTA City Bus: 9, 12, 21, 30, 31, 42, 44, 49, LUCY; SEPTA Suburban Bus: 124, 125; At JFK Boulevard & 30th Street: Martz Trailways; NJ Transit Bus: 316, 414, 417, 555

Construction
- Parking: Yes
- Cycle facilities: Yes
- Accessible: Yes

Other information
- Station code: Amtrak: PHL
- IATA code: ZFV
- Fare zone: CC (SEPTA)
- Website: gray30thstreetstation.com

History
- Opened: 1933 (Replaced West Philadelphia station)
- Rebuilt: 1989
- Former names: Pennsylvania Station–30th Street; Penn Central Station–30th Street

Passengers
Amtrak
- FY 2025: 5,586,174 annually
NJ Transit
- 2025: 452 (average weekday)
- Rank: 61 of 153
SEPTA
- 2017: 9,920 boardings (weekday average)
- Rank: 3 of 146
Services
Preceding station	Amtrak	Following station
Wilmington toward Washington, D.C.	Acela	Metropark toward Boston South
Wilmington toward Washington, D.C.	Vermonter	Trenton toward St. Albans
Wilmington toward Chicago	Cardinal	Trenton toward New York
Wilmington toward Charlotte	Carolinian	Trenton toward New York
Wilmington toward New Orleans	Crescent	Trenton toward New York
Wilmington toward Savannah	Palmetto	Trenton toward New York
Paoli toward Pittsburgh	Pennsylvanian	Trenton toward New York
Wilmington toward Miami	Silver Meteor	Trenton toward New York
Ardmore toward Harrisburg	Keystone Service	North Philadelphia toward New York
Wilmington toward Norfolk, Newport News or Roanoke	Northeast Regional	Trenton toward Boston South or Springfield
Preceding station	SEPTA	Following station
Penn Medicine Station toward Airport	Airport Line	Suburban Station toward Glenside
Terminus	Chestnut Hill East Line	Suburban Station toward Chestnut Hill East
Terminus	Fox Chase Line (weekends and major holidays)	Suburban Station toward Fox Chase
Terminus	West Trenton Line (weekends and major holidays)	Suburban Station toward West Trenton
Penn Medicine Station Terminus	Chestnut Hill East Line (weekends and major holidays)	Suburban Station toward Chestnut Hill East
Penn Medicine Station Terminus	Fox Chase Line	Suburban Station toward Fox Chase
Penn Medicine Station Terminus	Lansdale/Doylestown Line	Suburban Station toward Doylestown
Penn Medicine Station Terminus	Manayunk/Norristown Line	Suburban Station toward Norristown–Elm Street
Penn Medicine Station Terminus	Warminster Line	Suburban Station toward Warminster
Penn Medicine Station Terminus	West Trenton Line	Suburban Station toward West Trenton
North Philadelphia toward Chestnut Hill West	Chestnut Hill West Line	Suburban Station toward Temple University
Penn Medicine Station toward Wawa Station	Media/Wawa Line	Suburban Station toward Temple University
Overbrook toward Thorndale	Paoli/Thorndale Line	Suburban Station toward Temple University
North Philadelphia toward Trenton	Trenton Line	Suburban Station toward Temple University
Penn Medicine Station toward Newark	Wilmington/Newark Line	Suburban Station toward Temple University
Wynnefield Avenue toward Cynwyd	Cynwyd Line	Suburban Station Terminus
Preceding station	NJ Transit	Following station
Terminus	Atlantic City Line	Pennsauken toward Atlantic City
Former services
Preceding station	Amtrak	Following station
Wilmington toward Washington, D.C.	Metroliner	Trenton toward New York
Paoli toward Chicago	Three Rivers 1995–2005	Trenton toward New York
Paoli toward Chicago	Broadway Limited Until 1995	Trenton toward New York
Wilmington toward Richmond Staples Mill Road	Atlantic City Express	North Philadelphia toward Atlantic City
Ardmore toward Harrisburg	Atlantic City Express	North Philadelphia toward Atlantic City
Trenton toward Springfield	Atlantic City Express	North Philadelphia toward Atlantic City
Philadelphia International Airport 1990-1991 Terminus	Atlantic City Express	North Philadelphia toward Atlantic City
Chester toward Washington, D.C.	Chesapeake	Philadelphia–Suburban Terminus
Overbrook toward Harrisburg	Keystone Service 1981–1988	Philadelphia–Suburban Terminus
Wilmington toward Washington, D.C.	Montrealer	North Philadelphia toward Montreal
Wilmington toward Miami	Silver Star until 2024	Trenton toward New York
Preceding station	SEPTA	Following station
52nd Street toward Downingtown	Paoli/Thorndale Line	Suburban Station Terminus
52nd Street toward Ivy Ridge	Ivy Ridge Line	Suburban Station Terminus
Preceding station	Pennsylvania Railroad	Following station
Narberth toward Chicago	Main Line	North Philadelphia toward New York or Exchange Place
Glenolden toward Washington, D.C.	Philadelphia, Wilmington and Baltimore Railroad	Terminus
52nd Street toward Pottsville	Schuylkill Branch	Suburban Station Terminus
North Philadelphia toward Chestnut Hill	Chestnut Hill Line	Suburban Station Terminus
North Philadelphia toward White Marsh	Fort Washington Branch	Suburban Station Terminus
52nd Street toward Norristown–Haws Avenue	Norristown Line	Suburban Station Terminus
52nd Street toward Paoli	Paoli Line	Suburban Station Terminus
North Philadelphia toward Trenton	Trenton Line	Suburban Station Terminus
49th Street toward West Chester	West Chester Line	Suburban Station Terminus
Darby toward Wilmington	Wilmington Line	Suburban Station Terminus
- Thirtieth Street Station
- U.S. National Register of Historic Places
- Pennsylvania state historical marker
- Built: 1927–1933
- Architect: Graham, Anderson, Probst & White
- Architectural style: Classical Revival
- NRHP reference No.: 78002456

Significant dates
- Added to NRHP: June 7, 1978
- Designated PHMC: December 17, 1996
Location

30th Street Station, officially William H. Gray III 30th Street Station, is a major intermodal transit station in Philadelphia, Pennsylvania, United States. The station opened in 1933 as Pennsylvania Station–30th Street, replacing the 1881 Broad Street station as the Pennsylvania Railroad's main station in the city. The station is the third-busiest Amtrak station in the nation with over 5.5 million passengers as of 2025.

30th Street Station is currently metropolitan Philadelphia's main railroad station and a major stop on Amtrak's Northeast and Keystone corridors. The station is also a major commuter rail station served by all SEPTA Regional Rail lines and is the western terminus for NJ Transit's Atlantic City Line. The station is also served by several SEPTA-managed city and suburban buses and by NJ Transit, Amtrak Thruway, and various intercity operators.

The station served over five and a half million inter-city rail passengers during the 2025 fiscal year (October 2024 through September 2025).

In 2020, the station was named in honor of William H. Gray III, a former U.S. Congressman who represented Pennsylvania's 2nd congressional district from 1979 until 1991.

== Description ==
The station is located at 2955 Market Street in the 30th Street Station District of the University City section of Philadelphia, near both the Schuylkill River and Center City. The building opened in 1933, and has been named to the National Register of Historic Places.

30th Street Station is Amtrak's third-busiest station in the nation, and by far the busiest of the 24 stations in Pennsylvania, serving over four million Amtrak rail passengers and over 12 million SEPTA and NJ TRANSIT rail commuters annually. On any average weekday, 30th Street Station provides train service to over 100,000 passengers.

Amtrak's code for the station is PHL. The station's IATA Airport Code is ZFV, which is used primarily by a codeshare agreement allowing United Airlines to sell Amtrak service between the station and Newark Liberty International Airport.

== History ==
=== 20th century ===
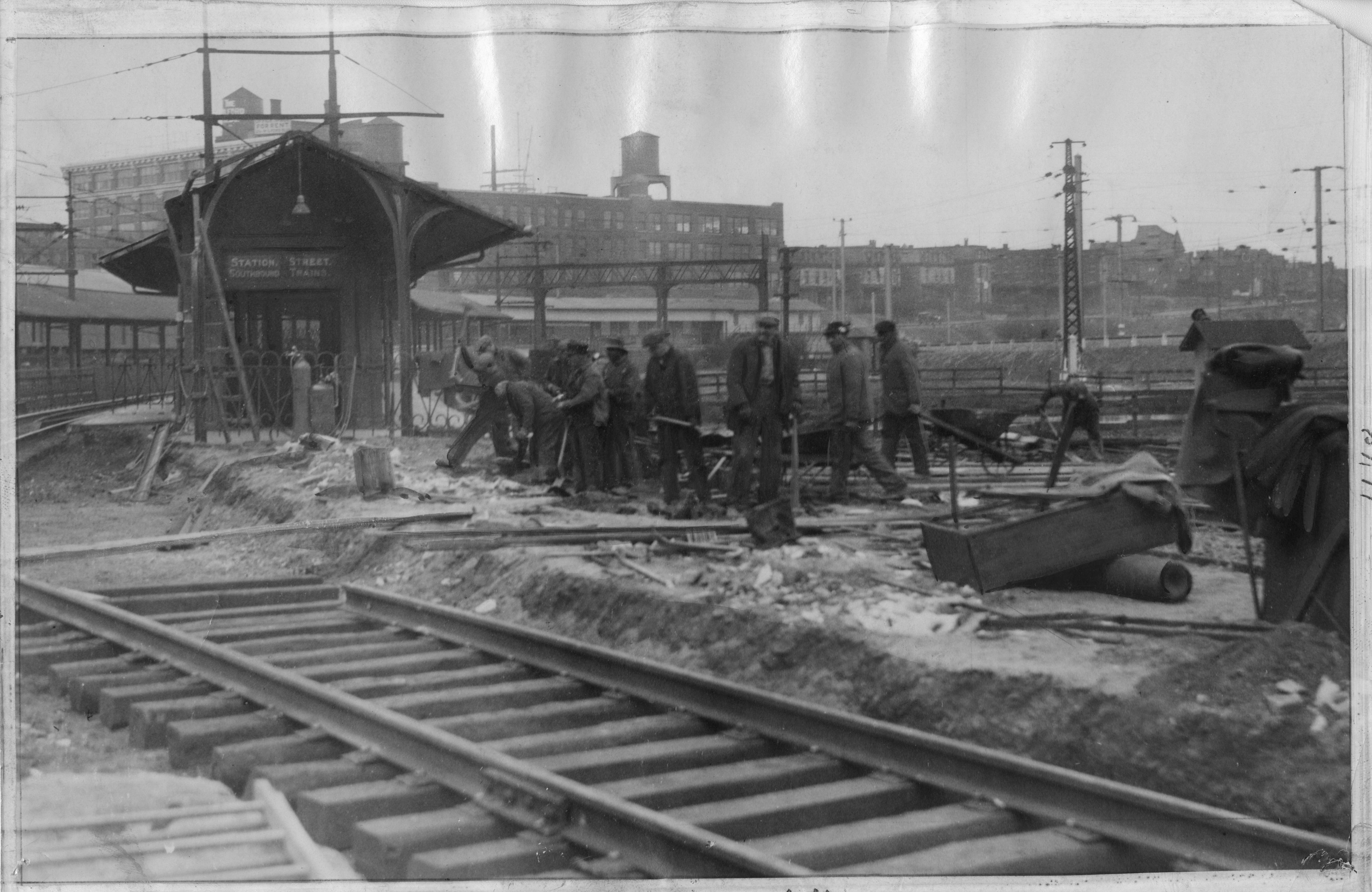
The former West Philadelphia station being removed during construction of 30th Street Station in January 1931

In the early 1900s, the Pennsylvania Railroad (PRR), which was headquartered in Philadelphia, acquired tunnel rights from the Schuylkill River to 15th Street from the city of Philadelphia in return for land that the city needed to construct the Benjamin Franklin Parkway. This eventually allowed the company to replace the inadequate Broad Street station with 30th Street Station, as well as build Suburban Station. The old Broad Street Station was a stub-end terminal in Center City Philadelphia, where through trains had to back in and out, and the company wanted a location which would accommodate trains between New York City and Washington, D.C. Broad Street station also handled a large commuter operation, which the new underground Suburban Station was built to handle.

Construction on 30th Street Station began in 1927 and the station opened in 1933, starting with two platform tracks. Graham, Anderson, Probst and White, the Chicago-based firm that succeeded D.H. Burnham & Company, designed the structure, originally known as Pennsylvania Station–30th Street in accord with the naming style of other Pennsylvania stations. Its design was influenced by the Northeast Corridor electrification that allowed trains to pass beneath the station without exposing passengers to soot as steam engines of earlier times had. The station had a number of innovative features, including a pneumatic tube system, an electronic intercom, and a reinforced roof with space for small aircraft to land, and contained a mortuary, a chapel and more than 3,000 square feet (280 m^{2}) of hospital space. The vast waiting room is faced with travertine and the coffered ceiling is painted gold, red and cream. The building's exterior has columned porte-cocheres on the west and east facades, and shows a balance between classical and modern architectural styles.

Due in part to the Great Depression and World War II, the Broad Street station remained open until 1952. Until 1958, 30th Street Station was one of two major intercity stations in Philadelphia; the other was the Baltimore and Ohio Railroad's station on Chestnut Street. However, Baltimore and Ohio Railroad ended all service north of Baltimore in 1958, making 30th Street the major intercity terminal in the Philadelphia metropolitan area.

==== Solari board ====
In the 1970s, Amtrak installed a Solari board by Solari di Udine in the main waiting room to display train departure information. On November 30, 2018, officials announced that the board—by then, the railroad's last remaining Solari device—would be replaced with a digital board. A minor public outcry followed, and within days, Rep. Brendan Boyle urged Amtrak CEO Richard H. Anderson to reconsider. In January 2019, Amtrak sent the board to the Railroad Museum of Pennsylvania in Strasburg, reserving the right to reclaim it if it could be worked into the station's planned renovation. On February 28, 2019, the new digital board began operation. The Museum placed the Solari board on static display in July 2019; after the renovation it will return as a design element.

=== 21st century ===
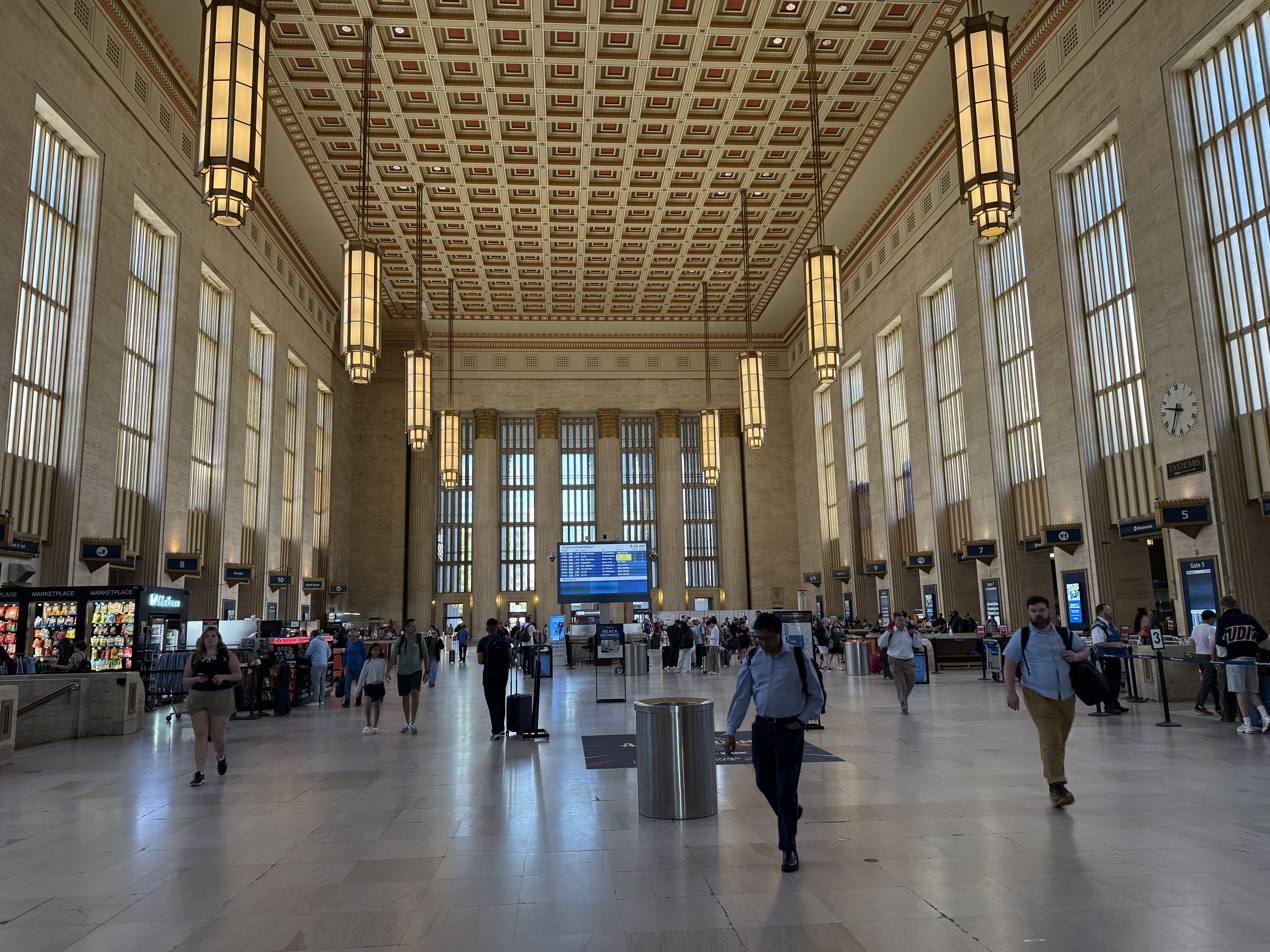
The station's Art Deco style grand concourse

In 2005, Philadelphia-based Pew Charitable Trust asked Amtrak to change the name of 30th Street Station to "Ben Franklin Station" in honor of Benjamin Franklin and as part of the celebration of Franklin's 300th birthday in January 2006. The cost of replacing signs at the station was estimated at $3 million.

In January 2005, John F. Street, then the mayor of Philadelphia, announced his support for the name change, but others had mixed reactions to the proposal. Pennsylvania Governor Ed Rendell, a former mayor of Philadelphia, was lukewarm, while Amtrak officials worried that a "Ben" station could be confused with its other three "Penn" stations. On January 25, 2006, Pew abandoned the campaign, giving no reason.

In August 2014, Congress passed legislation to rename the station William H. Gray III 30th Street Station in honor of William H. Gray III, a former U.S. Congressman from the Philadelphia area. At the time, the change was to occur "in the next few months".

In 2019, signs were installed outside the station with the new name and plans were announced for a statue of Gray and a memorial plaque. The name change officially took effect on February 6, 2020.

The building is owned by Amtrak and houses many Amtrak corporate offices, although Amtrak is officially headquartered near Union Station in Washington, D.C. The 562,000 ft^{2} (52,000 m^{2}) facility features a cavernous main passenger concourse with ornate Art Deco decor.

Prominently displayed is the Pennsylvania Railroad World War II Memorial, which honors Pennsylvania Railroad employees killed in World War II. It consists of a bronze statue of the archangel Michael lifting the body of a dead soldier out of the flames of war, and was sculpted by Walker Hancock in 1950. On the four sides of the base of that sculpture are the 1,307 names of those employees in alphabetical order.

The building was restored in 1991 by Dan Peter Kopple & Associates. When the station was renovated, updated retail amenities were added. They include several shops, a large food court, car rental facilities, Saxbys Coffee, Dunkin' Donuts, and others.

The Amtrak 30th Street Parking Garage was designed by BLT Architects and completed in 2004. This nine-level, double helix garage provides 2,100 parking spaces and glass-enclosed stair tower and elevator to offer views of Philadelphia. The following year in 2005, the Cira Centre office tower was opened between 30th Street and the garage, which was the station's first transit-oriented development built by Brandywine Realty Trust under a ground lease. A pedestrian bridge over Arch Street was also built, connecting from 30th Street Station's upper level to the parking garage and the Cira Centre; this prevents pedestrians from interacting with heavy traffic from PA 3 and I-76.

In 2016, Amtrak, in partnership with Brandywine, Drexel University, and Skidmore, Owings & Merrill Architects, released the 30th Street Station District master plan. Building off of Brandywine and Drexel's Schuylkill Yards project, this 35-year plan envisions a modernized and expanded 30th Street Station capable of hosting 20 to 25 million annual passengers, an expansion of the outdoor plaza, new connections to SEPTA Metro, and a centralized intercity bus terminal. Similar to New York's Hudson Yards, the plan also envisions up to 18,000,000 square feet (1,700,000 m^{2}) of potential development through Schuylkill Yards and expansion over Penn Coach Yard, potentially hosting 10,000 residents and 40,000 jobs.

In 2023, Amtrak, in partnership with Plenary Group, announced that work would start on a $400 million renovation of the station aided by funds from the 2021 Infrastructure Investment and Jobs Act, serving as the first phase of the District Plan. The project encompasses modernized retail and food court spaces, consolidation of ticketing and operations to create more concourse space, expansion of the Market Street "Porch" plaza, renovated Amtrak offices and Metropolitan Lounge, and state of good repair; a direct connection to SEPTA is not in scope. Work commenced in early 2024 and will last until October 2027. The South Concourse, temporarily closed during the renovation, reopened in 2026.

=== Street access ===
Many important highways and streets pass next to or near the station. Vehicles and taxicabs can reach the station from various major routes, including Market Street (PA 3), Interstate 76 (Schuylkill Expressway), and Interstate 676 (Vine Street Expressway). The John F. Kennedy Boulevard Bridge is just east of the station.

=== Rail access ===
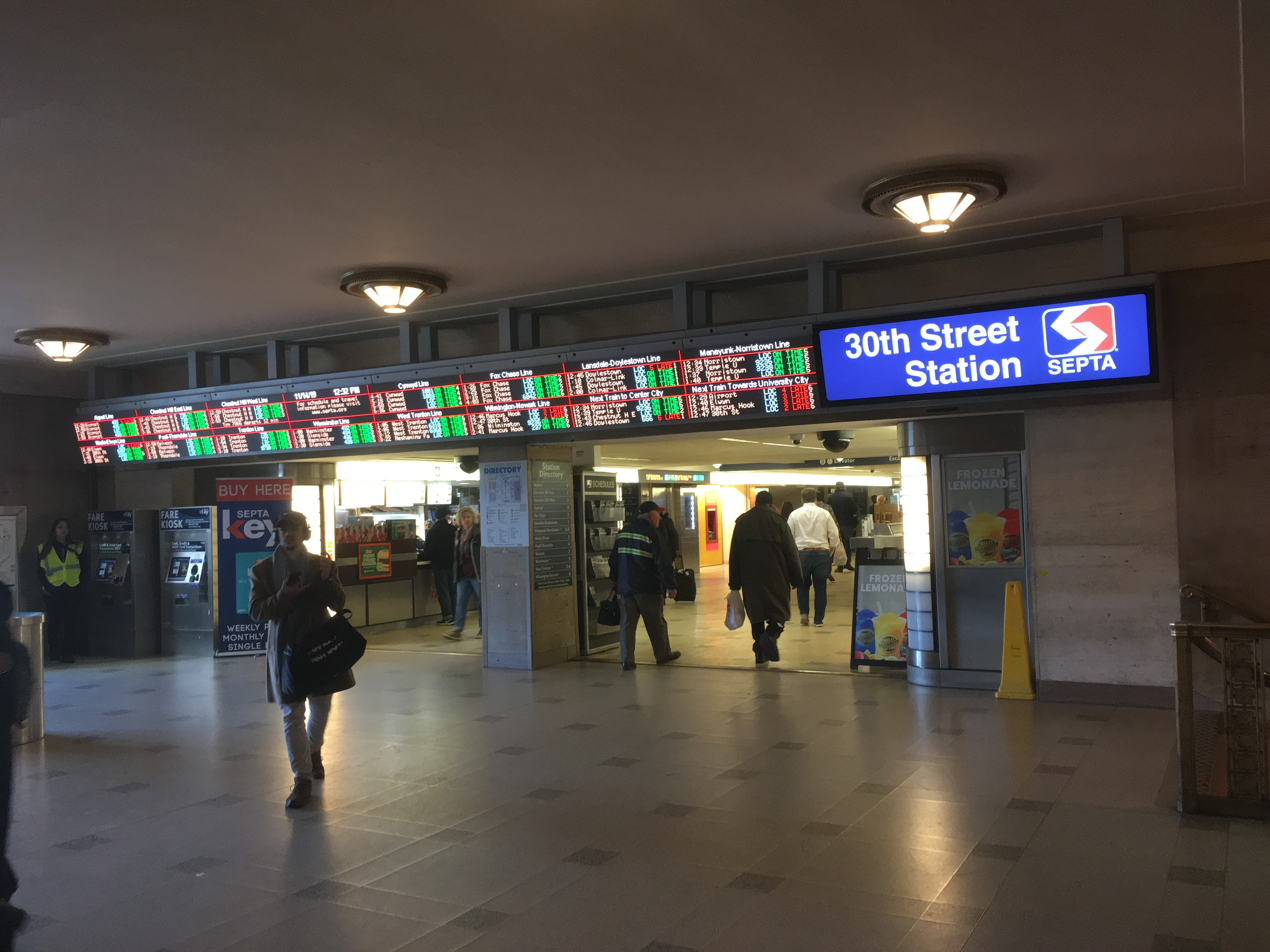
The entrance to SEPTA Regional Rail's concourse at 30th Street Station

Trains from SEPTA, Amtrak, and NJ Transit serve the station. The three east-west Upper Level platforms serve SEPTA Regional Rail; all 13 Regional Rail lines stop at the station. It is one of three stations that are part of the Center City Commuter Connection. The north-south Lower Level platforms serve Amtrak trains, as well as NJ Transit's Atlantic City Line.

SEPTA's Market-Frankford Line (also known as the "L") and all of SEPTA's subway–surface lines (routes T1 through T5) stop at the 30th Street subway station, less than half a block, or 0.1 miles (0.16 km), from the southwest entrance to 30th Street Station. A pedestrian tunnel once directly connected the underground subway station with all five lower level passenger platforms of 30th Street Station. This was closed in the 1980s, reportedly due to safety concerns. SEPTA and Amtrak floated reopening the tunnel in the early 2000s, but the September 11 attacks derailed those plans.

A number of SEPTA bus routes stop at or near the station, including Routes 9, 30, 31, 44, 49, 124, 125, and LUCY (Loop through University City).

=== Cira Centre ===
Cira Centre, a 28-story glass-and-steel office tower opened in October 2005, is across Arch Street to the north and is connected by a skyway at the station's mezzanine level next to the upper-level SEPTA Regional Rail platforms. The tower is owned by Philadelphia-based Brandywine Realty Trust, was designed by architect César Pelli and BLT Architects, and sits on land leased from Amtrak.

== Station facilities ==
=== Metropolitan Lounge ===
The station has an Amtrak Metropolitan Lounge, which is accessible to Amtrak Guest Rewards Select Plus and Select Executive members, Acela Express first-class passengers, sleeping car passengers on overnight trains, and private railcar owners and lessees when the car is being hauled by Amtrak.

=== Rental cars and car sharing ===
Budget Rent a Car, National, Avis, Alamo, and Hertz Rent A Car rent cars at counters in 30th Street Station.

Zipcar vehicles are parked outside 30th Street Station, mostly in reserved parking spaces on the south side of the station or, during construction, in the controlled-access parking lot outside Cira Centre.

== In popular culture ==
30th Street Station is featured in several films including Glass (2019), The Visit (2015), The Happening (2008), Kabhi Alvida Naa Kehna (2006), Unbreakable (2000), Witness (1985), Trading Places (1983), Blow Out (1981), Marnie (1964), The Burglar (1957), and Pride of the Marines (1945).

In television, the station is featured in the recurring opening credits of It's Always Sunny in Philadelphia and in Agents of S.H.I.E.L.D. (season 2, episode 7). It also appears in the 2010 video game Heavy Rain.
