= Cherry Street (Philadelphia) =

Street in Philadelphia, Pennsylvania, US

Coordinates: 39.955577°N 75.16475°W

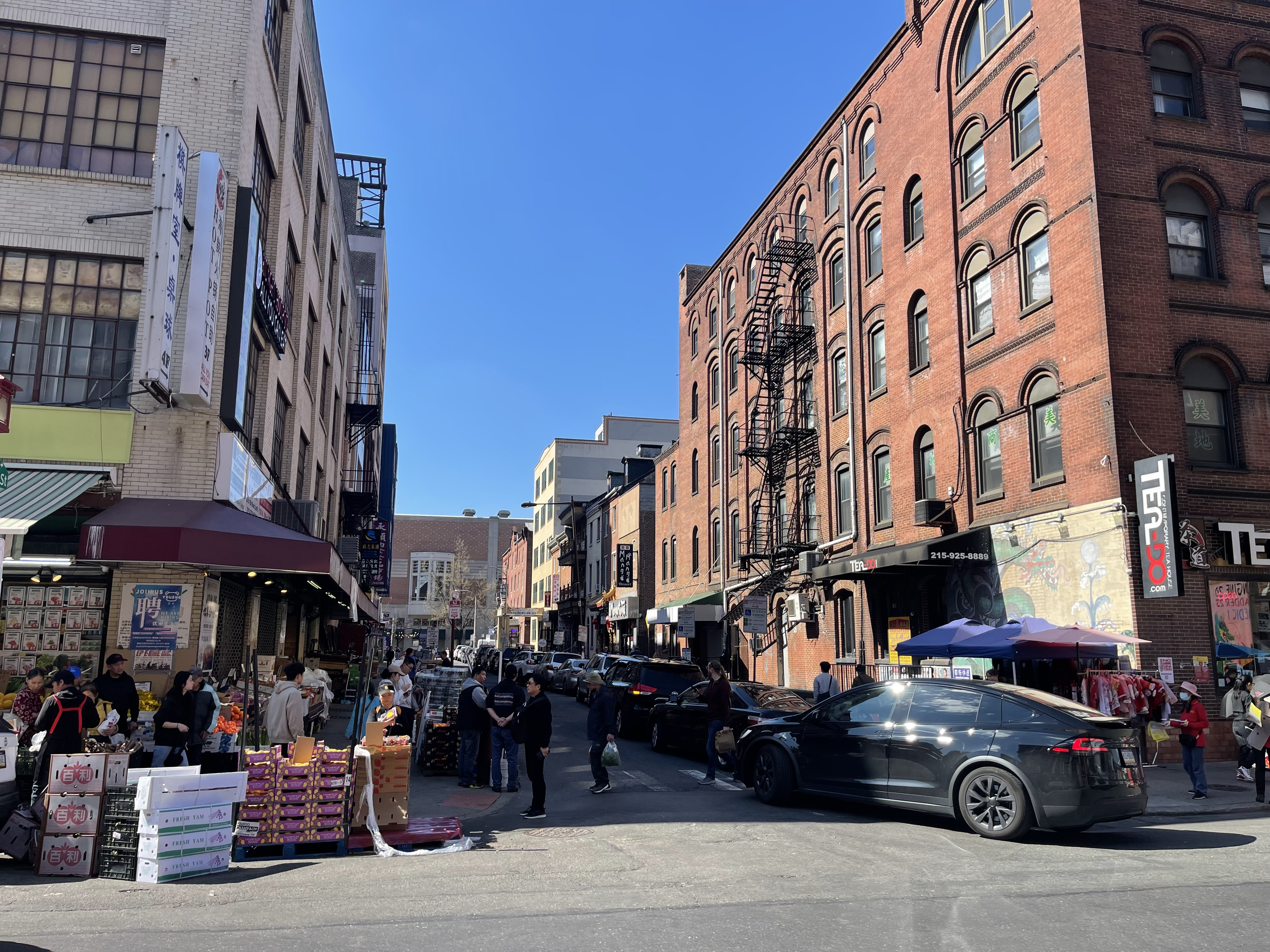
- Cherry Street in Chinatown with the Pennsylvania Convention Center in the back
- Interactive map of Cherry Street
- Maintained by: City of Philadelphia
- Postal code: 19102, 19103, 1904
- North: Race Street
- South: Arch Street

Construction
- Commissioned: 1682

Cherry Street is a minor east-west street in Philadelphia, Pennsylvania, that runs parallel to Race Street to the north and Arch Street to the south. It was not one of William Penn's original gridded streets from the 1680s, and began as an alleyway, bridging from one numbered street to the next. It is listed by name on the map in Birch's Views of Philadelphia (1800) – Race and Arch Streets are listed by their original names, "Sassafras" and "Mulberry." The earliest official use of the name Cherry Street was in 1809.

== Location ==
It is not continuous through the eastern half of Center City. On blocks it did not cut through, minor streets just north or south of it were assigned the name. From Front to 2nd Streets it is called Elfreth's Alley, established in 1702, and purported to be the nation's oldest continuously-inhabited residential street. From Bread to 3rd Streets it was called Fetter Street. From 3rd to 4th Streets it was called Hill Street. From 4th to 7th Streets is it discontinuous because of the U.S. Mint, Independence Mall, and the Federal Reserve Bank of Philadelphia. From 7th to 11th Streets it passes through Philadelphia's Chinatown. From 11th to Broad (14th) Streets it is discontinuous because of the Pennsylvania Convention Center. A half-block of it, from Broad to Carlisle Streets, has been converted into a plaza and sculpture garden for the Pennsylvania Academy of the Fine Arts. It is continuous from Carlisle to 23rd Street (the Schuylkill River), except for a slight jog at the Benjamin Franklin Parkway. It is extremely discontinuous in West Philadelphia; existing only between 32nd and 34th Streets (originally called Howell Street), a half-block between Conestoga and 55th Streets, and between 56th and 58th Streets.

== History ==
In the late-18th century, an early free-black community existed around Cherry Street, between 5th and 6th Streets. Among the residents was former-slave James Oronoko "Noke" Dexter, one of the founders of the African Episcopal Church of St. Thomas. Archaeologists excavated the site of Dexter's house in 2003, prior to the building of the National Constitution Center.

== Points of interest ==
=== Center City ===
From east in Center City near the Delaware River to west (near the Schuylkill River:

- Elfreth's Alley
- Chinatown, Philadelphia
- Pennsylvania Convention Center
- Pennsylvania Academy of the Fine Arts
- Race Street Friends Meetinghouse
- Friends Select School
- Embassy Suites by Hilton
- Cherry Street Tavern

=== West Philadelphia ===
From Drexel University from 32nd to 34th Streets:

- Steinbright Career Development Center
- Design Arts Annex
- North Hall
- Tower Hall
- Race Street Hall (rear)
- Calhoun Hall (rear)

=== Gallery ===
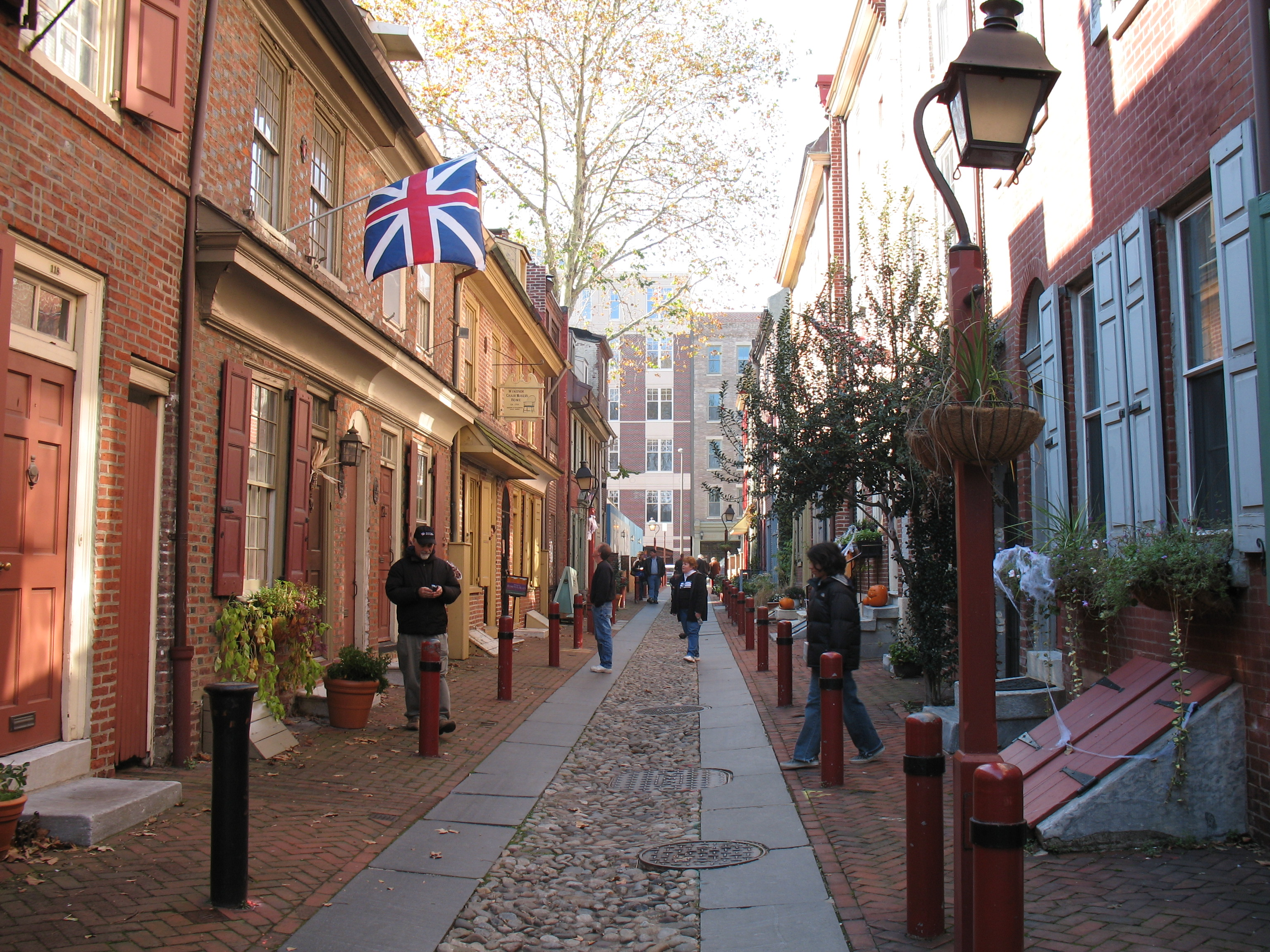
Elfreth's Alley, looking west toward 2nd Street

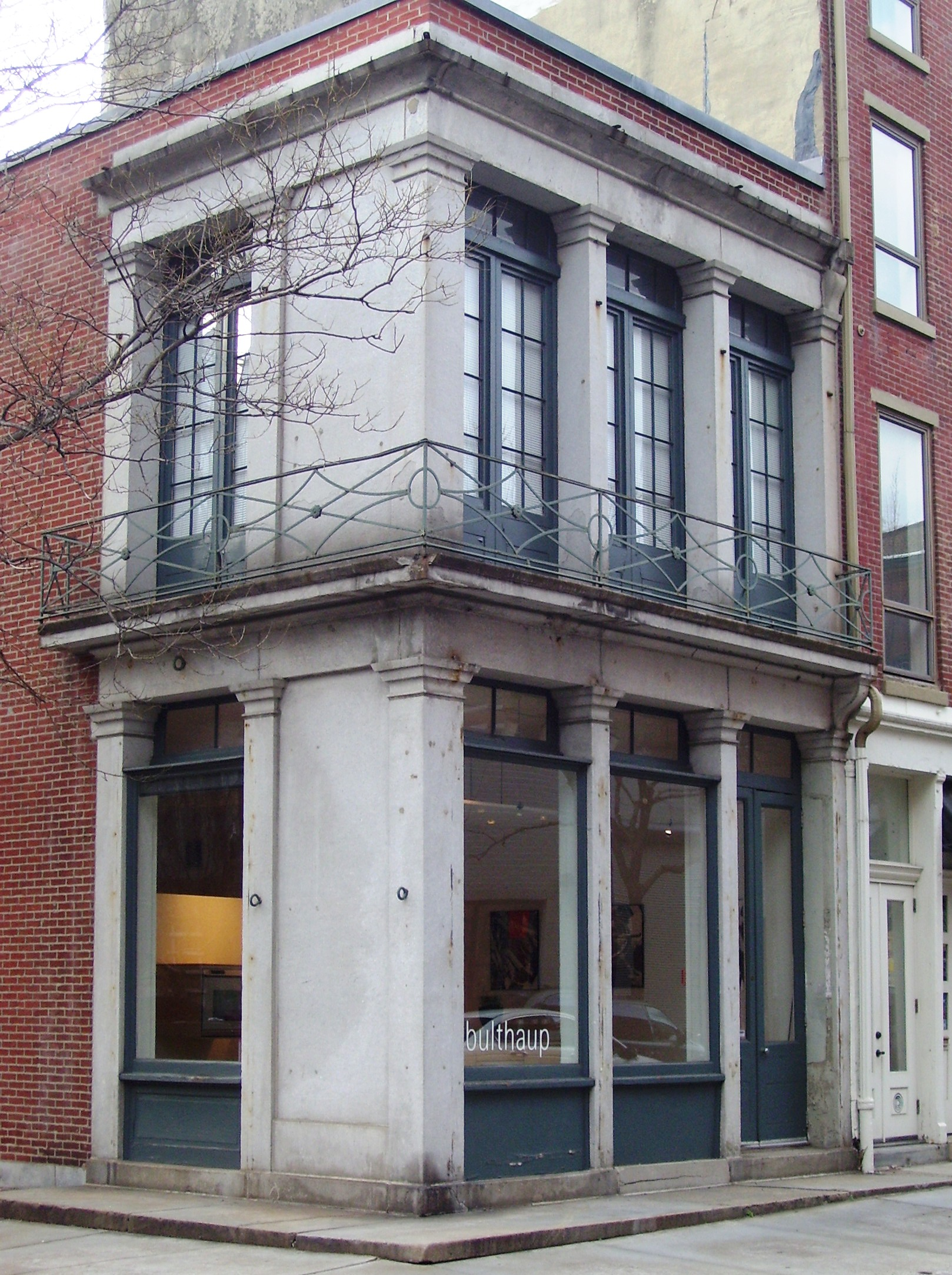
NW corner 3rd and Cherry Streets

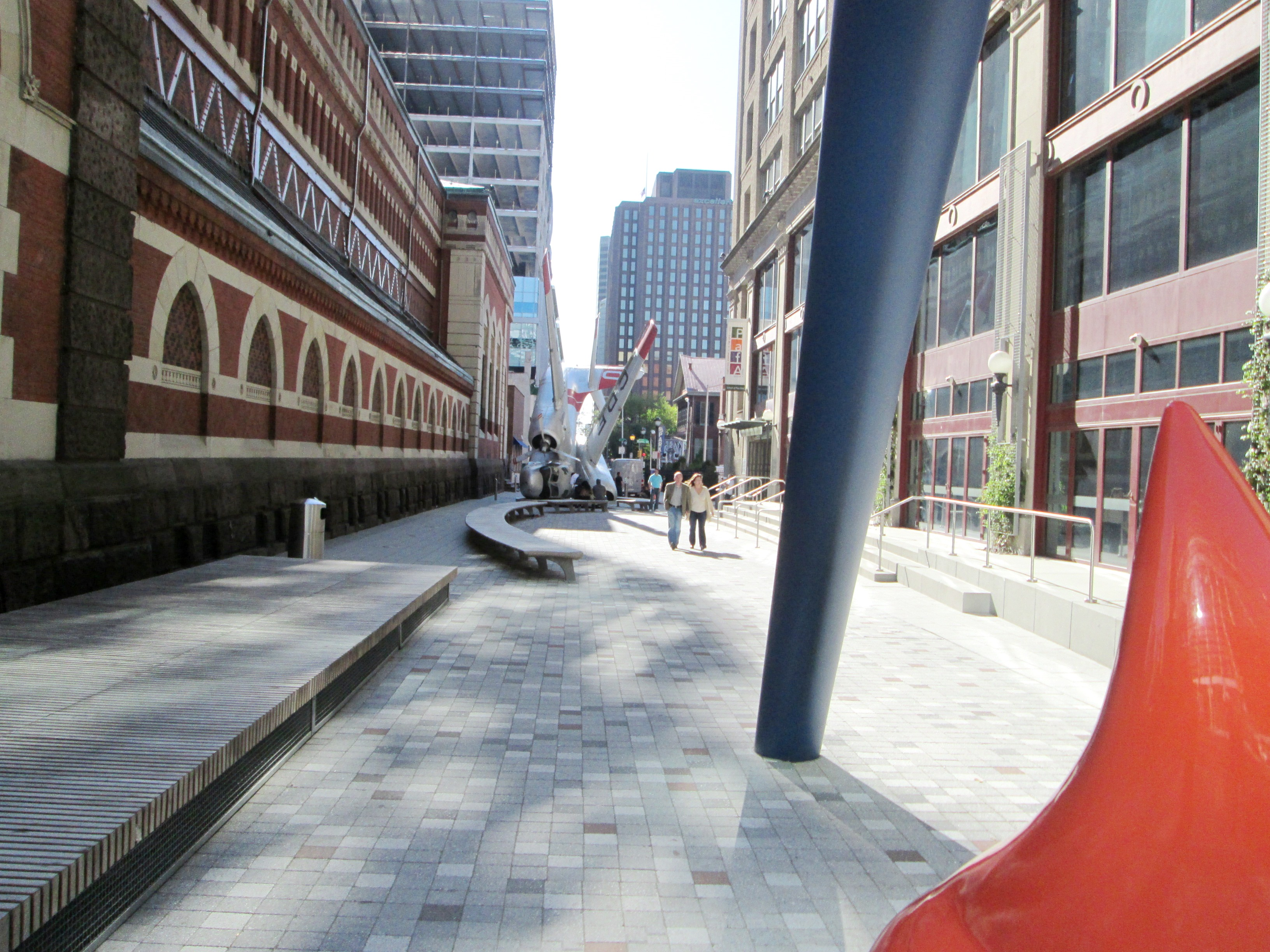
Plaza at Pennsylvania Academy of the Fine Arts

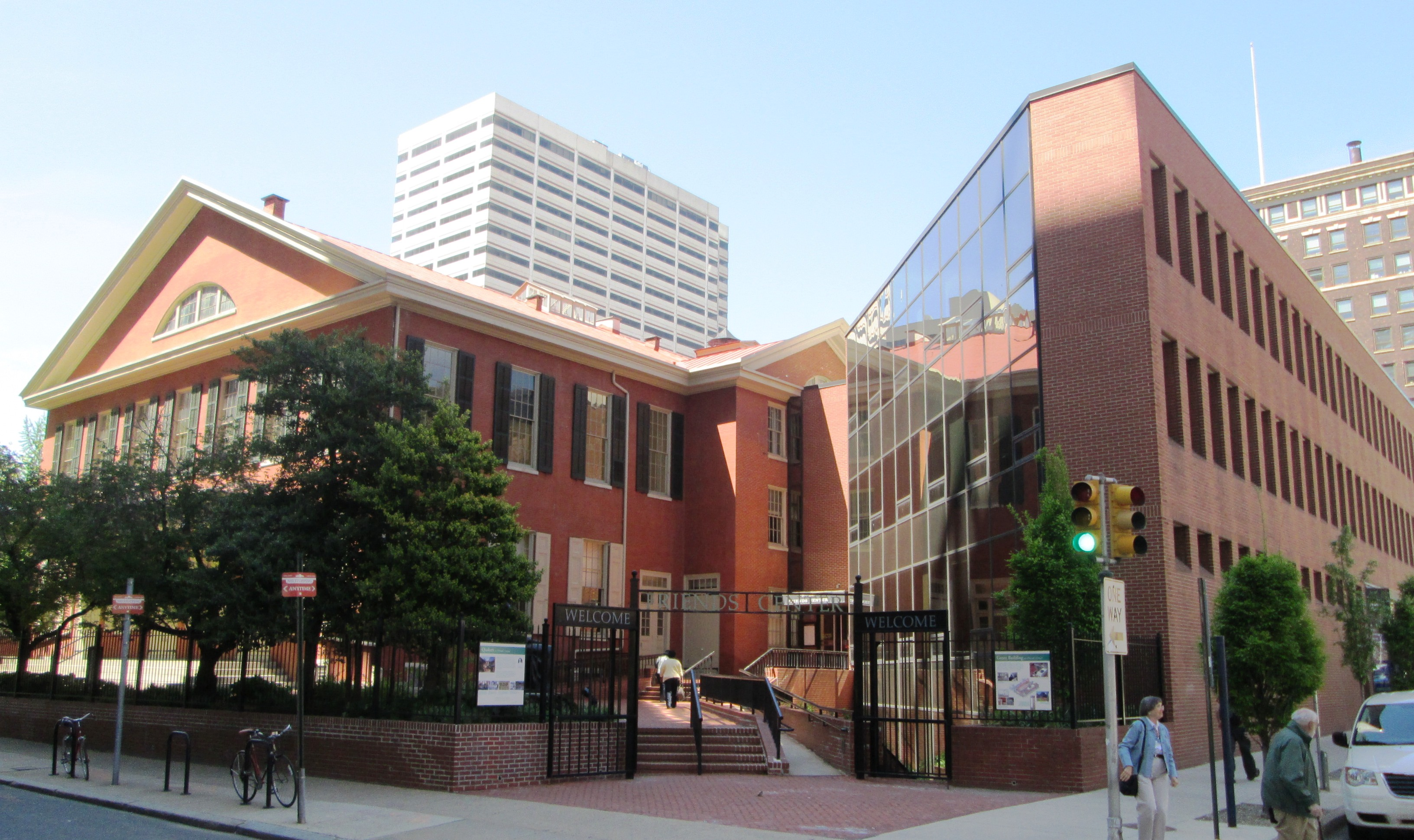
Race Street Meeting House, NW corner 15th and Cherry Streets

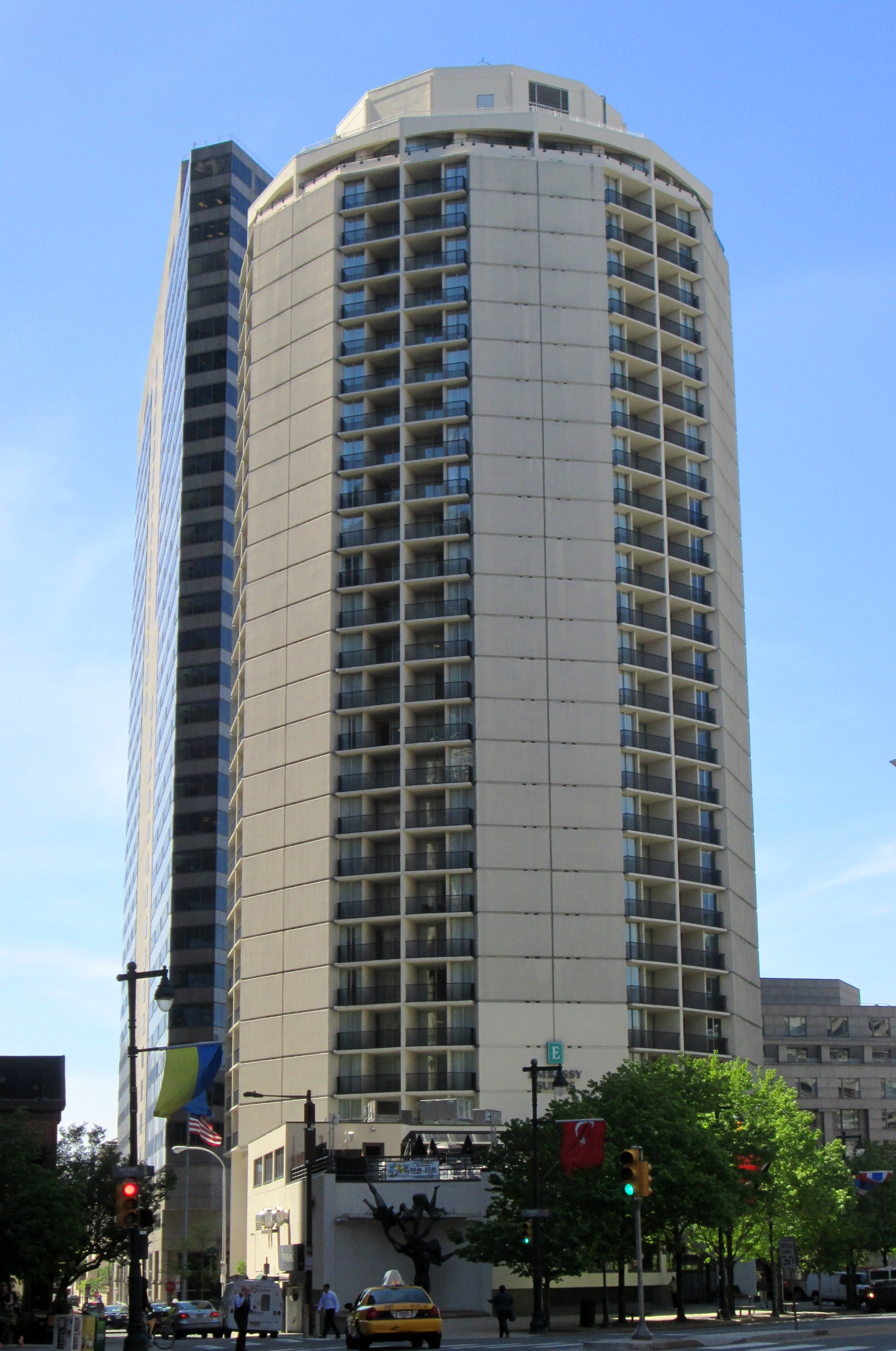
Embassy Suites Hotel, NW corner Cherry Street and Benjamin Franklin Parkway

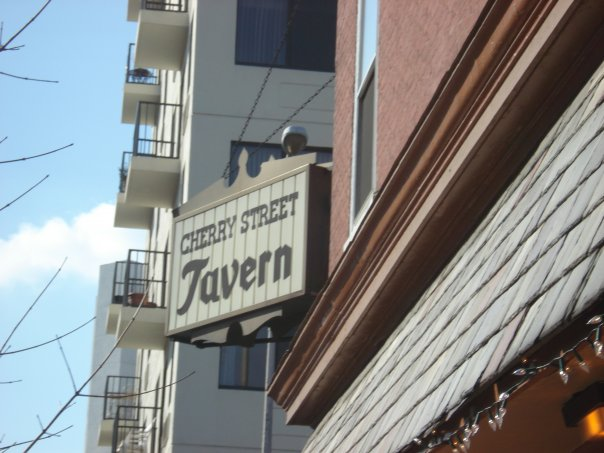
Cherry Street Tavern, NE corner 22nd and Cherry Streets

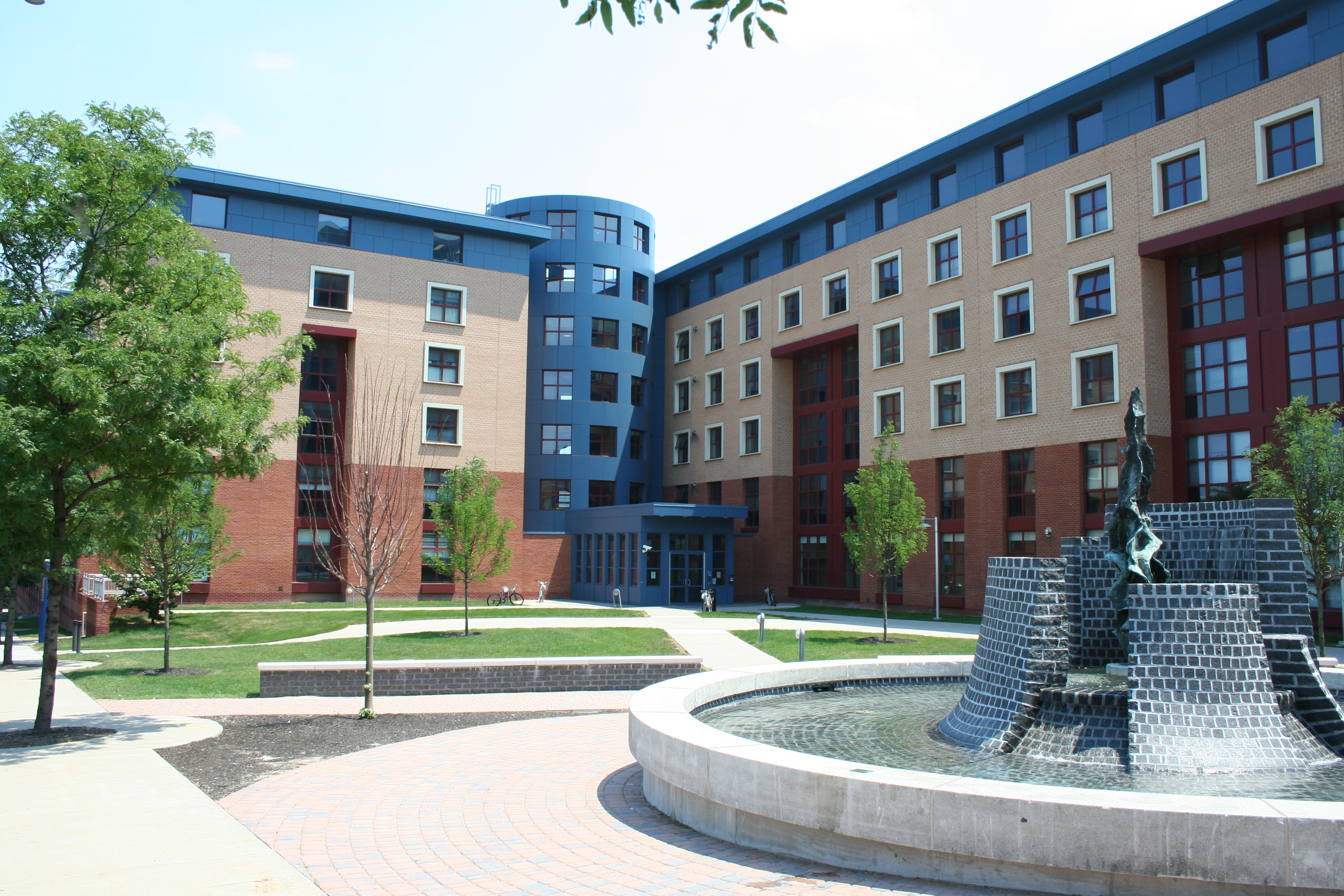
North Hall at Drexel University, NE corner 33rd and Cherry Streets

== See also ==
- History of Philadelphia
