= Arch Street (Philadelphia) =

Street in Philadelphia, Pennsylvania, United States

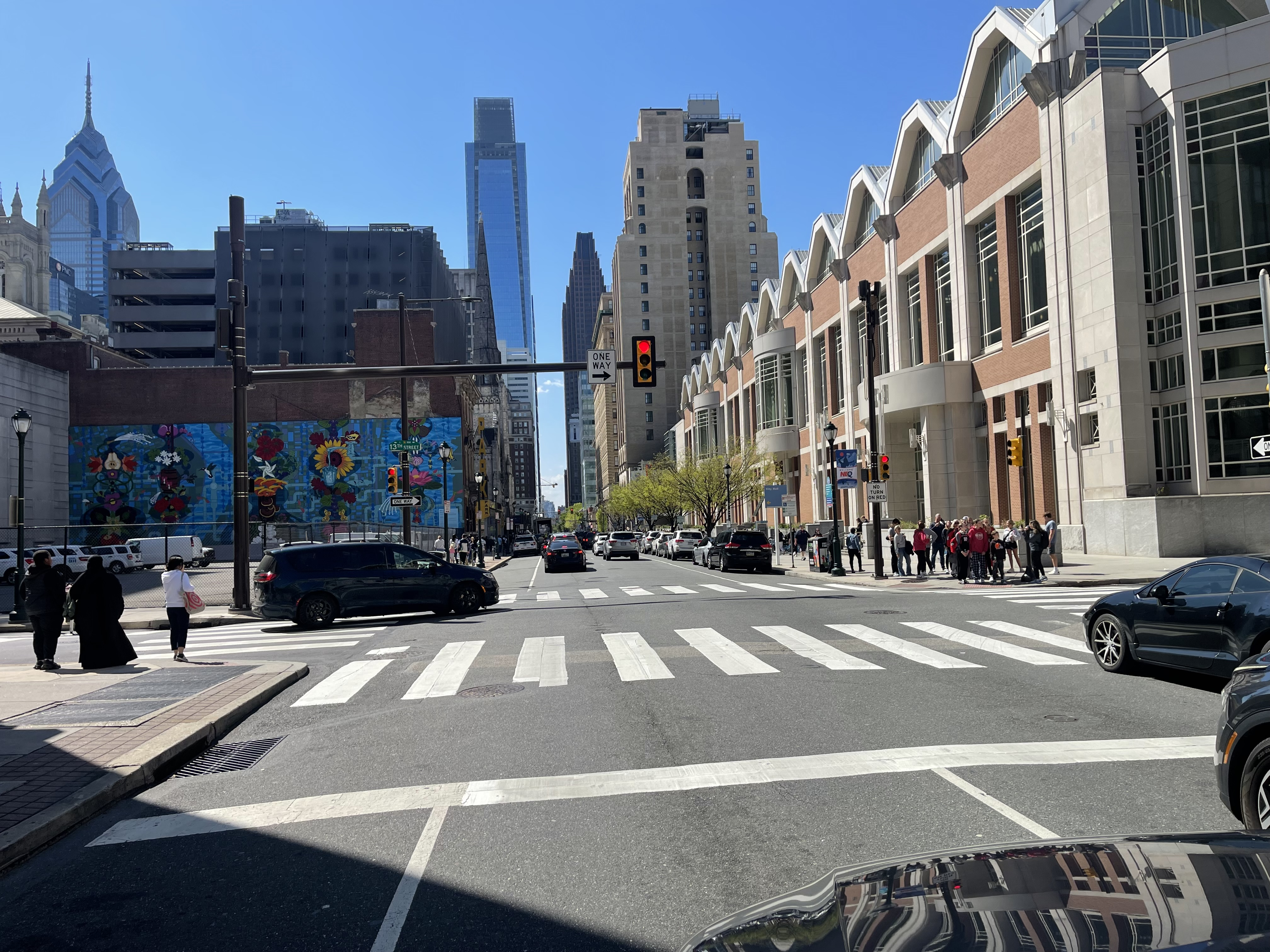
- Arch Street at the Pennsylvania Convention Center with the Comcast Center visible in the background
- Interactive map of Arch Street
- Former names: Mulberry Street; Holme Street; Tioga Street
- Owner: City of Philadelphia
- Maintained by: Streets Department
- Length: 3.7 mi (6.0 km)
- Location: Philadelphia, Pennsylvania, U.S.
- Nearest metro station: 30th Street
- Coordinates: 39.9543°N 75.1618°W
- West end: Gross Street in Overbrook
- Major junctions: I-76 / PA 3 in University City; PA 611 (Broad Street) in Center City
- East end: Front Street in Old City
- North: Race Street (West Phila.); Cherry Street (Center City)
- South: Market Street (West Phila.); JFK Boulevard / Filbert Street (Center City)

Construction
- Commissioned: 1682

Arch Street is a major east–west street in Center City Philadelphia, Pennsylvania, United States.

== Location ==
Arch Street runs from the Delaware River one way westbound through the Old City section of Philadelphia, where landmarks include the Arch Street Friends Meeting House, the Betsy Ross House, Girard Fountain Park, the U.S. Mint, and Christ Church Burial Ground. It crosses Independence Mall at 5th and 6th Streets, traverses Philadelphia's Chinatown neighborhood, and passes Reading Terminal Market.

The tourist areas around Logan Square and the museum district are just north of Arch Street, which ends just east of the Schuylkill River at 23rd Street. West of the river, there is a block of Arch Street between 30th Street Station and Cira Centre. Arch Street also runs eastbound one-way from 49th Street to 63rd Street.

As of 2023, the section of Arch Street from 6th to Broad Streets is part of Philadelphia's High Injury Network, the small fraction of streets on which the majority of traffic deaths and serious injuries occur.

== History ==
The street was called Mulberry Street in William Penn's original city grid, but it was renamed Arch in 1854. Other parts of the street were once called Holme and Tioga streets.

In the 1950s and 1960s, Arch from 6th to 11th Streets was known as Radio Row, after its extensive number of electronic goods stores.

== In popular culture ==
- In 2004 and 2005, on the MTV reality television show The Real World: Philadelphia, the cast resided at 249-251 Arch Street at Third and Arch streets.

== Gallery ==
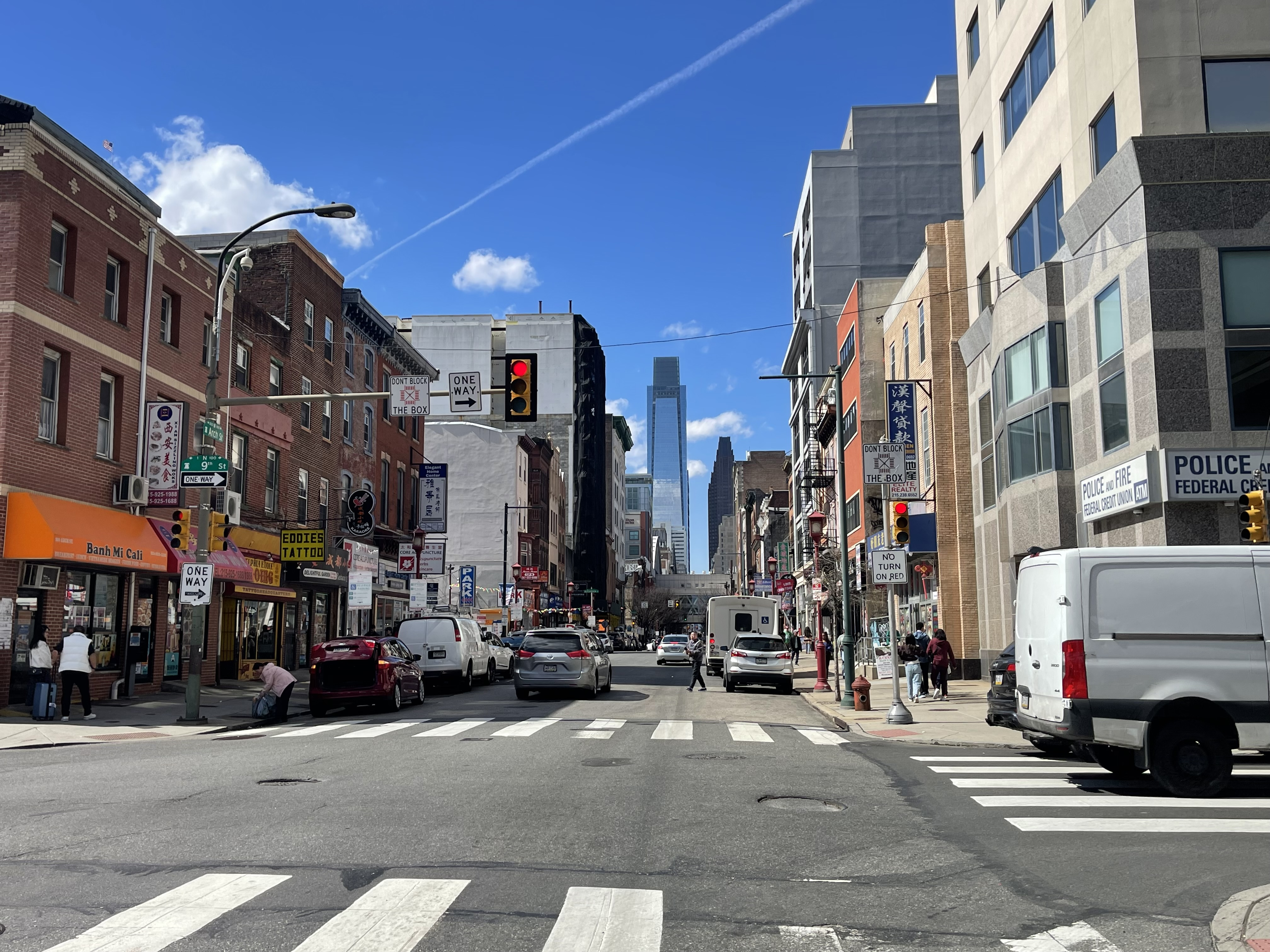
Arch Street in Chinatown

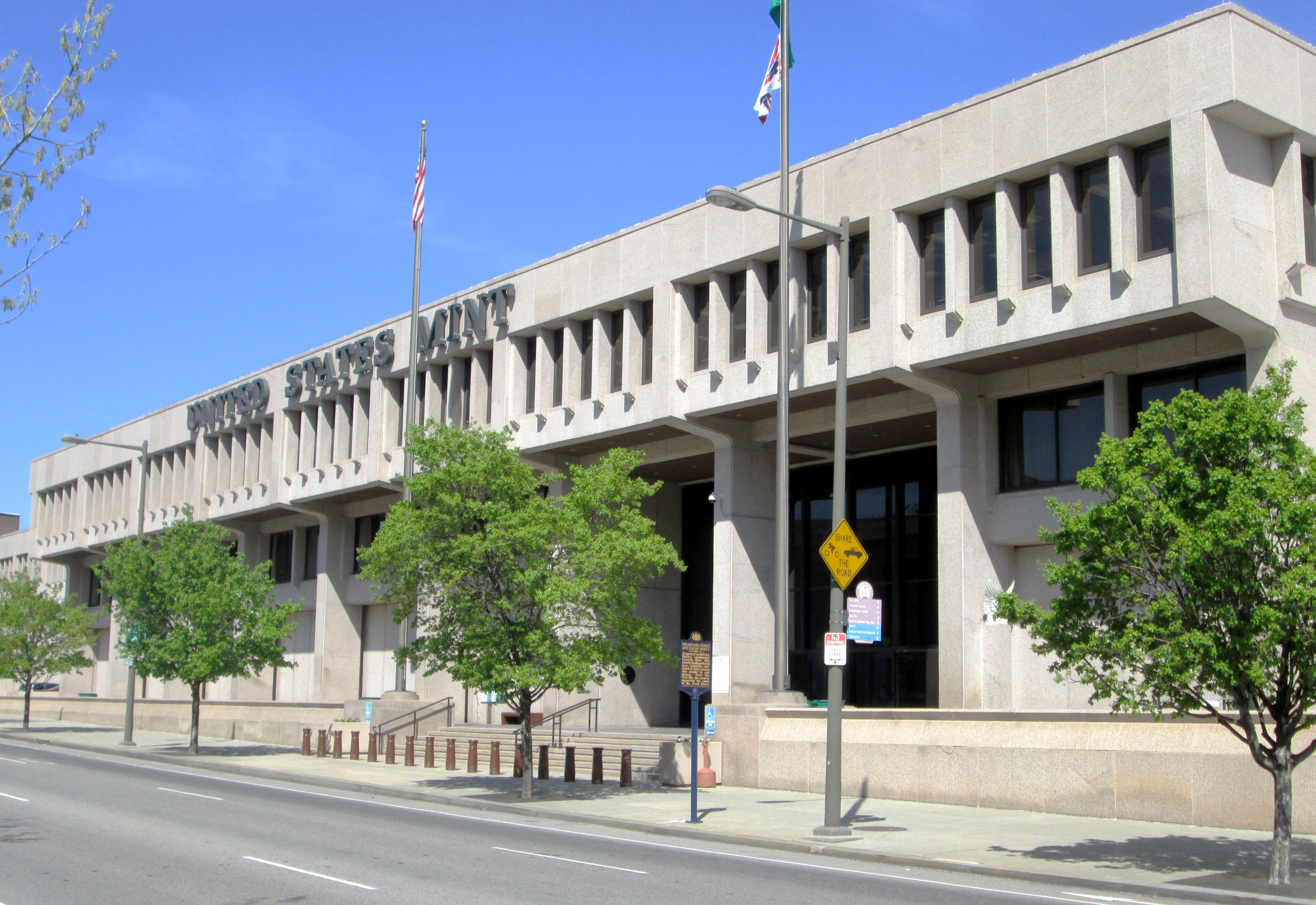
Philadelphia Mint

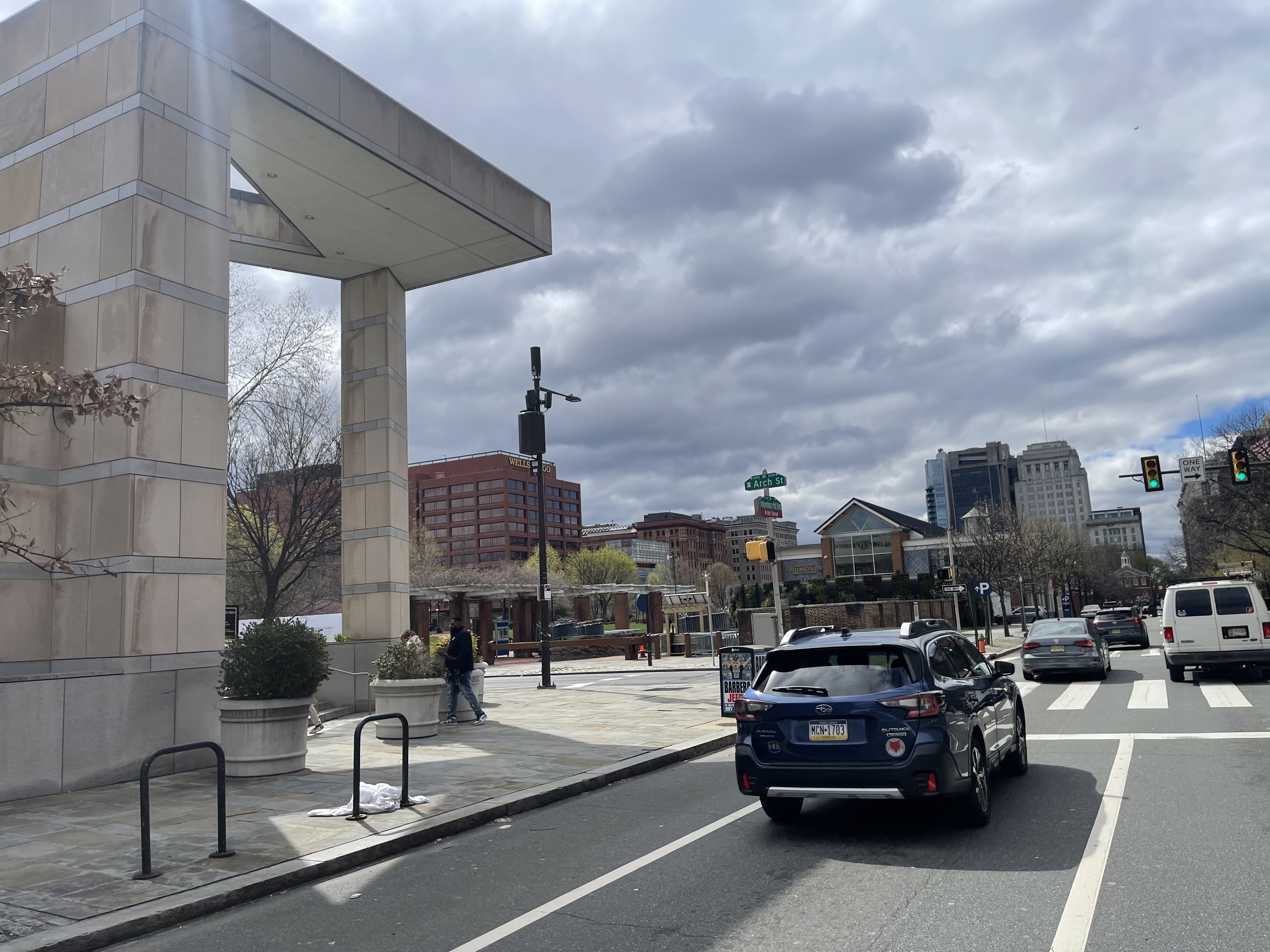
Independence National Historical Park at 6th and Arch Streets
