= Race Street (Philadelphia) =

Street in Philadelphia, Pennsylvania, United States

Coordinates: 39.955577°N 75.16475°W

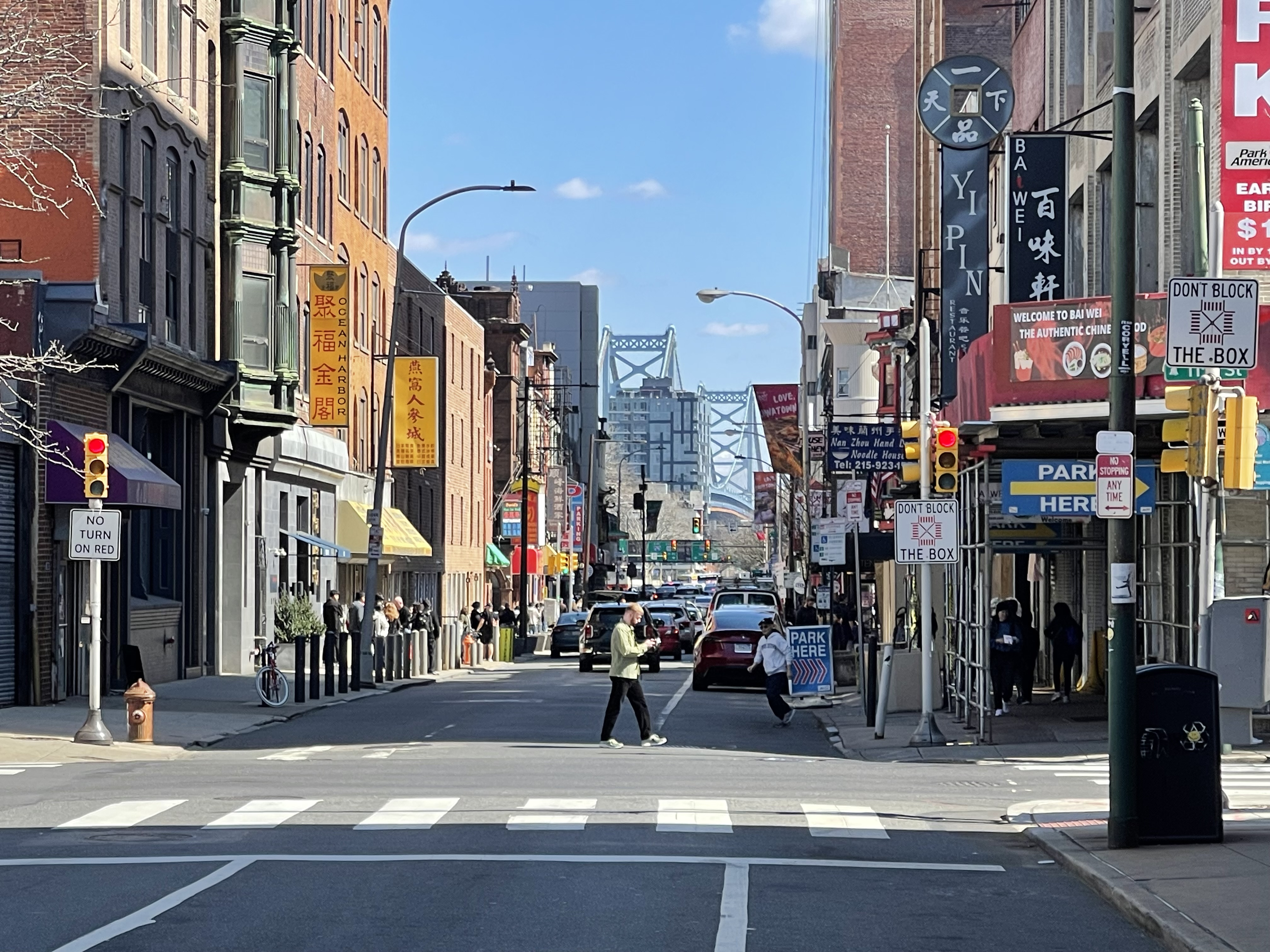
- Race Street in Chinatown with the Benjamin Franklin Bridge in the background
- Interactive map of Race Street
- Maintained by: PennDOT
- Postal code: 19102, 19103, 1904
- West end: 36th Street in West Philadelphia
- Major junctions: PA 611 (Broad Street) in Center City
- East end: Christopher Columbus Boulevard in Old City
- North: Vine Street
- South: Arch Street

Race Street is a major east–west street in Philadelphia, Pennsylvania that runs parallel to Cherry Street. It was one of William Penn's original gridded streets from the 1680s, although named Sassafras Street then. Race and Arch streets are listed by their original names, "Sassafras" and "Mulberry," on the map in Birch's Views of Philadelphia, published in 1800.

== History ==
The name "Race Street" was originally a nickname given to the street, since the street was used for horse racing in Philadelphia in the early 1800s. The name became official some time in the mid-1850s.

== Points of interest ==
=== Center City ===
From east in Center City near the Delaware River to west near the Schuylkill River:

- Elfreth's Alley
- National Constitution Center
- Franklin Square
- Philadelphia Police Department Headquarters
- Chinatown, Philadelphia
- Pennsylvania Convention Center
- Pennsylvania Academy of the Fine Arts
- Race Street Friends Meetinghouse
- Friends Select School
- Cathedral Basilica of Saints Peter and Paul
- Embassy Suites by Hilton
- Franklin Institute

=== West Philadelphia ===
Drexel University Campus, from 32nd to 34th Streets:

- Steinbright Career Development Center
- Design Arts Annex
- North Hall
- Tower Hall
- Race Street Hall (rear)
- Calhoun Hall (rear)

== Gallery ==
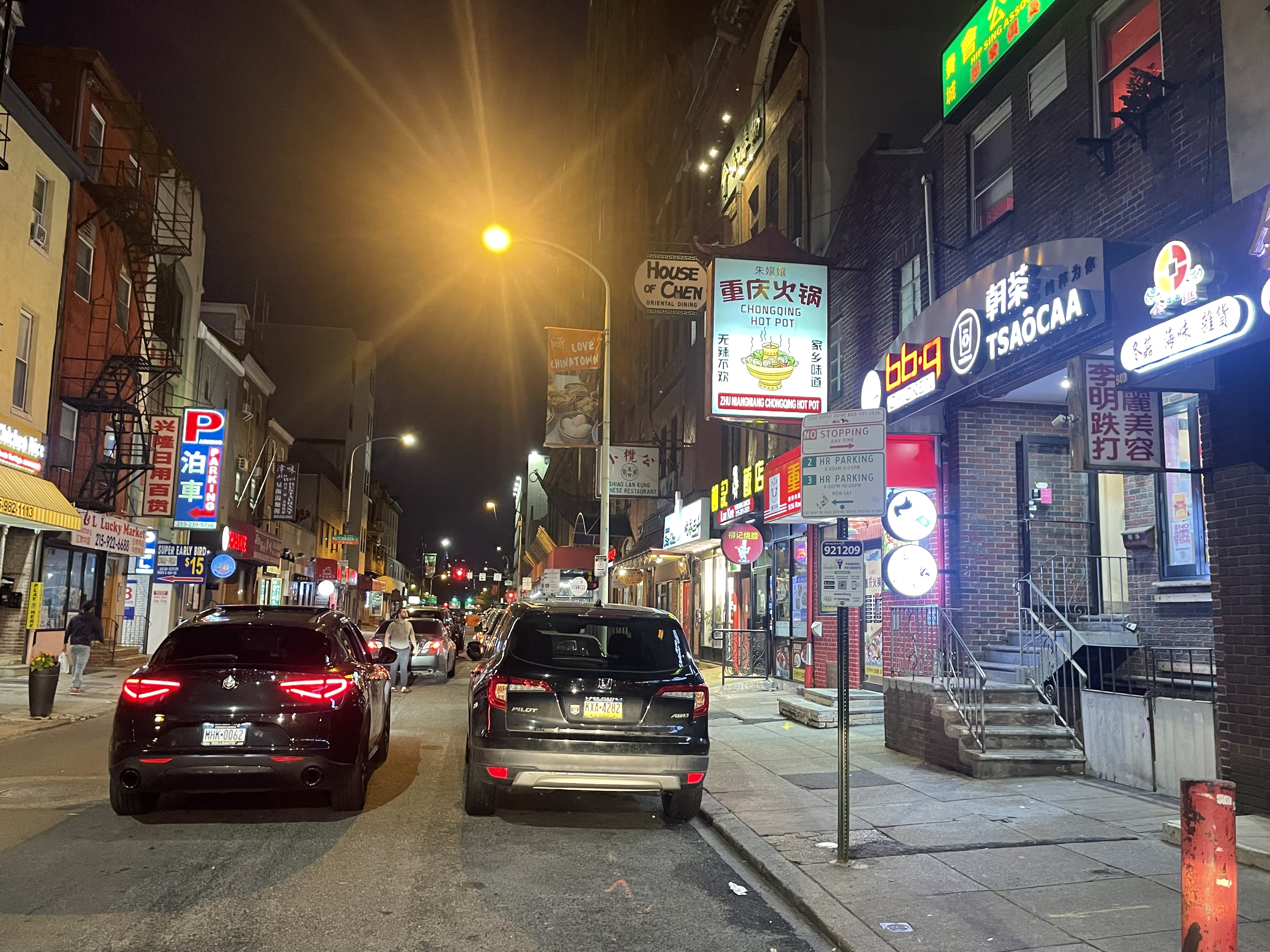
Race Street at night

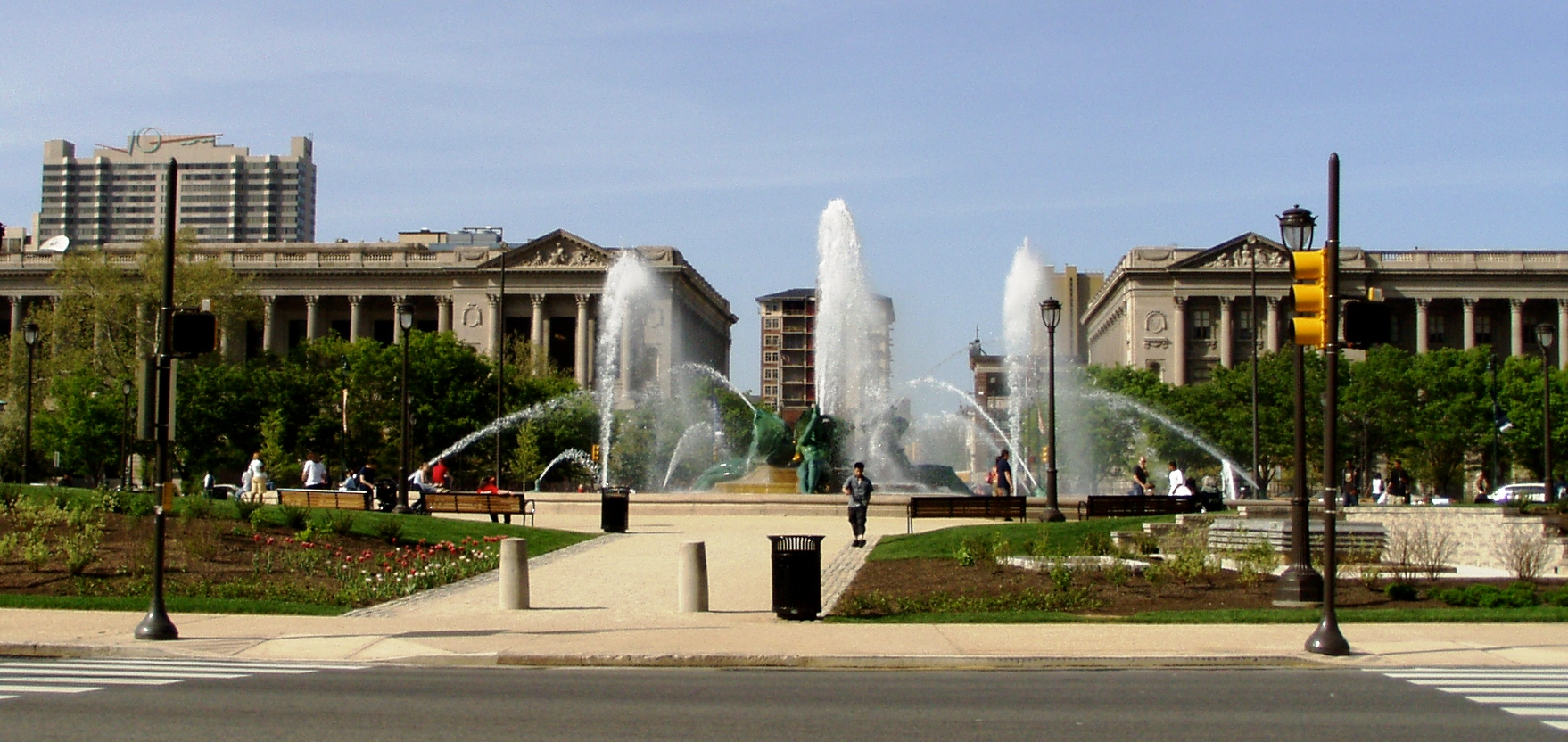
Logan Circle

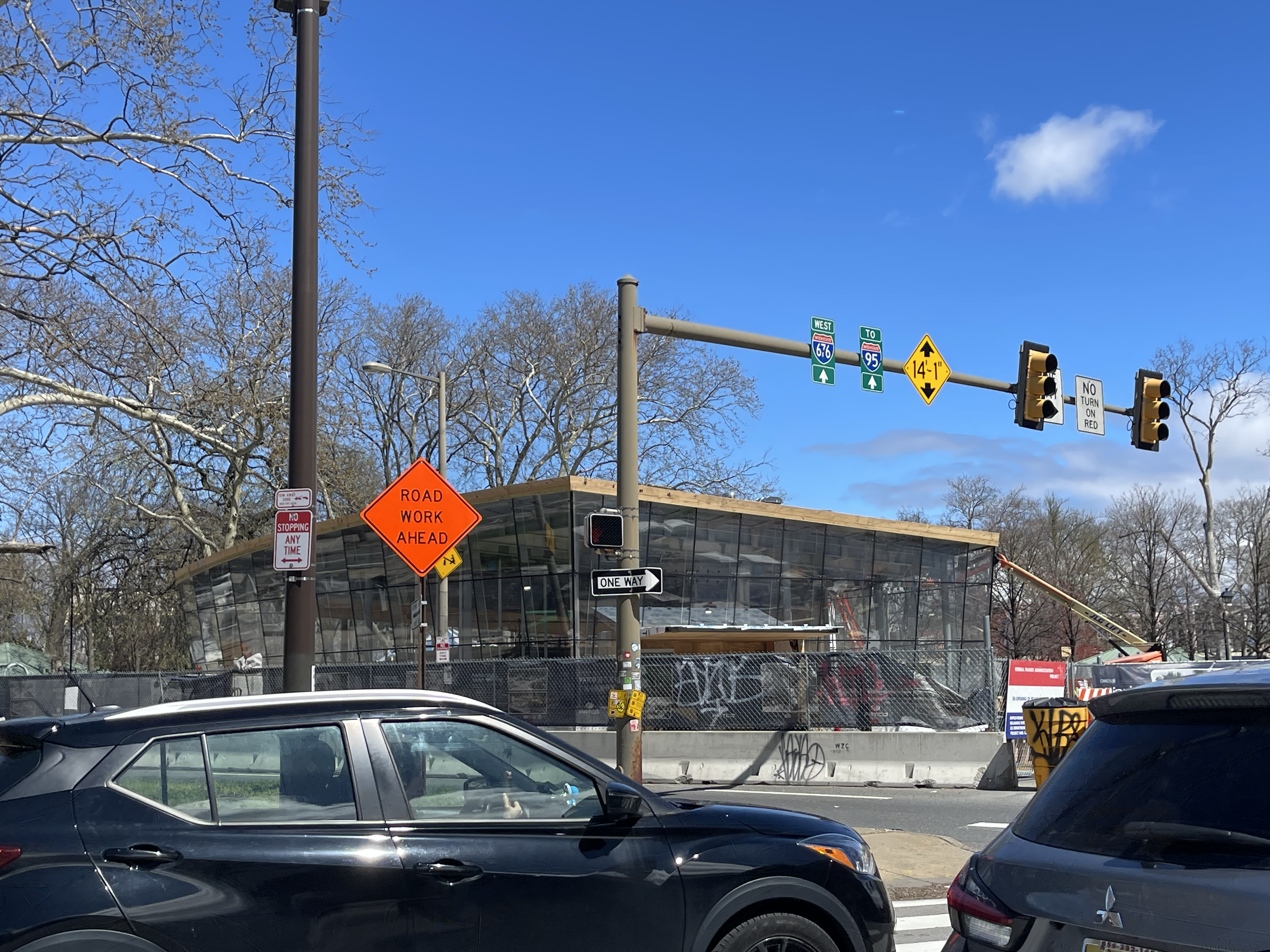
The modern Franklin Square station under construction as viewed from Race Street. It was opened in 2025.

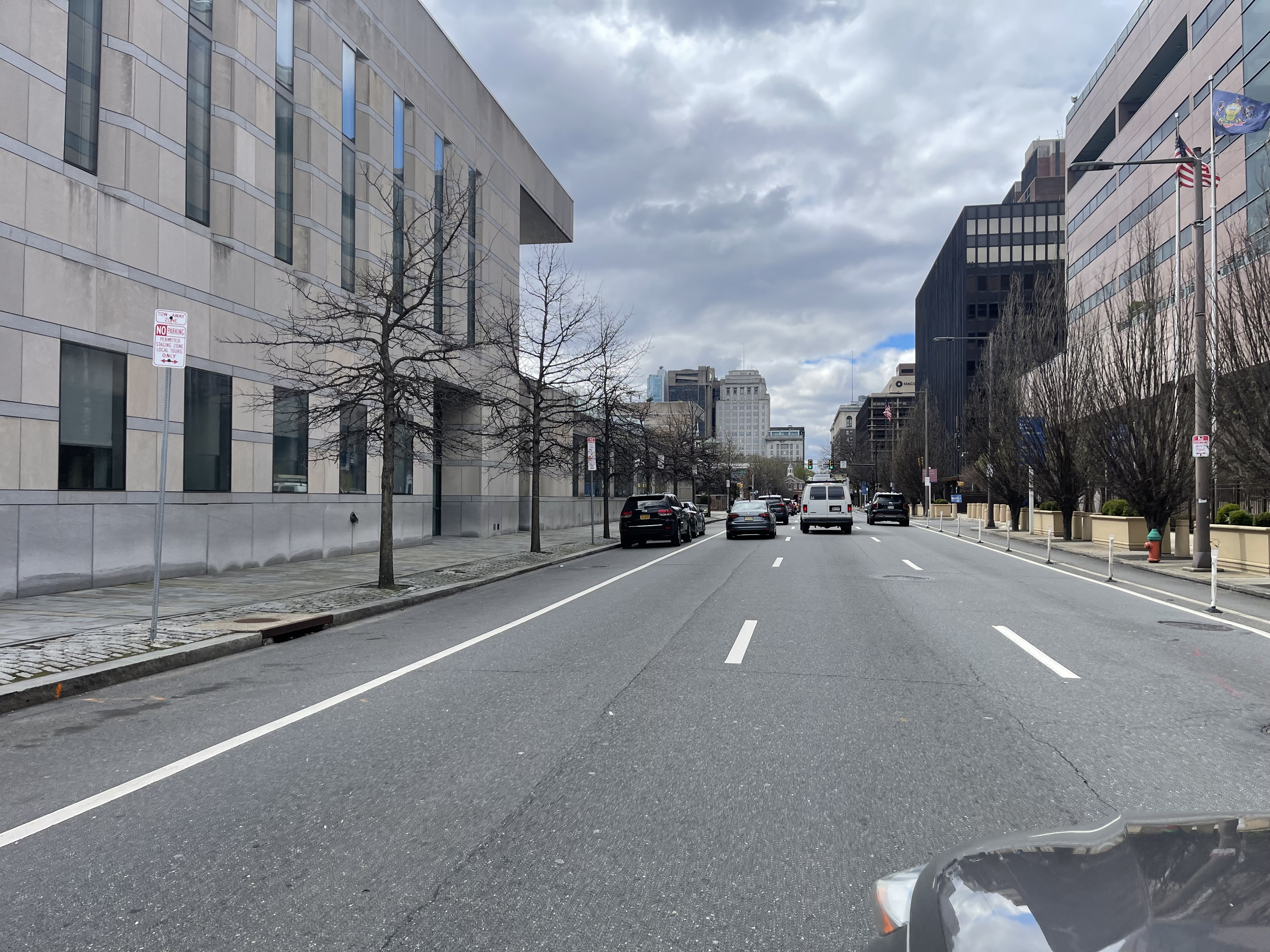
National Constitution Center as viewed from Race and 6th Streets
