= Philadelphia Auto Show =

Coordinates: 39.95283°N 75.15956°W

- Status: Active
- Genre: Auto show
- Frequency: Annually
- Venue: Pennsylvania Convention Center
- Location: Philadelphia
- Years active: 1902–present
- Organizer: Automobile Dealers Association of Greater Philadelphia
- Sponsor: Xfinity, State Farm
- Website: phillyautoshow.com

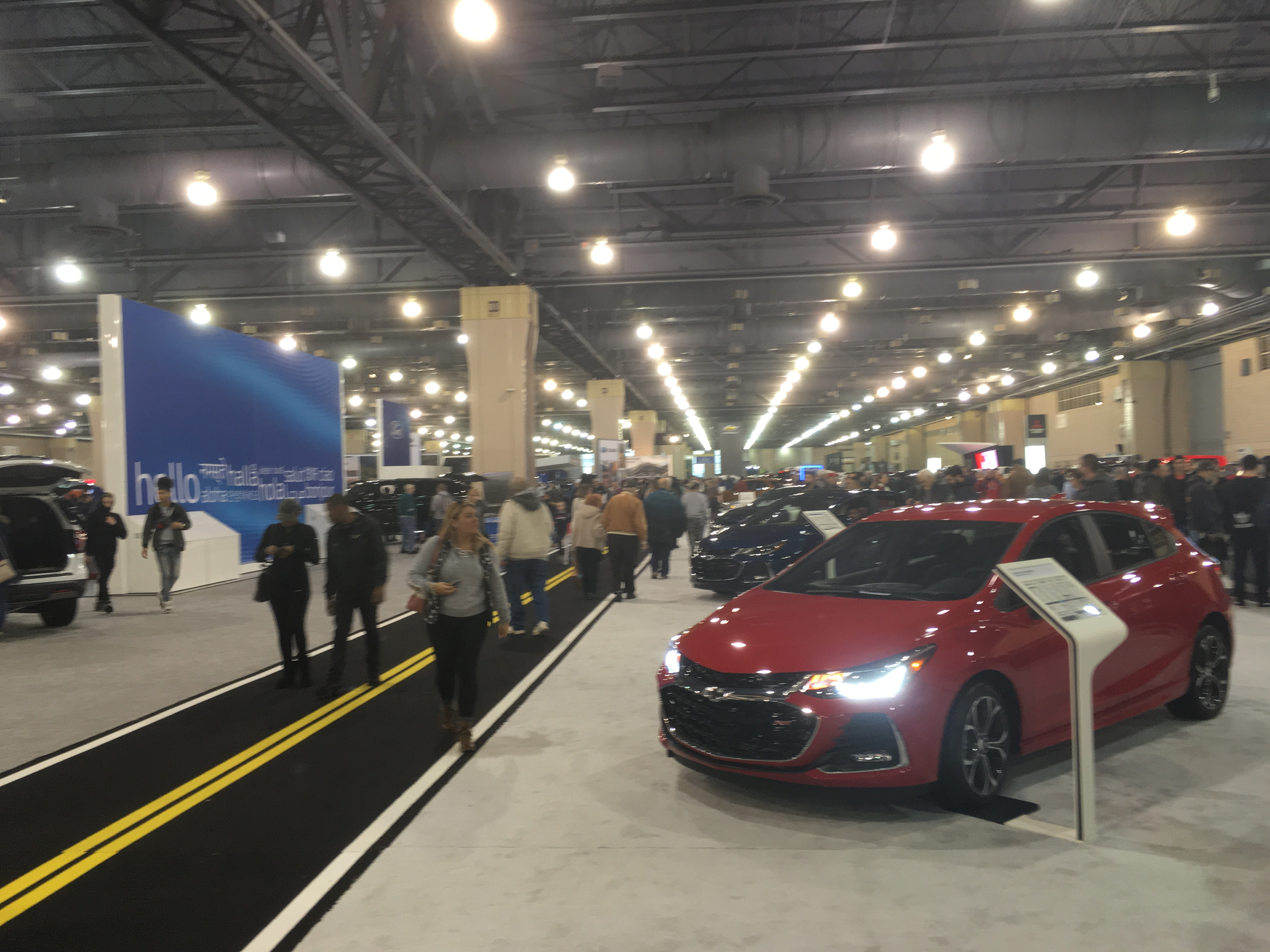
2019 Philadelphia Auto Show

The Philadelphia Auto Show, also known as the Philadelphia International Auto Show, is an annual auto show held in Philadelphia, Pennsylvania at the Pennsylvania Convention Center.

The show debuted in 1902. It is currently organized by the Auto Dealers Association of Greater Philadelphia. It was held in the old Philadelphia Convention Hall and Civic Center on 34th Street in University City.

The Philadelphia Auto Show is produced by the Auto Dealers Association of Greater Philadelphia, and held annually at the Pennsylvania Convention Center in Center City, Philadelphia. The Auto Show has grown dramatically over the past seven years, welcoming more than 250,000 visitors each year. The Auto Show exit survey shows 48% of the area's new car sales are directly influenced by the show. The show, which uses 600,000 square feet (56,000 m^{2}) of the Convention Center, features over 700 vehicles with a laundry list of new vehicle debuts, concepts, exotics, tuners and antique automobiles.

== The Black Tie Gala ==
The Philadelphia Auto Show's Black Tie Tailgate Preview Gala is held on the Friday night prior to the start of the auto show. Ticket proceeds from the Black Tie Gala benefit Children's Hospital of Philadelphia (CHOP) through the Auto Dealers CARing for Kids Foundation, which contributes funding and resources for child-related programs and causes throughout the Philadelphia region.

The Black Tie Tailgate was not held in 2022.
