= Pennsylvania Convention Center =

Multi-use facility in Philadelphia

Coordinates: 39.95494°N 75.16015°W

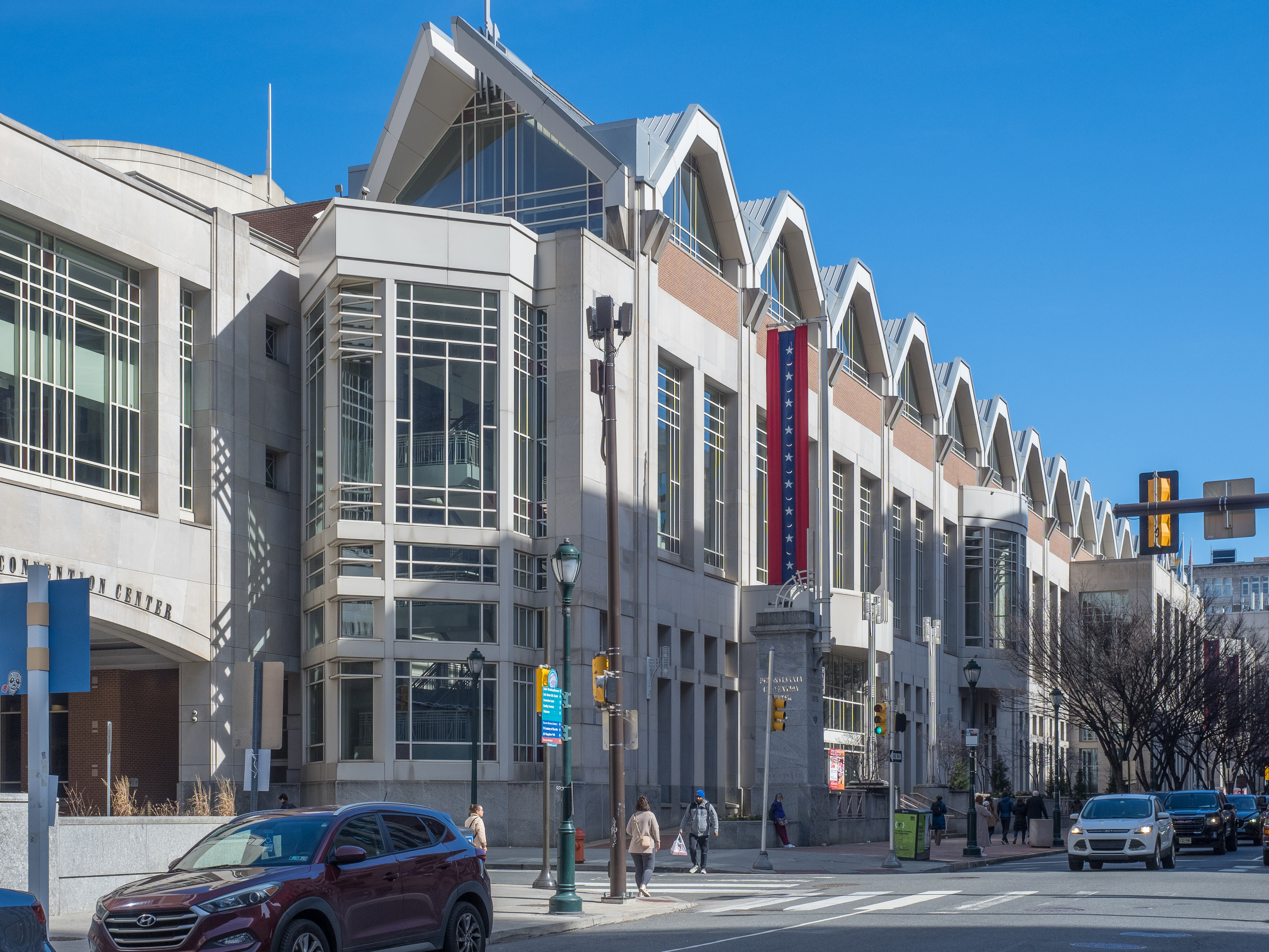
- The Pennsylvania Convention Center from 13th and Arch streets looking east in March 2024
- Interactive map of Pennsylvania Convention Center
- Address: 1101 Arch Street
- Location: Philadelphia, Pennsylvania, U.S.
- Operator: ASM Global
- Capacity: 5,040 (Terrace Ballroom); 40,210 (Level 200 Exhibit Hall)
- Public transit: 11th Street station : L Race-Vine: B Jefferson Station: SEPTA Regional Rail; SEPTA bus: 4, 16, 17, 23, 27, 33, 38, 44, 45, 48, 61, 124, 125; NJ Transit bus: 400, 401, 402, 404, 406, 408, 409, 410, 412, 414, 417; Philly PHLASH

Construction
- Opened: 1993
- Renovated: 2011
- Expanded: 2011

Website
- www.paconvention.com

The Pennsylvania Convention Center is a multi-use public facility in the Market East section of Philadelphia, Pennsylvania, designed to accommodate conventions, exhibitions, conferences and other events. The L-shaped complex occupies four city blocks.

== History ==
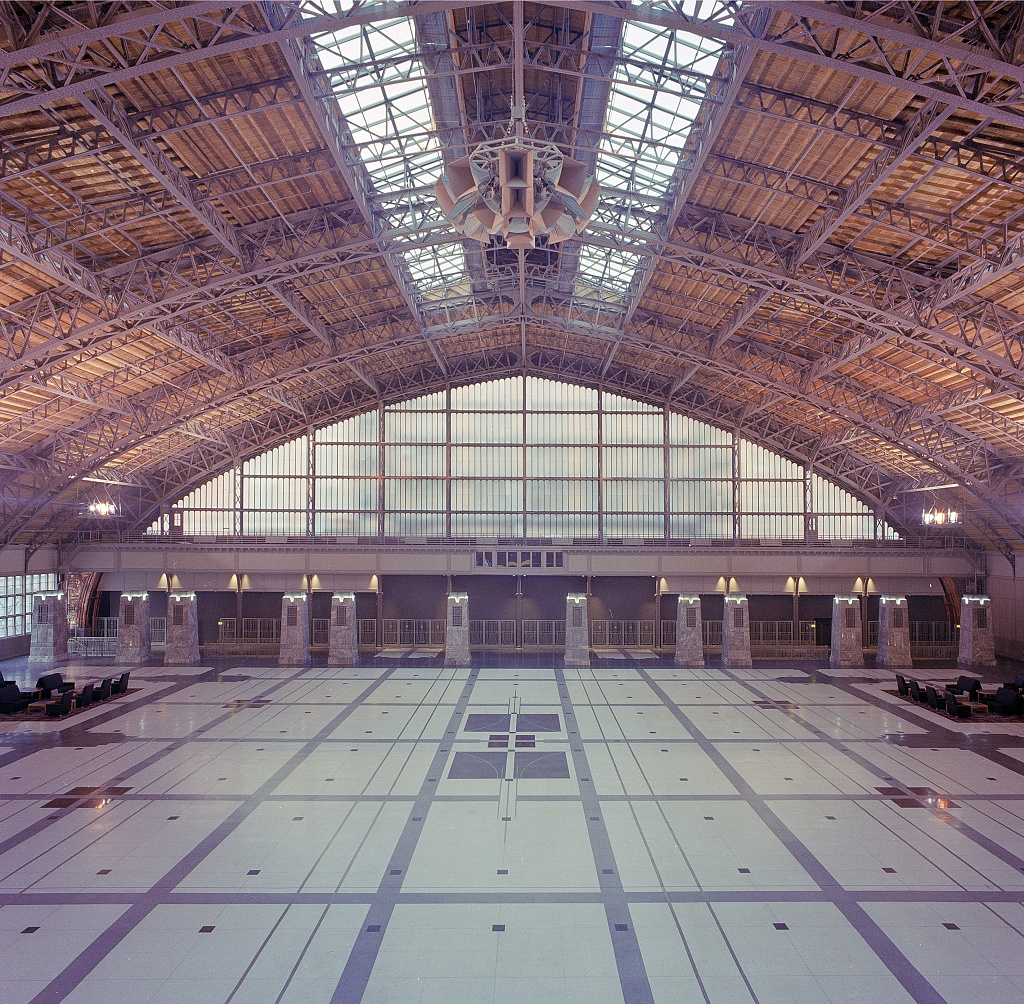
Grand Hall at the Pennsylvania Convention Center in Philadelphia in 1993

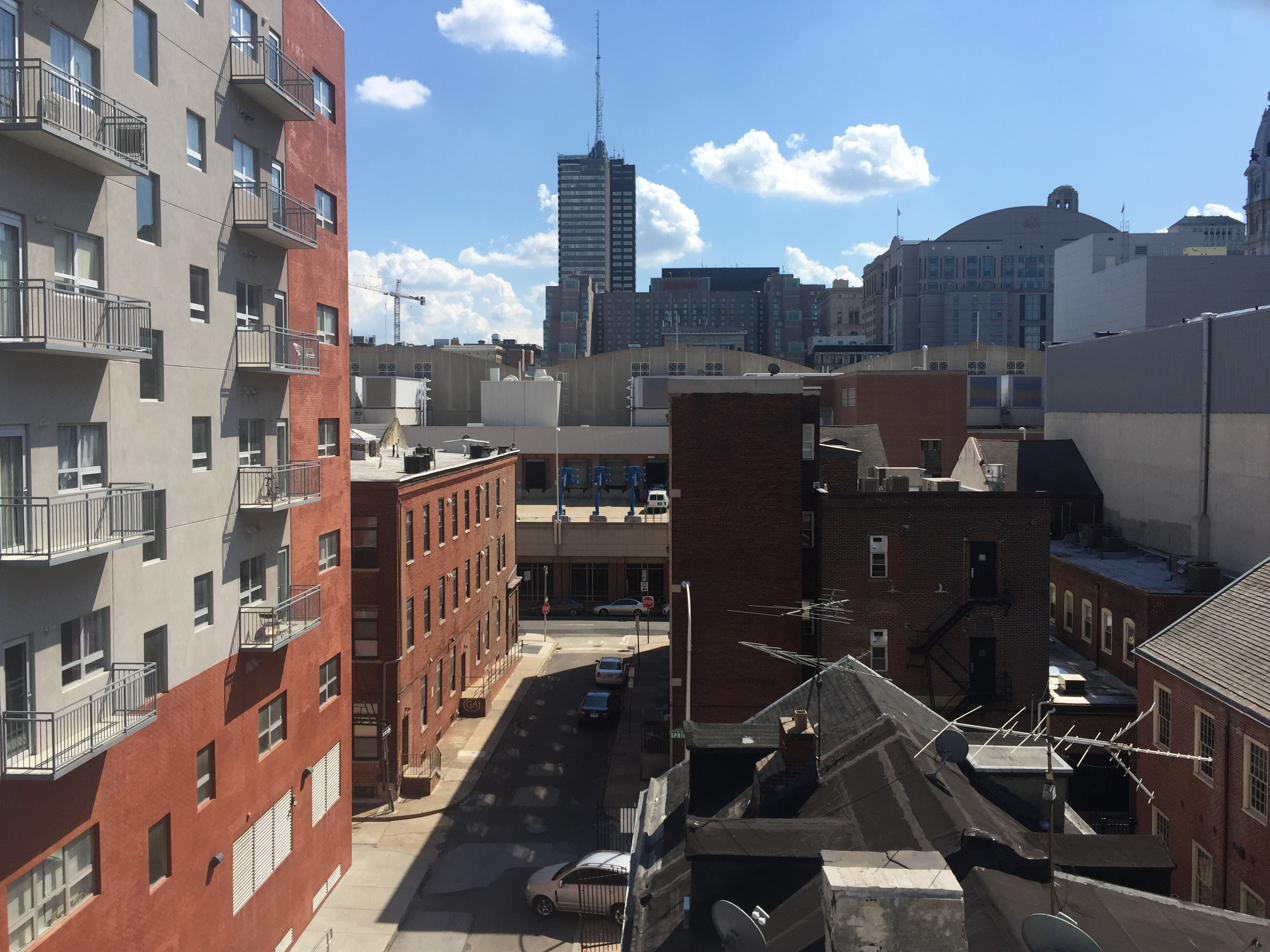
The back side of the convention center as viewed from Camac Street

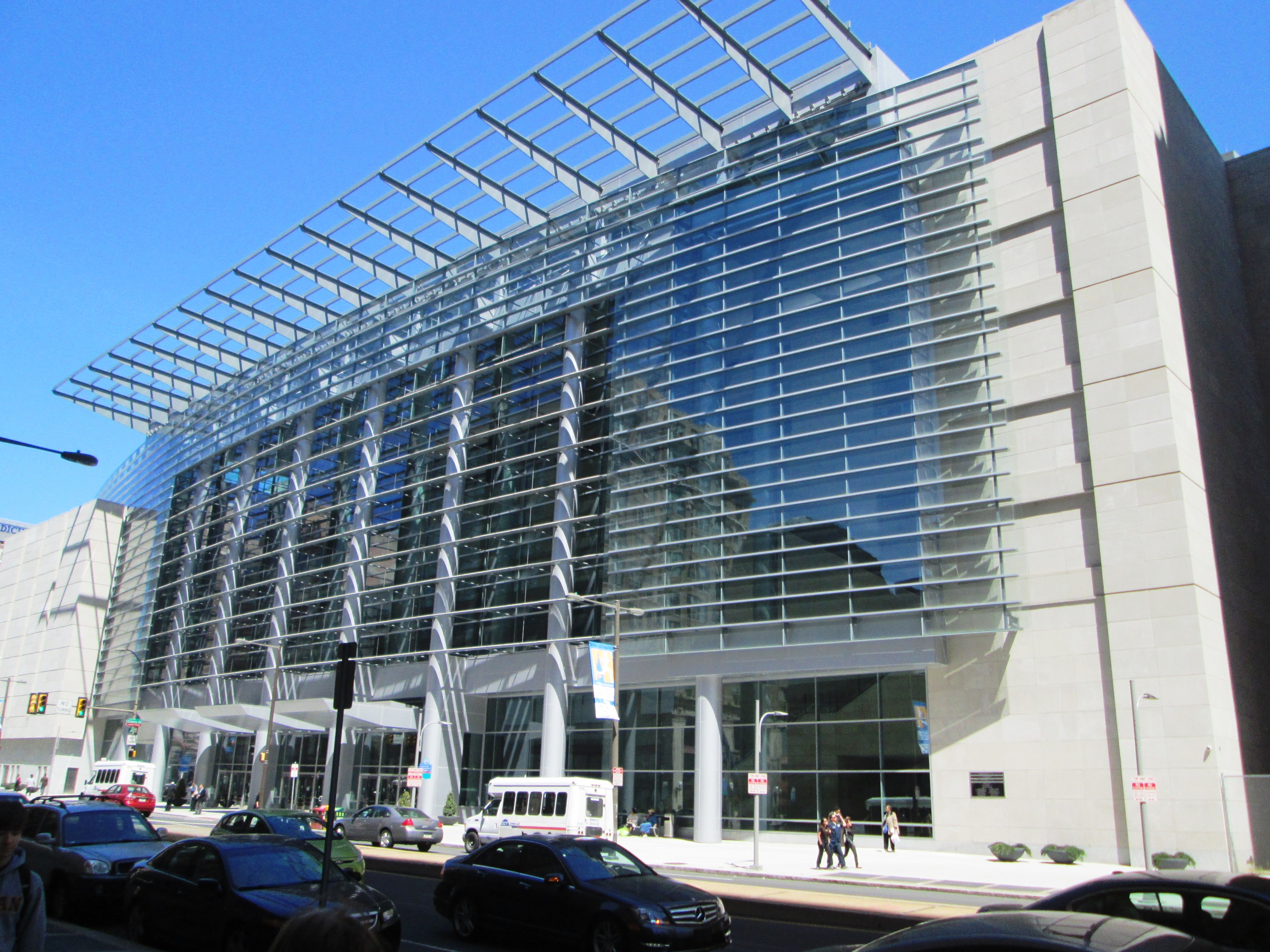
The new Broad Street façade of the Convention Center

In the latter part of the 20th century, the Philadelphia Convention Hall and Civic Center became outmoded. With the opening of the Spectrum in South Philadelphia, fewer big sporting and entertainment events used the Civic Center. Political conventions, too, outgrew the capacity of the Civic Center to host them. By the 1980s, regional and state leaders had begun to plan for a new convention center in the heart of Center City. It was decided that the former train shed of the Reading Terminal be the site of the new center and after renovations were finished by Wilson Brothers & Company, it opened in 1993. When it did, most of the events held in the Civic Center, including trade shows and the annual Philadelphia Flower Show, moved to the new facility.

As a result of the construction of the Pennsylvania Convention Center, the Chinatown buildings located on Arch Street, up to the intersection of 13th Street, were demolished.

== Description ==
The Pennsylvania Convention Center comprises four main halls or rooms, smaller meeting rooms and auditoriums, and the Grand Hall, which occupies much of the trainshed of the former Reading Railroad terminal. The rest of the train shed is occupied by meeting rooms and a hallway on the main floor, and the Grand Ballroom on the upper floor. The headhouse entrance to the Convention Center is located at 12th and Market streets in Center City. The A, B, and C exhibit halls extend across 12th Street, one story up (the 200 level) from the street level (100 level), between 11th and 13th streets and Arch and Race streets. At the south side of the A exhibit hall, a walkway extend over Arch Street, south into the grand hall. The opposite end of the grand hall provides a gated entrance into the headhouse lobby for the Marriott Hotel that occupies the old office spaces of Reading Railroad. Access to an adjoining Marriott Hotel is gained from this lobby by means of another second-story walkway over 12th Street.

The hotel, designed by BLT Architects with completion in 1995, is connected to the Market East Station via a skybridge to the historic Reading Terminal. The 1,200-room hotel also offers restaurants, a health/fitness center, and various-sized ballrooms and pre-function areas for meetings, convention activities, and other public and private events.

In 1999, designs by BLT Architects to expand the Marriott Hotel at the Pennsylvania Convention Center were completed. The upper seven floors of the historic Reading Terminal Headhouse, designed by the Wilson Brothers in 1894, provided space to expand the Marriott's conference capabilities with a 210 unit suites-type hotel featuring terraced restaurants and other public spaces. The grand ballroom occupies the Reading Railroad Company’s original waiting room.

== Reading Terminal ==
Reading Terminal consists of three parts. The headhouse, a nine-story office building fronting on Market Street, that contained the passenger station and the Reading Railroad company headquarters. It was designed in 1891 by New York architect Francis H. Kimball. The trainshed, directly north of the headhouse, was designed by the Philadelphia architecture/engineering firm of Wilson Brothers & Company. The tracks were raised on a viaduct and entered the great arched shed about 20 feet (6.1 m) above street level. Its single-span arched roof structure is touted as the world's oldest surviving. Reading Terminal Market, which had prior rights to the railroad's right-of-way for the property use, was built below the trainshed. The terminal opened in 1893 and served to enhance the railroad company's power and prominence, and contributed to the city's importance.

When Reading Company ceased to exist as a railroad owner and operator, it sold the headhouse and train shed to SEPTA, the regional transit service. SEPTA operated its Regional Rail commuter lines out of the shed until 1984, when they developed Market East Station (now Jefferson Station), an underground station that bypassed Reading Terminal by running under it, and the facility fell into disuse (except for the Reading Terminal Market).

City and state officials pondered on a means to reuse the facility, and formed a convention center authority. Public reaction to redevelopment prompted the new authority to preserve the market and the train shed in its design of the new convention center. It currently oversees the operation and maintenance of the convention center.

== Events ==
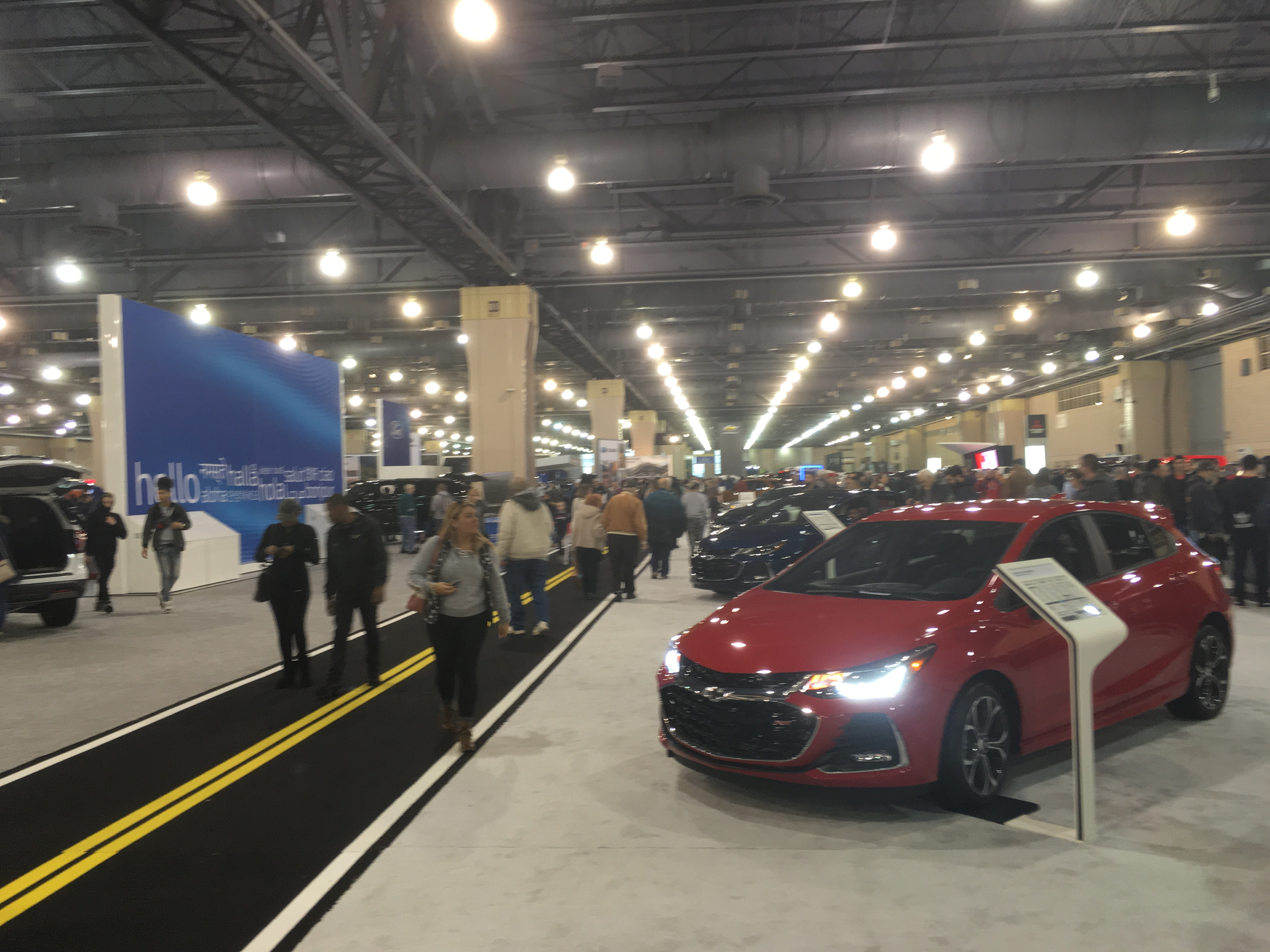
2019 Philadelphia Auto Show at Pennsylvania Convention Center

The Pennsylvania Convention Center annually hosts the Fancy Brigade Finale on January 1, Philadelphia Auto Show in early February and the Philadelphia Flower Show in early March, as well as numerous nonrecurring conferences and conventions.

Mail-in absentee ballots for the 2020 United States presidential election in Pennsylvania were counted at this center.

On March 3, 2021, during the COVID-19 pandemic, the Federal Emergency Management Agency opened a mass COVID-19 vaccination site at the Pennsylvania Convention Center. The site is able to provide shots to about 47,000 people a week. The mass COVID-19 vaccination site at the Pennsylvania Convention Center operated for at least eight weeks.

On June 4, 2023, as part of FanExpo Philadelphia, the Convention Center hosted a Back to the Future reunion panel with Michael J. Fox, Christopher Lloyd and Tom Wilson.

== Expansion ==
In December 2006, the Convention Center approved a $700 million plan to expand the Convention Center west to Broad Street, bringing the amount of convention space to approximately one million square feet. The expansion was completed in March 2011.

Expansion Statistics
| | Previous | Expansion | New Total |
|---|---|---|---|
| Number of Halls | 4 | 3 | 7 |
| Number of Meeting Rooms | 50 | 23 | 73 |
| Number of Truck Berths | 28 | 17 | 45 |
| Main Level Exhibit Hall Space | 315,000 sq. ft. (29300 m^{2}) | 213,000 sq. ft. (19800 m^{2}) | 528,000 sq. ft. (49100 m^{2}) |
| Street Level Exhibit Hall Space | 125,000 sq. ft. (11600 m^{2}) | 26,000 sq. ft. (2420 m^{2}) | 151,000 sq. ft. (14000 m^{2}) |
| Ballroom Space | 32,000 sq. ft. (2970 m^{2}) | 55,400 sq. ft. (5150 m^{2}) | 87,000 sq. ft. (8080 m^{2}) |
| Meeting/Banquet Space | 123,000 sq. ft. (11400 m^{2}) | 123,000 sq. ft. (11400 m^{2}) | 246,000 sq. ft. (22900 m^{2}) |
| Total Saleable Space | 624,000 sq. ft. (58000 m^{2}) | 376,000 sq. ft. (34900 m^{2}) | 1,000,000 sq. ft. (92900 m^{2}) |

== See also ==
- Market East, Philadelphia
