= High injury network =

Street network based safety analysis

A high injury network (sometimes shortened to HIN) is a way of identifying parts of an urban street network with higher rates of traffic injuries or fatalities, typically with a goal of prioritizing these streets for safety interventions. High injury networks have been published by many cities in the US and Canada as part of their efforts to work toward Vision Zero. While data on fatalities and collisions have long been available in many municipalities, the first HIN per se was published by San Francisco in 2013, though work on similar efforts had begun there as early as 2011.

Creating a HIN is a data-driven exercise, and the analytic methods and data sources used may vary widely. Most HINs are created at the scale of cities where detailed collision data is collected, though regional efforts at defining a more standardized approach also exist.
