= Cherry Street Tavern =

Restaurant in Philadelphia, Pennsylvania, U.S.

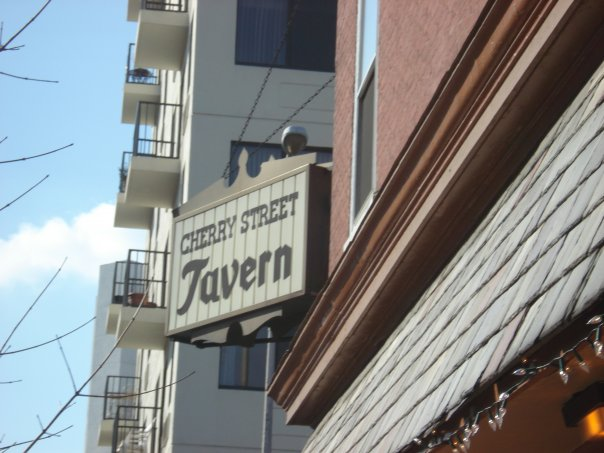

Restaurant information
- Established: 1905
- Location: 22nd and Cherry Streets, Philadelphia, Pennsylvania, U.S., Philadelphia, Pennsylvania, U.S.
- Coordinates: 39.957°N 75.17583°W

Cherry Street Tavern is a bar and restaurant at 22nd and Cherry Streets in the Logan Square neighborhood of Philadelphia. It is notable as a local landmark that has operated in the same location since the early 1900s. The bar was bought by local high school football legend John "Tex" Flannery (1922-2007) in 1972.

Flannery was football coach at John Bartram High School from 1944 through 1947 and at La Salle College High School from 1953 until 1984. Flannery sold the bar to brothers Bill and Bob Loughery in 1990. Bill had started working for Tex full-time at the tavern in 1976.

== History ==
The tavern was first licensed as a bar in 1905. During Prohibition, the bar itself was removed from the building and replaced with a barber's chair, and the tavern was transformed into a barber shop, although men went there for more than a haircut. At the time, women had to enter the tavern through the "ladies' entrance," a rear door leading into a back room, as only men were allowed into the bar room.

On May 1, 1940, The Philadelphia Inquirer called the bar "John J. Devers' taproom at 22d and Cherry sts", describing the late-night attempted theft and ultimate destruction of "25 quart bottles of bottled-in-bond liquor".

Before it was the Cherry Street Tavern, the establishment was Dever's Bar. In February, 1971, the bartender of Dever's was arrested for selling New Jersey Lottery tickets at face value at the bar. This arrest pre-dated the launch of the official Pennsylvania Lottery less than six months later.

In a 1981 profile of Tex Flannery entitled "No School's like Old School", the Philadelphia Daily News described the Cherry Street Tavern as "cave-dark, cave-cool, cave-quiet", and said that it had no jukebox.

A disused urinal trough runs along the base of the bar. At one time, patrons could drink, eat, and urinate at the same time.

== In popular culture ==
- In the 2002 film Bitters and Blue Ruin, the Cherry Street Tavern served both as one of the sites for the filmmakers' weekly writing meetings and also as a shooting location.

== See also ==
- McGillin's Olde Ale House
