= Chinatown, Philadelphia =

Neighborhood of Philadelphia, Pennsylvania

Chinatown
- Neighborhood of Philadelphia
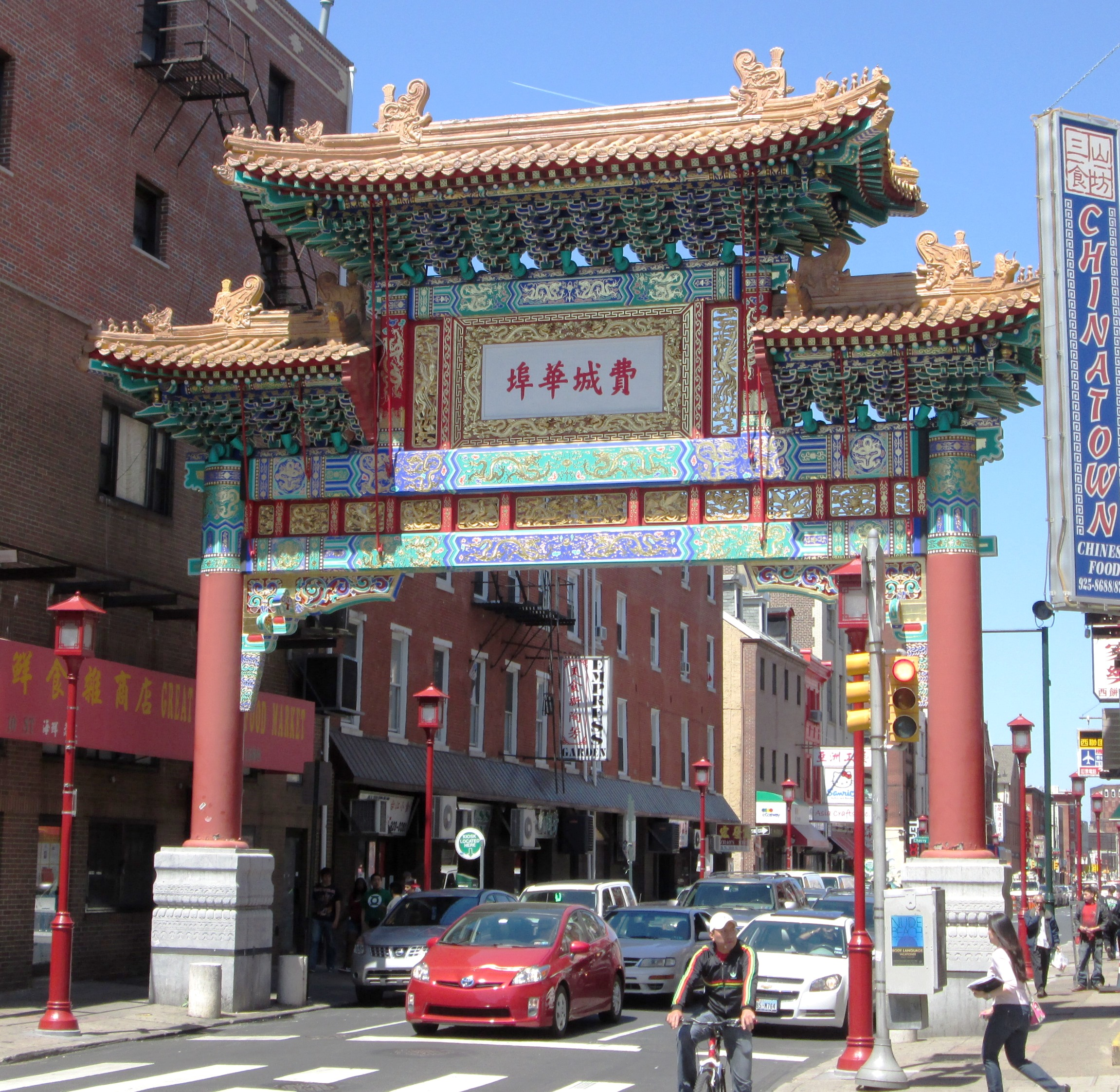
- A Chinese "Friendship Arch" at 10th and Arch streets in Philadelphia

- Location within Philadelphia
- Coordinates: 39°57′13″N 75°09′23″W
- Country: United States
- State: Pennsylvania
- County: Philadelphia
- City: Philadelphia
- ZIP Code: 19107
- Area codes: 215, 267, and 445

Philadelphia Chinatown is a predominantly Asian American neighborhood in Center City, Philadelphia, Pennsylvania. The Philadelphia Chinatown Development Corporation supports the area. The neighborhood stretches from Vine Street on the north, Arch Street on the south, North Franklin Street and N. 7th Street on the east, to North Broad Street on the west.

Unlike some traditional Chinatowns, the Philadelphia Chinatown continues to grow in size and ethnic Chinese population, as Philadelphia itself was, as of 2018, experiencing significant Chinese immigration from New York City, 95 miles (153 km) to the north, and (as of 2019) from China, the second top country of birth by a significant margin sending immigrants to Philadelphia. Since the 1980s Chinatown has become increasingly pan-Asian and includes Vietnamese, Cambodian, Japanese, Korean, Malaysian and Indonesian immigrants and businesses.

== History ==
=== 19th century ===
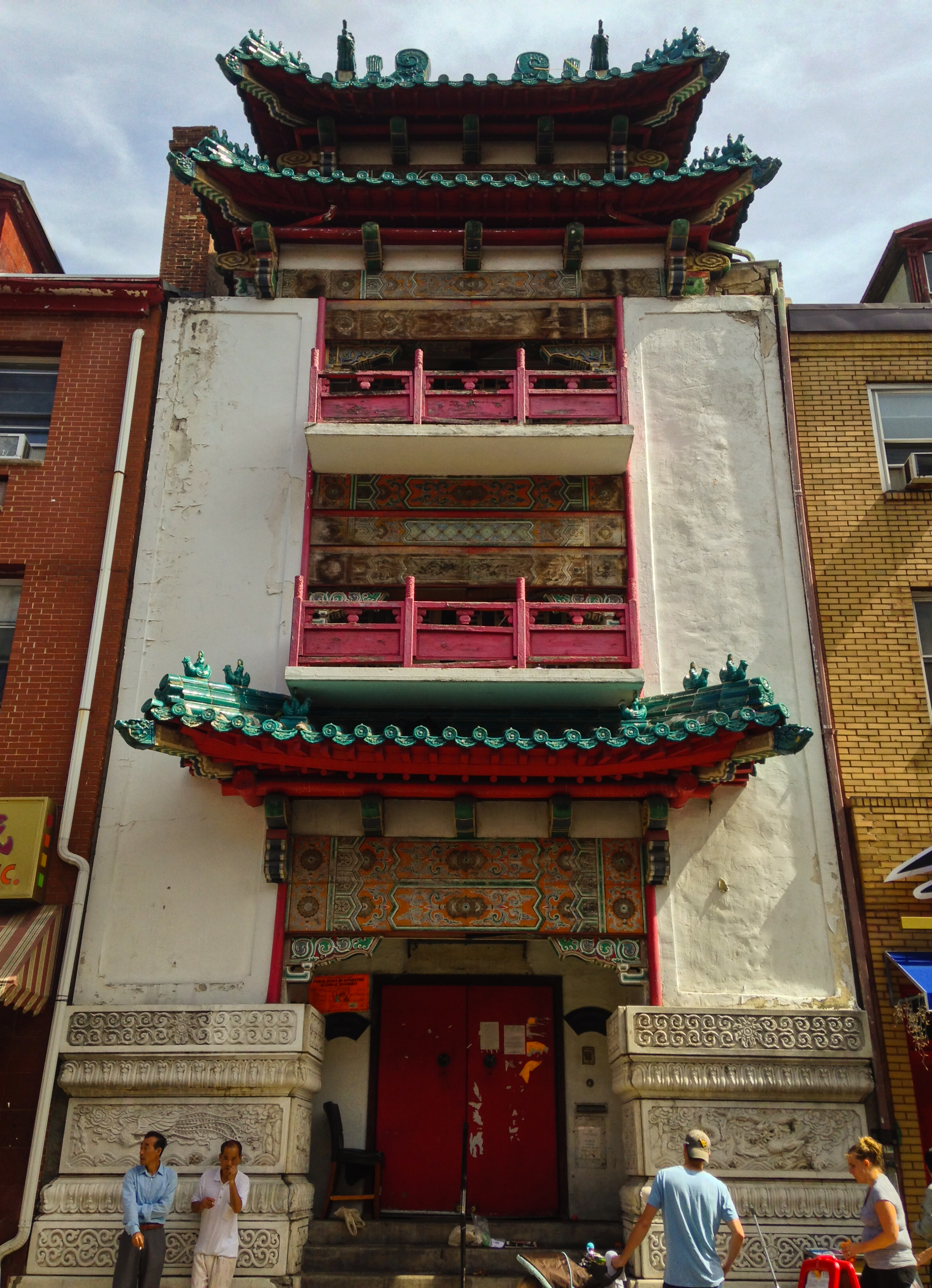
Chinese Cultural and Community Center in Philadelphia's Chinatown

Philadelphia's Chinatown has its roots in the displacement of Chinese Americans from the American West following the completion of the first transcontinental railroad in 1869. Violence and intimidation against Chinese laborers intensified due to the over-saturated labor market and drove many to eastern cities, including Philadelphia.The first Chinese immigrants to Philadelphia were largely young men who had left their families in China in search of work. In Chinatown, they were able to form communities and find social support with extended kin and through cultural associations. Passage of the Chinese Exclusion Act in 1882 further isolated Chinese laborers from their families, who could no longer join them in America, and denied them the ability to obtain naturalized citizenship, preventing their assimilation.

In postbellum Philadelphia, which was renowned for its manufacturing industries, Chinese men were excluded from the industrial workforce and opened laundries and restaurants in an area near Philadelphia's commercial wharves. This led to the start of Philadelphia's Chinatown. The first business was a laundry owned by Lee Fong at 913 Race Street; it opened in 1871.

=== 20th century ===
In the following years, Chinatown consisted of ethnic Chinese businesses clustered around the 900 block of Race Street.

Prior to the mid-1960s, it consisted of several restaurants and one grocery store.

In the mid-1960s, large numbers of families began moving to Chinatown. During various periods of urban renewal, starting in the 1960s, portions of Chinatown were razed for the construction of the Vine Street Expressway and the Pennsylvania Convention Center. The Philadelphia Chinatown Development Corporation was formed in 1968. This gave community and business leaders more say in matters of local development.

In the late 1990s, the Philadelphia Phillies baseball team was hoping to build a new ballpark in downtown Philadelphia to replace the aging Veterans Stadium in South Philadelphia. Several locations were considered, including 12th and Vine Streets, just north of the Vine Street Expressway. The Philadelphia Chinatown Development Corporation mounted an intense opposition to the ballpark plans. Residents were concerned that the ballpark would destroy Chinatown. The PCDC staged protests and rallies that united neighborhood groups, religious, labor, ethnic, and political groups. Eventually the Phillies built Citizens Bank Park at the South Philadelphia Sports Complex, which opened in 2004. In years leading up to 1998, businesses catering to other immigrants from East and Southeast Asian countries, like South Korea, Thailand, and Vietnam, opened in Chinatown.

By 1998, community leaders had taken a property bounded by 8th Street, 9th Street, Callowhill, and Vine in order to establish a US$7 million townhome complex called Hing Wah Yuen.

=== 21st century ===
In 2012, a plan to build the Eastern Tower Community Center (renamed "Crane Chinatown" since Nov 2018) was approved by the city council. Construction of this prominent community center began in August 2017. The official opening and dedication ceremony was held on November 8, 2019. On December 19th 2024 the Philadelphia City council voted to approve a stadium to be built a block away from Chinatown, but the NBA Philadelphia 76ers decided to not build there. The team decided remain in the city's sports stadium district instead.

== Cityscape ==
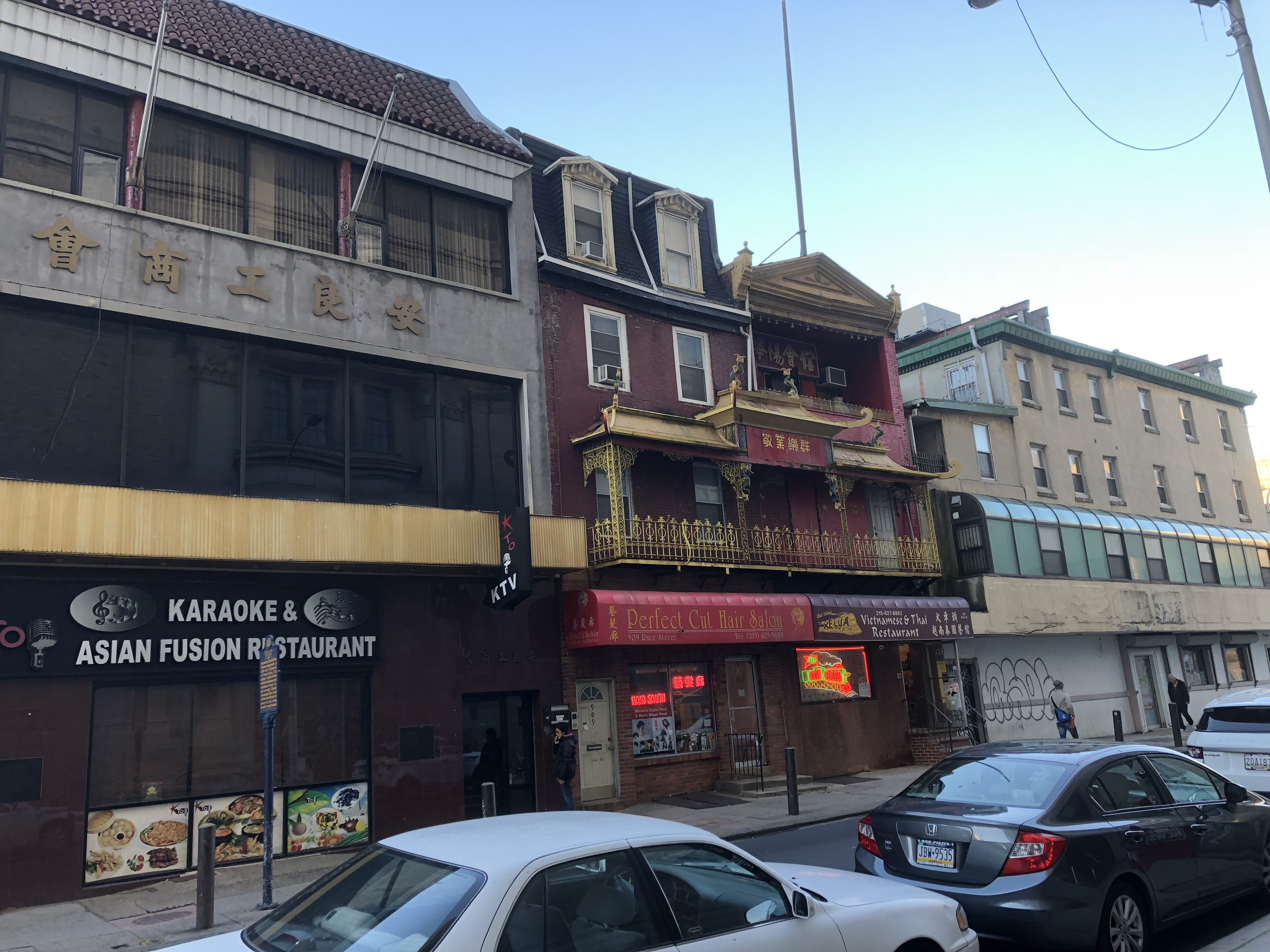
Location of Chinatown's birthplace

Vine Street is the northern boundary of Chinatown. Restaurants and shops, with apartment units located above, are in the buildings south of Vine Street, within Chinatown. Factories and other industrial properties are located on the other side of Vine Street. Filbert Street serves as the southern border. Chinatown includes a core area that has seven city blocks. Many of the residents of the block were, as of 1998, recent immigrants.

Developments in the 20th century formed the current boundaries of the Philadelphia Chinatown. In the 1920s, ramps leading to the Benjamin Franklin Bridge were constructed at Chinatown's northern edge. At another point, the city condemned an area east of what is now Chinatown so that the new headquarters of the Philadelphia Police Department, Independence Mall, and the Metropolitan Hospital could be constructed. In 2004, the former Metropolitan Hospital was converted into a luxury condo complex.

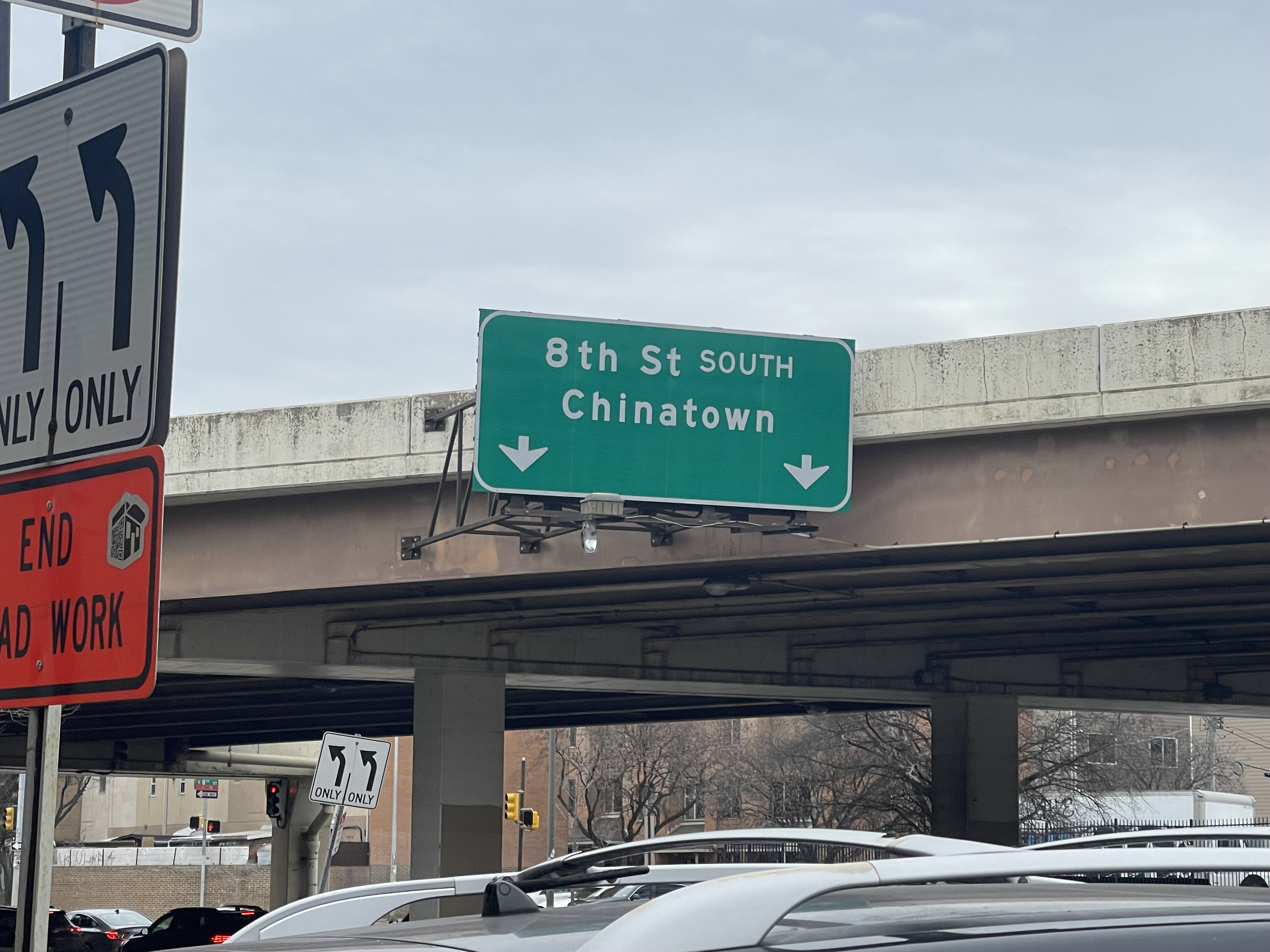
8th Street/Chinatown sign close to the Vine Street Expressway

At one point, the city proposed building an eight lane highway that would divide the Philadelphia Chinatown into two parts and eliminate the Holy Redeemer Church and School. The church and school remained, while the Vine Street Expressway, smaller than its original proposed size, was built. Cecelia Yep, one of the founders of the Philadelphia Chinatown Development Coalition, said "I think we saw it as a plan to get rid of Chinatown. [The church and school] was the only thing good in Chinatown at the time. We thought it was a fight for survival."

The construction of the Market East Station in the 1970s and 1980s established Filbert Street as Chinatown's southern border. As a result of the construction of the Pennsylvania Convention Center, which opened in 1993, the Chinatown buildings on Arch Street, up to the intersection of 13th Street, were demolished. In addition, a federal prison, the Federal Detention Center, Philadelphia, opened in the area. AsianWeek said "Each was built with much compromising, and now they form a circle around Chinatown’s current core of about five city blocks."

== Demographics ==
Historical population
Census	Pop.	Note	%±
1990	1,096		—
2000	1,421		29.7%
2010	2,464		73.4%
Asian American population

As of the 2000 U.S. census, the service area of the Philadelphia Chinatown Development Corporation had 1,362 residents in 459 households. Of the residents, 1,085 were Asian American, 152 were White American, 71 were African American, 31 were of other races, and 23 were Hispanic American. During that year the community had 509 housing units, with 50 of them being vacant and 85 of them being owner occupied.

As of 1998 the wider Chinatown area had about 4,000 residents. Many of them worked in clothing assembly companies, restaurants, and related suppliers located in the area. As of that year, most residents were Chinese American. As of the 1990 U.S. census the median income of Chinatown was under $15,000. The median income of the 47,000 residents of Center City Philadelphia as a whole was $60,000. As of 2000, of the 4,000 residents of the wider area, about 70% have no English fluency.

The Philadelphia Chinatown Development Corporation said that the area also serves about 250,000 Chinese Americans residing in Delaware, New Jersey, and Pennsylvania. Fuzhounese and other Chinese Americans are immigrating from New York City in significant numbers.

== Landmarks ==
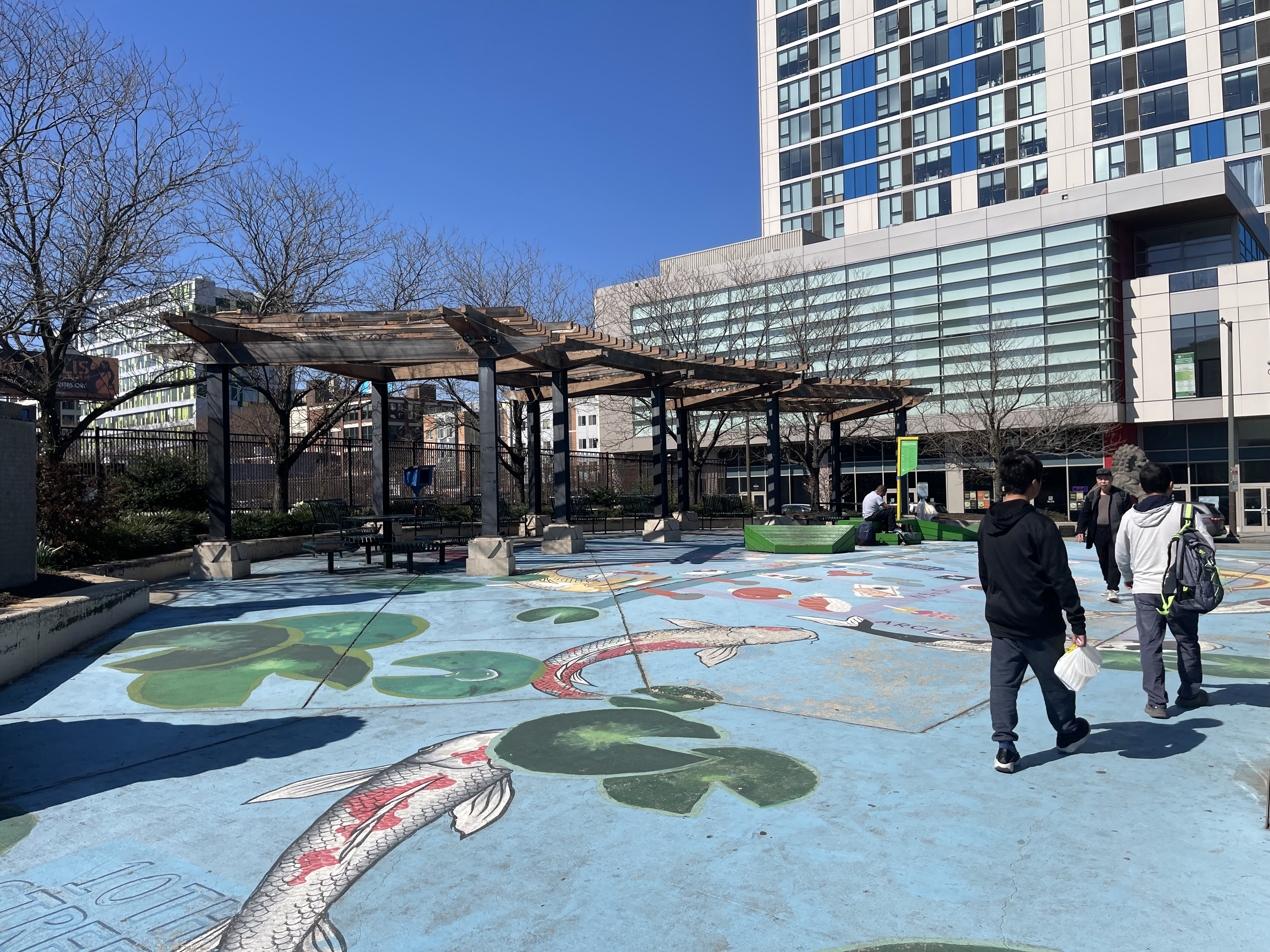
Vine Street decorations with lion statues

The Chinatown Friendship Gate at 10th and Arch Street is a symbol of cultural exchange and friendship between Philadelphia and its Chinese sister city of Tianjin. Launched by the Port Agreement signed in Tianjin, China, on November 11, 1982, the Gate was commissioned by the Department of Commerce and the Department of Public Property. It was completed in the winter of 1983-84 and dedicated on January 31, 1984.

The Gate is the first authentic Chinese Gate built in America by artisans from China. Weighing about 88 tons and standing 40 feet high, the Gate has bright colors and elaborate designs that reflect early Chinese imperial construction. It has themes of mythical creatures and graphic patterns typical of the Ming and Qing Dynasties. A procession of mythical animals is featured on tiles. The phoenix is meant to ensure good luck. The dragon, said to have the magical power of retaining water in its mouth, is intended to protect the structure of the Gate and the community from fire. The four traditional Chinese characters on both sides of the Gate are, "費城華埠" (Fèichéng huá bù), which means Philadelphia Chinatown.

The Gate was repainted in 2008 with the help of Tianjin artisans using ancient techniques and traditional materials and funded by the City of Philadelphia and the help of Philadelphia Chinatown Development Corporation. The Gate was rededicated on November 19, 2008.

== Culinary attractions ==
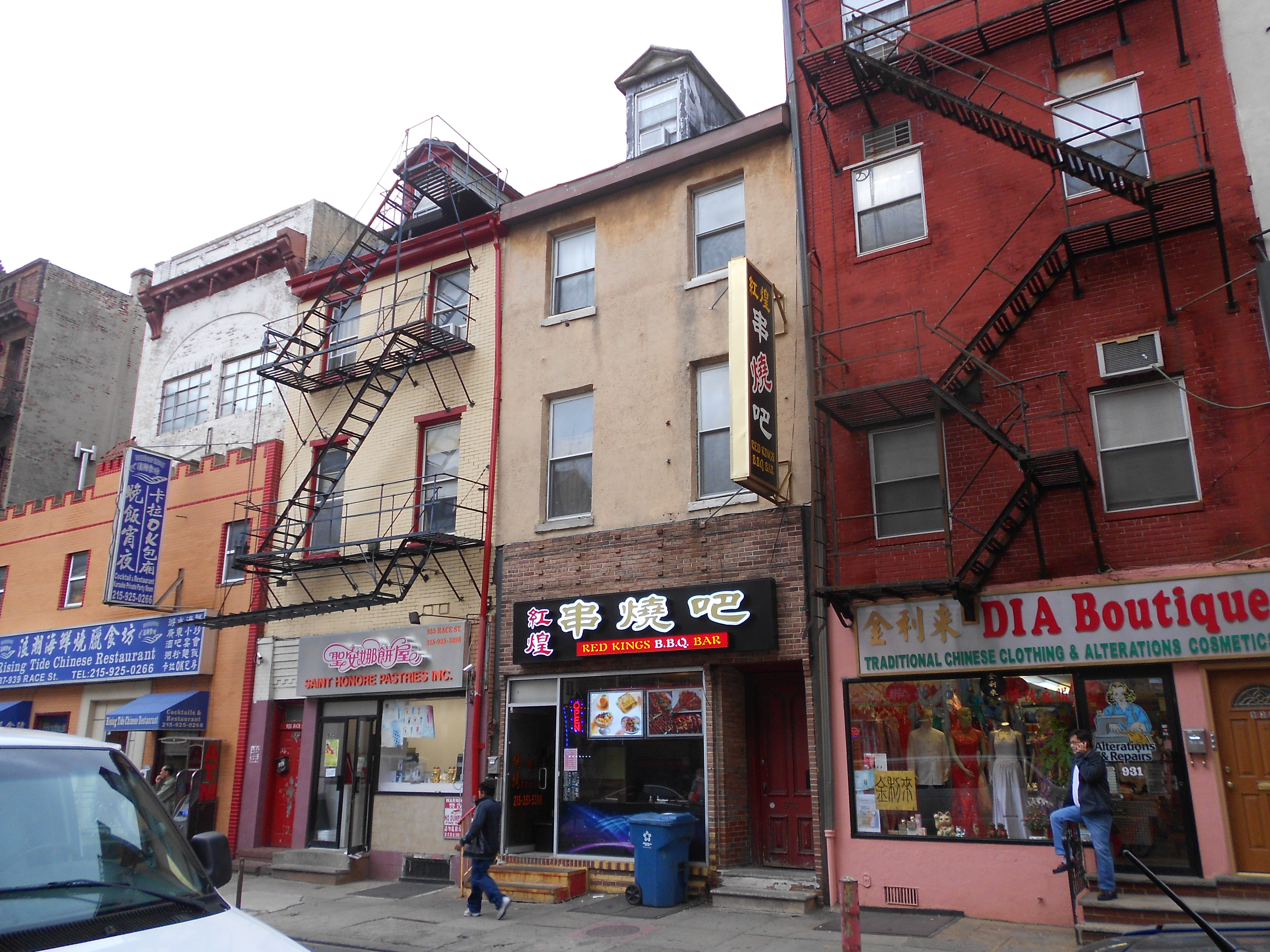
933-935 Race Street in Philadelphia's Chinatown; both buildings have been named to the Philadelphia Register of Historic Places.

Chinatown features a large number of restaurants featuring East Asian cuisines. 10th Street and Race Street host nearly a dozen different Hong Kong-style bakery cafes. Furthermore, there are restaurants serving Cantonese, Fujianese, Northern, Sichuan, and Taiwanese cuisine. Numerous restaurants in Philadelphia's Chinatown feature other Asian cuisines, such as Burmese, Japanese, Korean, and Vietnamese.

== Transportation ==
The Chinatown station on SEPTA's Broad-Ridge Spur is located at 8th and Vine streets, and Jefferson Station serving SEPTA Regional Rail is only a block from the Chinatown Friendship Gate. Jefferson Station is located in the neighborhood and SEPTA provides local bus transportation to the area. PATCO Speedline also provides service to Chinatown via its recently-reopened Franklin Square station.

== Education ==
=== Primary and secondary schools ===
==== Public schools ====
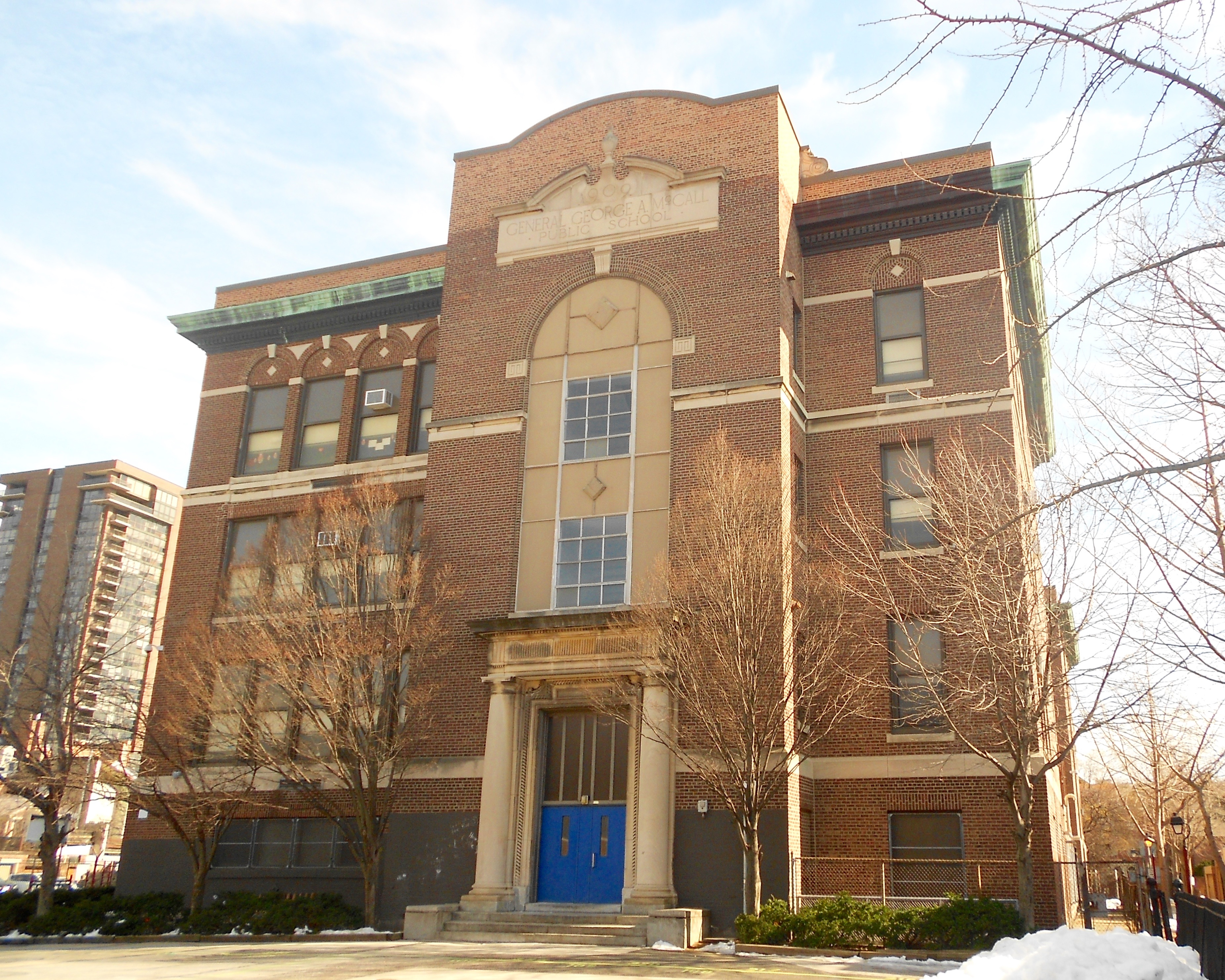
George A. McCall School in Society Hill

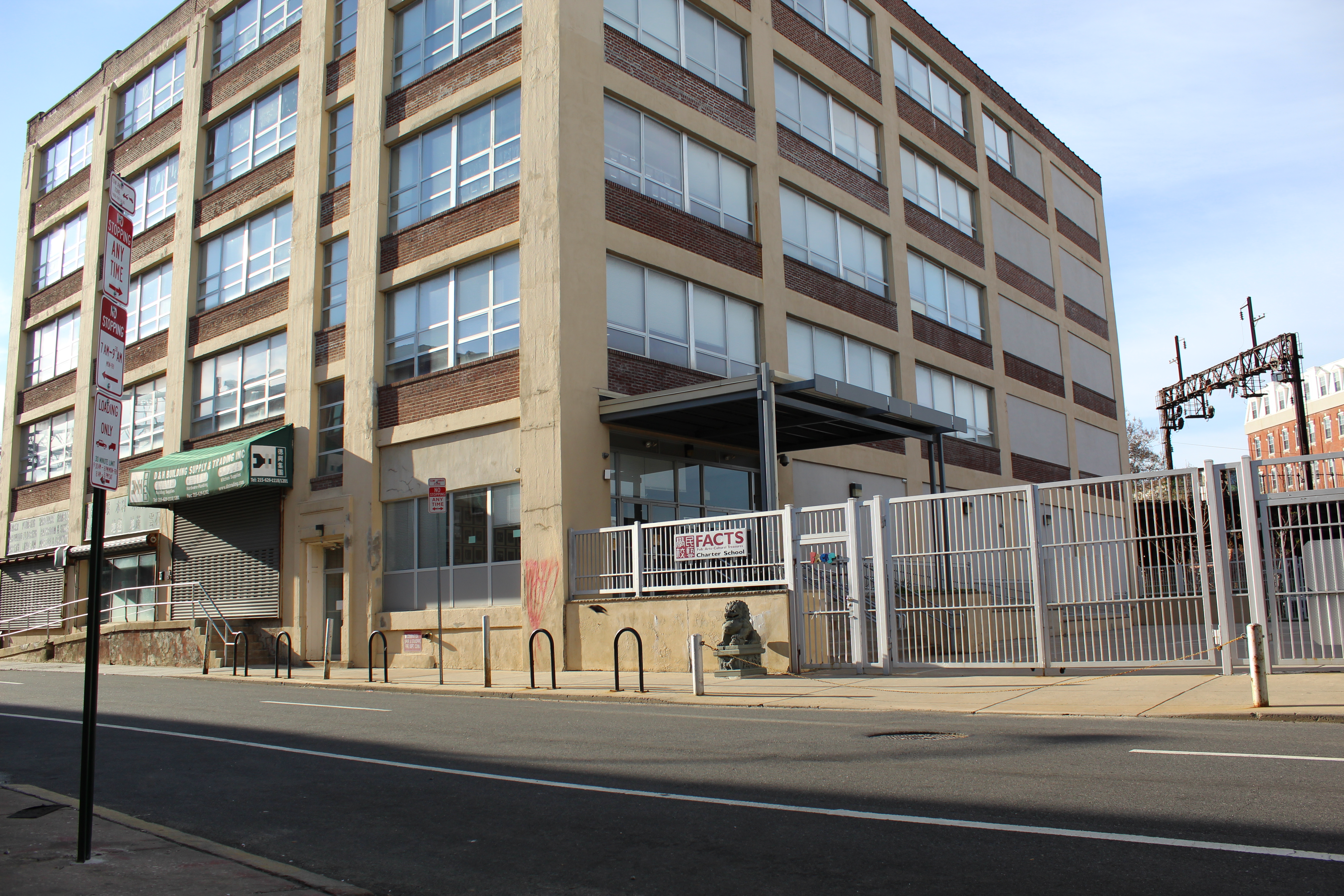
Folk Arts-Cultural Treasures Charter School

The School District of Philadelphia operates area public schools. Residents of much of the Chinatown area are zoned to General George A. McCall School, a K-8 school located in Society Hill, 1 mile (1.6 km) south of Chinatown. As of 2005 most Chinatown residents who are unable to afford tuition to send their children to private school send their children to McCall.

All persons assigned to McCall are assigned to Benjamin Franklin High School in North Philadelphia. Previously most area residents were zoned to Horace Furness High School in South Philadelphia.

Folk Arts-Cultural Treasures Charter School (FACTS, 民藝特許學校; 民艺特许学校; Mín Yì Tèxǔ Xuéxiào), a K-8 public charter school, is located in Chinatown.

In 1993, the school district began a school bus route between Chinatown and McCall. The school is 1.4 miles (2.3 km) away from the furthest point of Chinatown. The district was not required to install the route, but parents advocated for the route because they believed that traffic at Market Street and Washington Square endangered their children. When the district proposed cutting the route in 1994, parents complained.

In a two-year period until 1998, the number of Chinese students at McCall doubled. In 1998 Chinese students were 25% of McCall's 650 person student body. By September 1998 the school, which had 650 students, established a bilingual English-Chinese program to serve Chinese immigrant students, and that month it began hiring teachers fluent in both languages to teach core subjects.

As of 1998 there were no public schools within Chinatown itself. In 2005 the Philadelphia School Reform Commission approved the creation of the charter school FACTS in Chinatown. At the time the Chinatown Community Development Corporation opposed the creation of the charter school, saying that it was not necessary and that it would hurt enrollment figures at McCall and Holy Redeemer.

==== Private schools ====
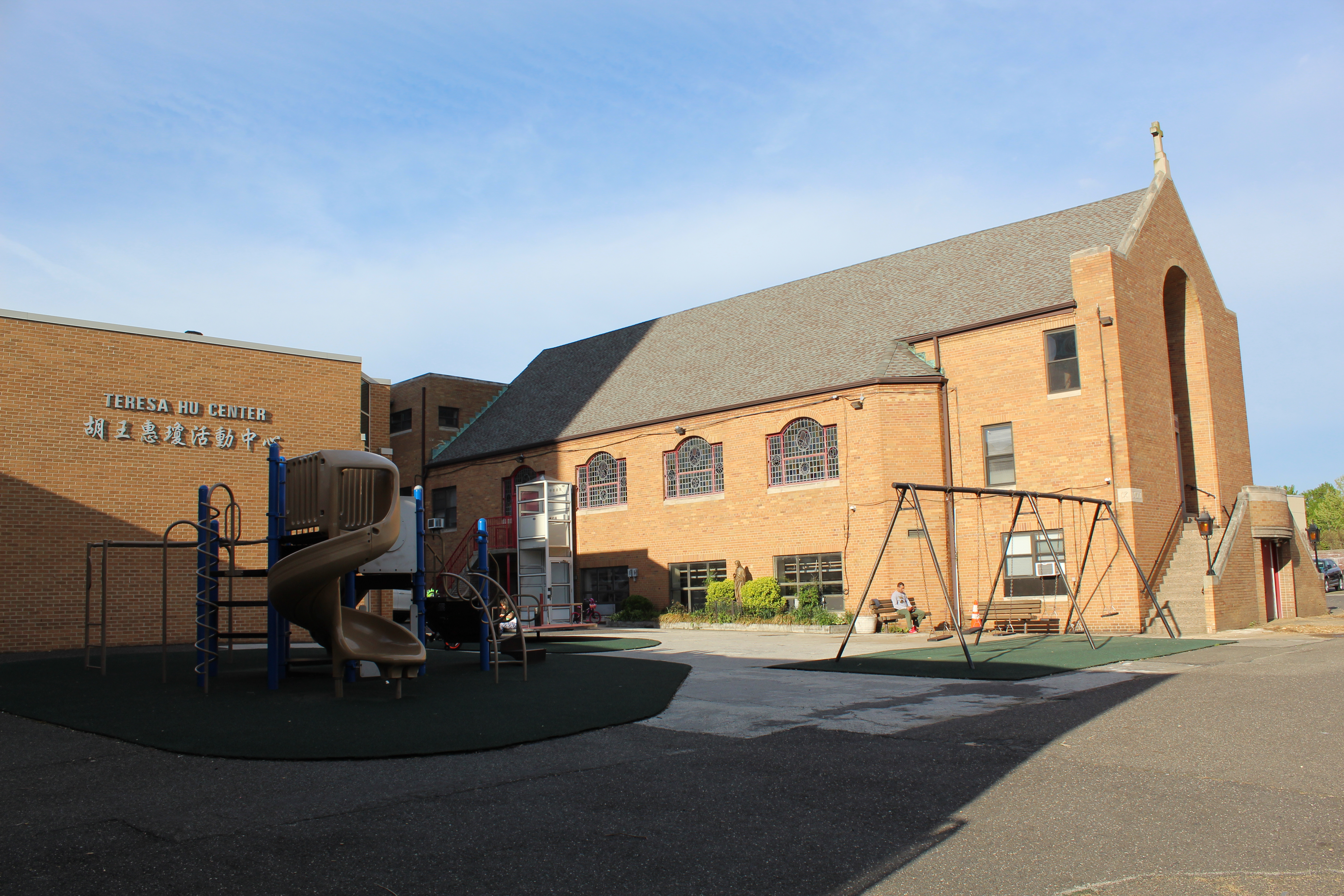
Holy Redeemer Chinese Catholic Church and School, built in 1941

The Roman Catholic Archdiocese of Philadelphia operates Catholic schools. The Holy Redeemer Chinese Catholic Church and School was constructed in 1941. David J. Wallace of The New York Times said that it was "a leading Chinatown institution." It was the first Chinese Catholic church in the Western Hemisphere. Historically many Chinatown residents enrolled their children in the school, and the community used the church and school complex as a meeting place and a community center. In the 1990s the school lost much of its schoolyard due to expansion of the Vine Street Expressway. In 2005 it was the only school in Chinatown.

=== Colleges and libraries ===
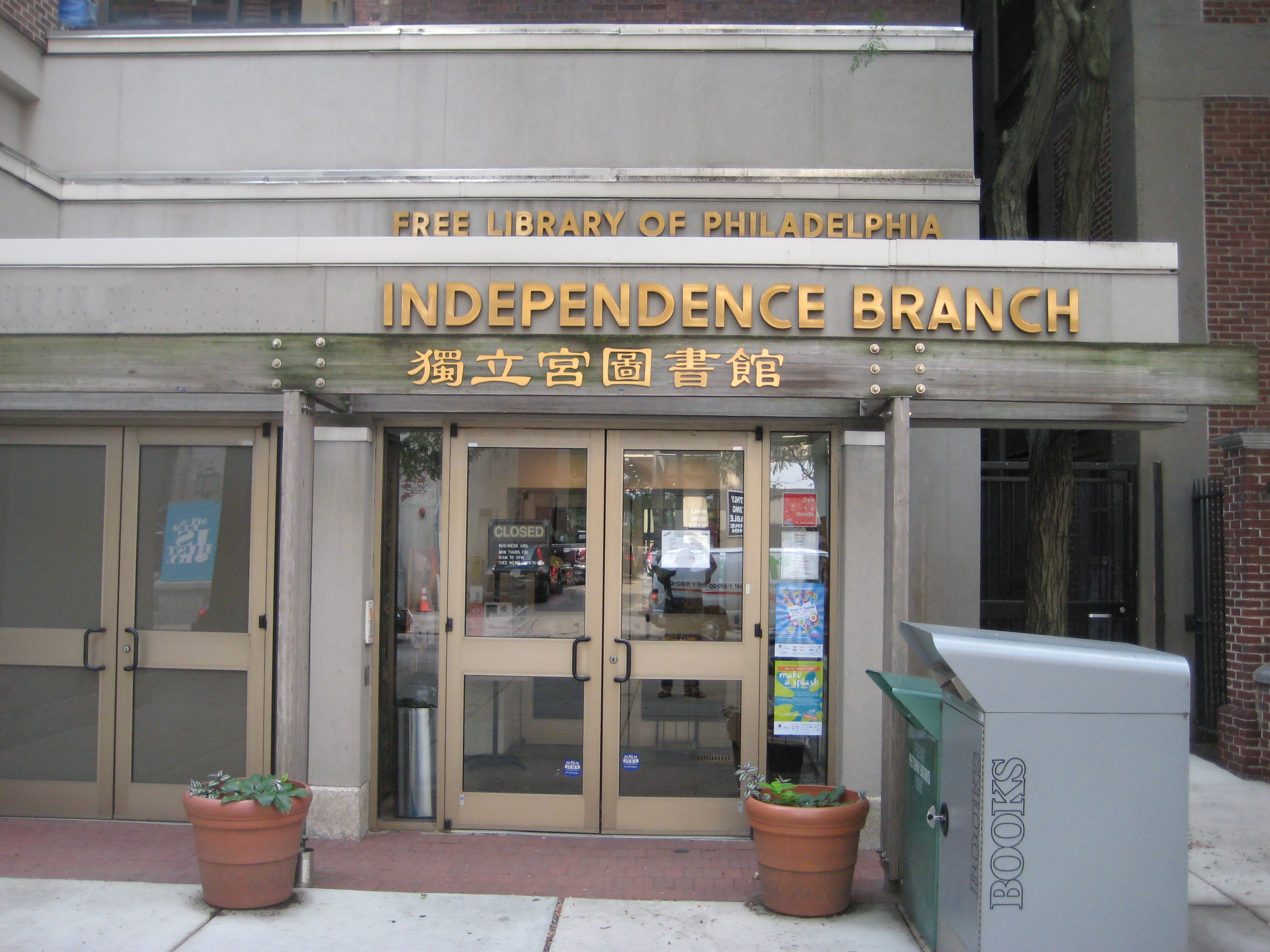
Independence Branch Library in Society Hill

The nearest branch of the Free Library of Philadelphia is the Independence Branch in Society Hill, about four blocks from Chinatown.

The Philadelphia Community College system serves Chinatown.
