= Major General George Gordon Meade =

Major General George Gordon Meade may refer to

- Equestrian statue of George Meade (Philadelphia)
- George Gordon Meade Memorial
