= Equestrian statue of George Meade =

Equestrian statue of George Meade may refer to

- Equestrian statue of George Meade (Philadelphia)
- Equestrian statue of Georgia Meade at Gettysburg National Military Park
