= Alexander Milne Calder =

Scottish-American sculptor (1846–1923)

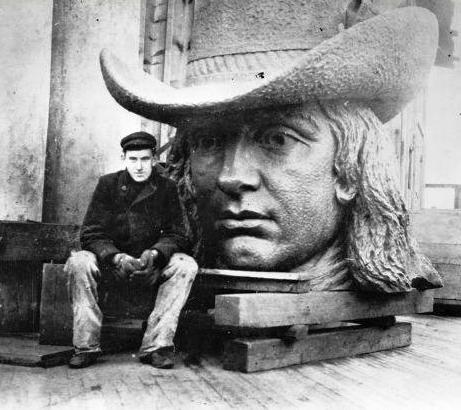
- Calder in 1894 with the head of William Penn statue that sits atop Philadelphia City Hall
- Born: August 23, 1846; Aberdeen, Scotland
- Died: June 4, 1923 (aged 76); Philadelphia, Pennsylvania, U.S.
- Resting place: West Laurel Hill Cemetery, Bala Cynwyd, Pennsylvania, U.S.
- Education: Pennsylvania Academy of Fine Arts
- Known for: Sculpture
- Spouse: Margaret Stirling

Alexander Milne Calder (August 23, 1846 – June 4, 1923) was a Scottish-American sculptor. He produced over 250 architectural sculptures over 30 years for the construction of Philadelphia City Hall including the 37-foot statue of William Penn atop the structure. Additional works include the Equestrian statue of George Meade in Fairmount Park in Philadelphia. His son, Alexander Stirling Calder, and grandson Alexander Calder were also sculptors.

== Early life and education ==
Calder was born on August 23, 1846, in Aberdeen, Scotland, and first learned to carve stone from his father, a tombstone carver. He attended the Royal Academy in Edinburgh and studied with sculptor John Rhind. He traveled to Paris and London where he studied at the South Kensington School and worked on the Albert Memorial. In 1868, he emigrated to the United States and settled in Philadelphia, where he studied with Thomas Eakins at the Pennsylvania Academy of Fine Arts.

== Career ==
In 1872, he was hired by architect John McArthur Jr., to produce models for the sculptures adorning Philadelphia City Hall. The commission required more than 250 marble and bronze pieces over the 30 year construction. That same year, Calder was commissioned by the forerunner of Philadelphia's current Association for Public Art, the Fairmount Park Art Association, to create an equestrian statue of Major General George Gordon Meade which was installed in 1887.

In 1875, he won the competition to create the bronze statue of William Penn for the new City Hall. In 1877, Calder used one of the offices in city hall as his studio and worked there through the construction period. The statue is 37 feet tall, and weighs over 53,000 pounds. Calder originally made a clay model nine-feet tall and kept enlarging it until it reached 37 feet tall. The sculpture sat unfinished for 2 years until the Tacony Iron and Metal Works opened in 1889 with the capacity to cast the statue. The statue was cast in 1892 and originally displayed in the courtyard of city hall for a year until it was installed in 14 separate pieces atop the tower. The statue was dedicated on November 18, 1894. The sculpture of Penn is the largest atop any building in the world. Calder was frustrated that the statue was installed facing northeast toward Penn Treaty Park rather than south as he wanted. This positioning results in the statue face being in shadow except in early morning light. Philadelphia City Hall also contains 250 relief and free-standing statues from Calder and his assistant James G. C. Hamilton.

Calder died on June 4, 1923, at his home in Philadelphia and was interred at West Laurel Hill Cemetery in Bala Cynwyd, Pennsylvania.

== Legacy ==
A historical plaque at Philadelphia City Hall highlights Calder's work on the building. His son, Alexander Stirling Calder, and grandson Alexander Calder were also sculptors. Works from Alexander Milne Calder will be displayed at a new museum under construction for his grandson's work in Philadelphia.

== Gallery ==
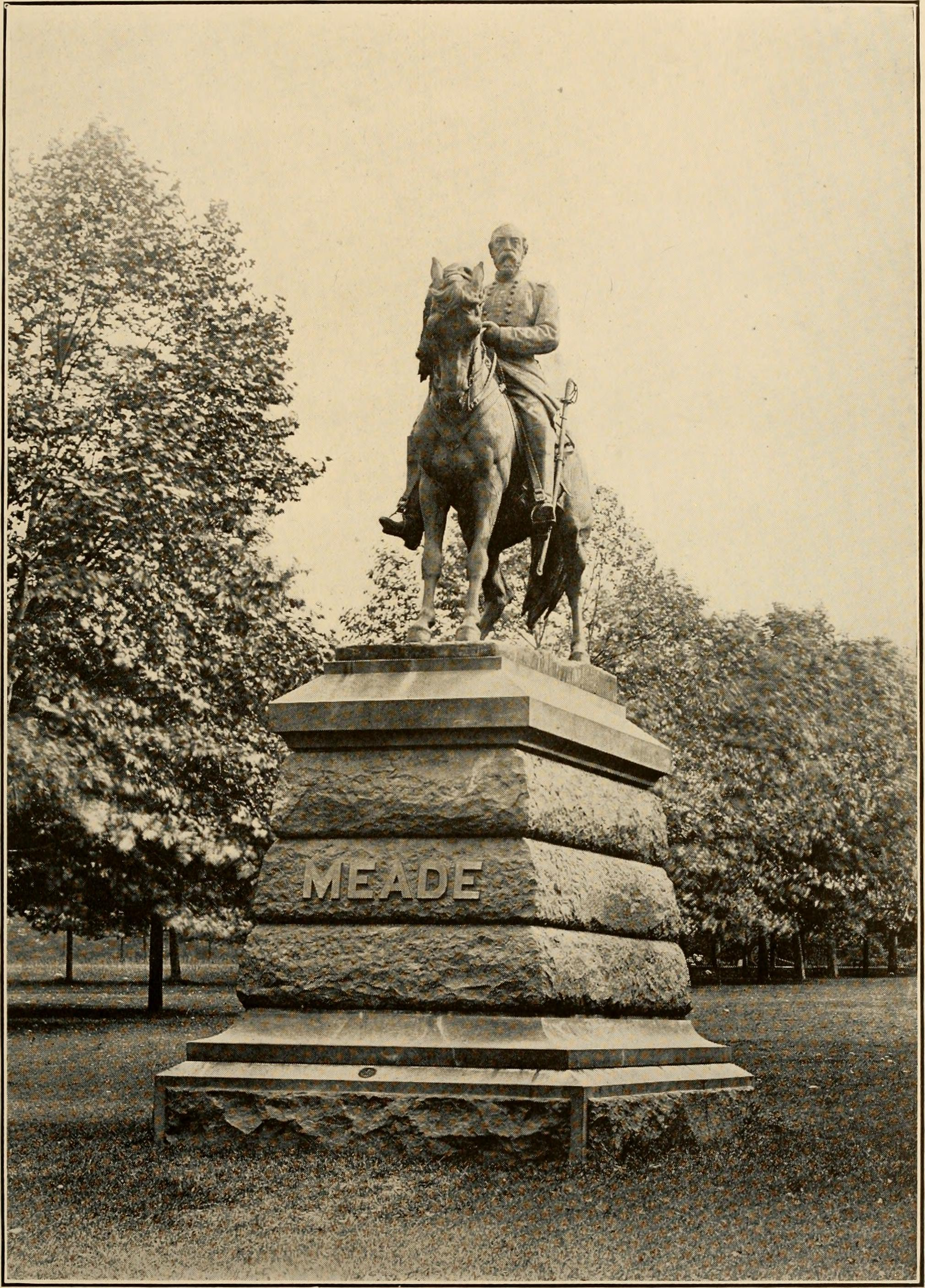
Equestrian statue of George Meade, Fairmount Park (1887)

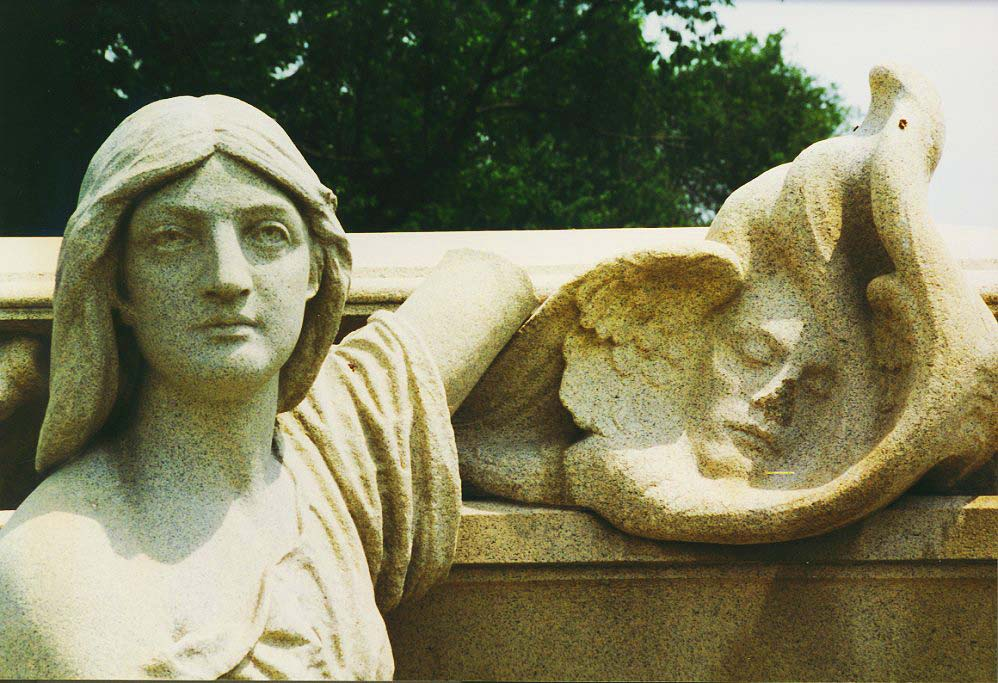
William Warner Tomb, Laurel Hill Cemetery

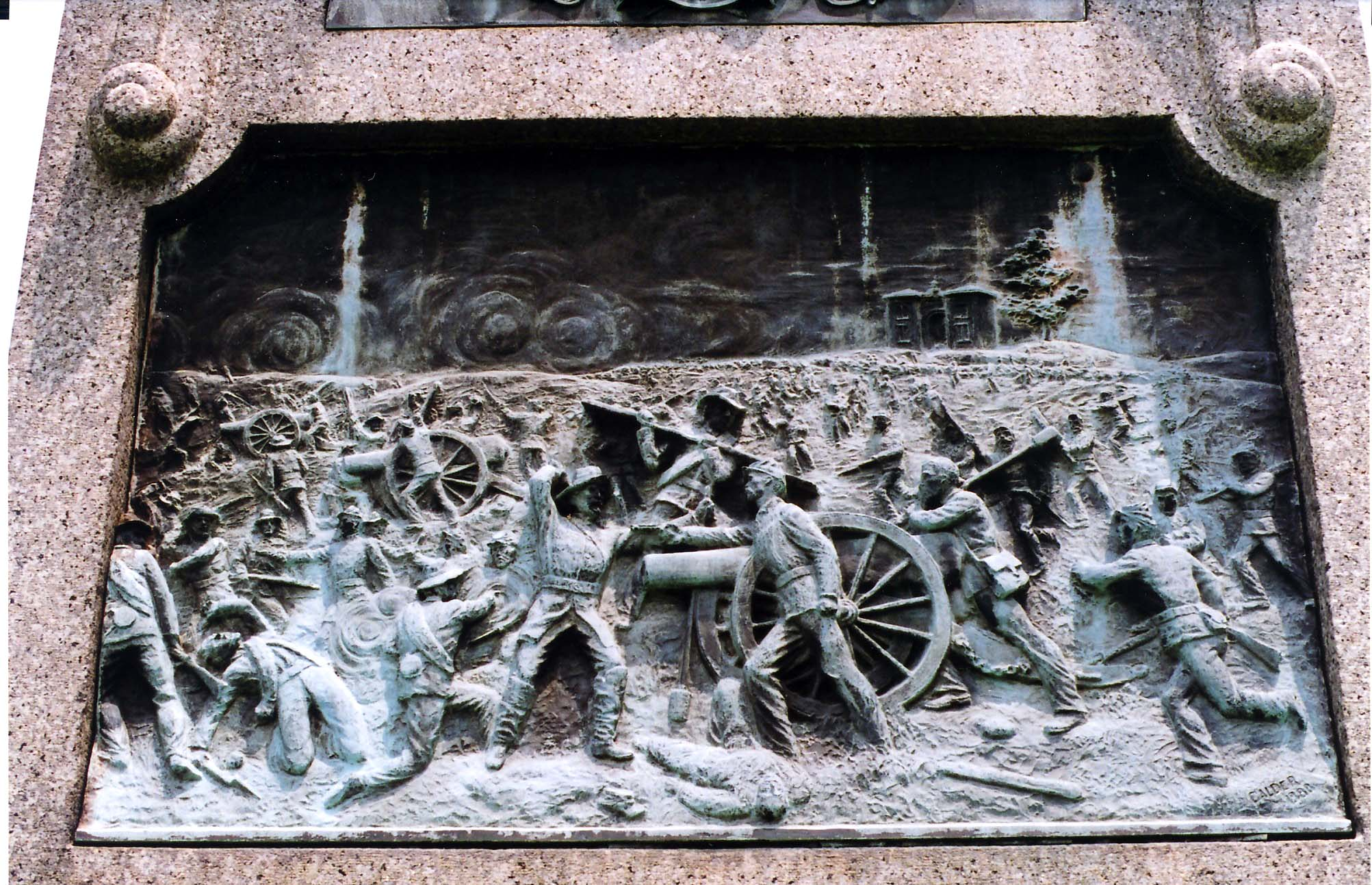
73rd Pennsylvania Infantry monument, Gettysburg Battlefield (1889)

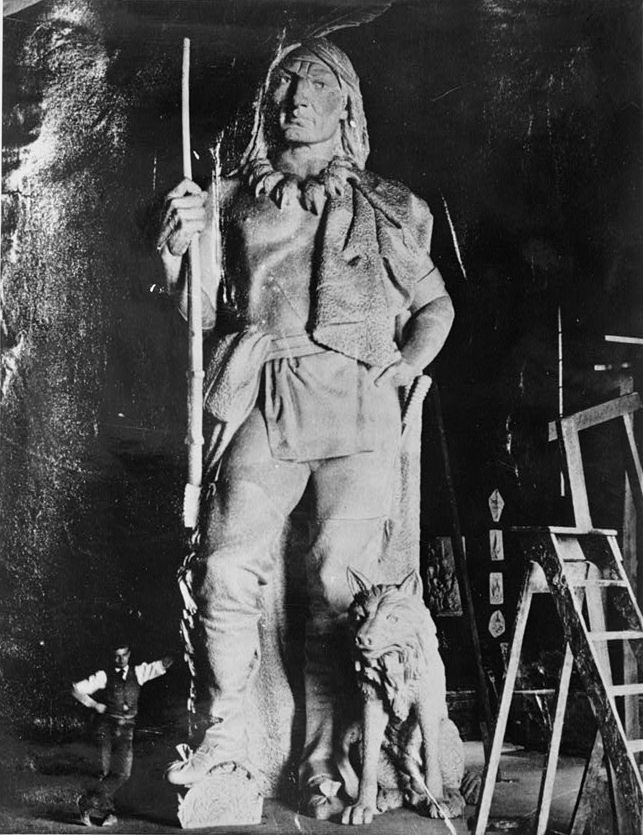
Indian Figure, prior to installation on City Hall, c. 1892

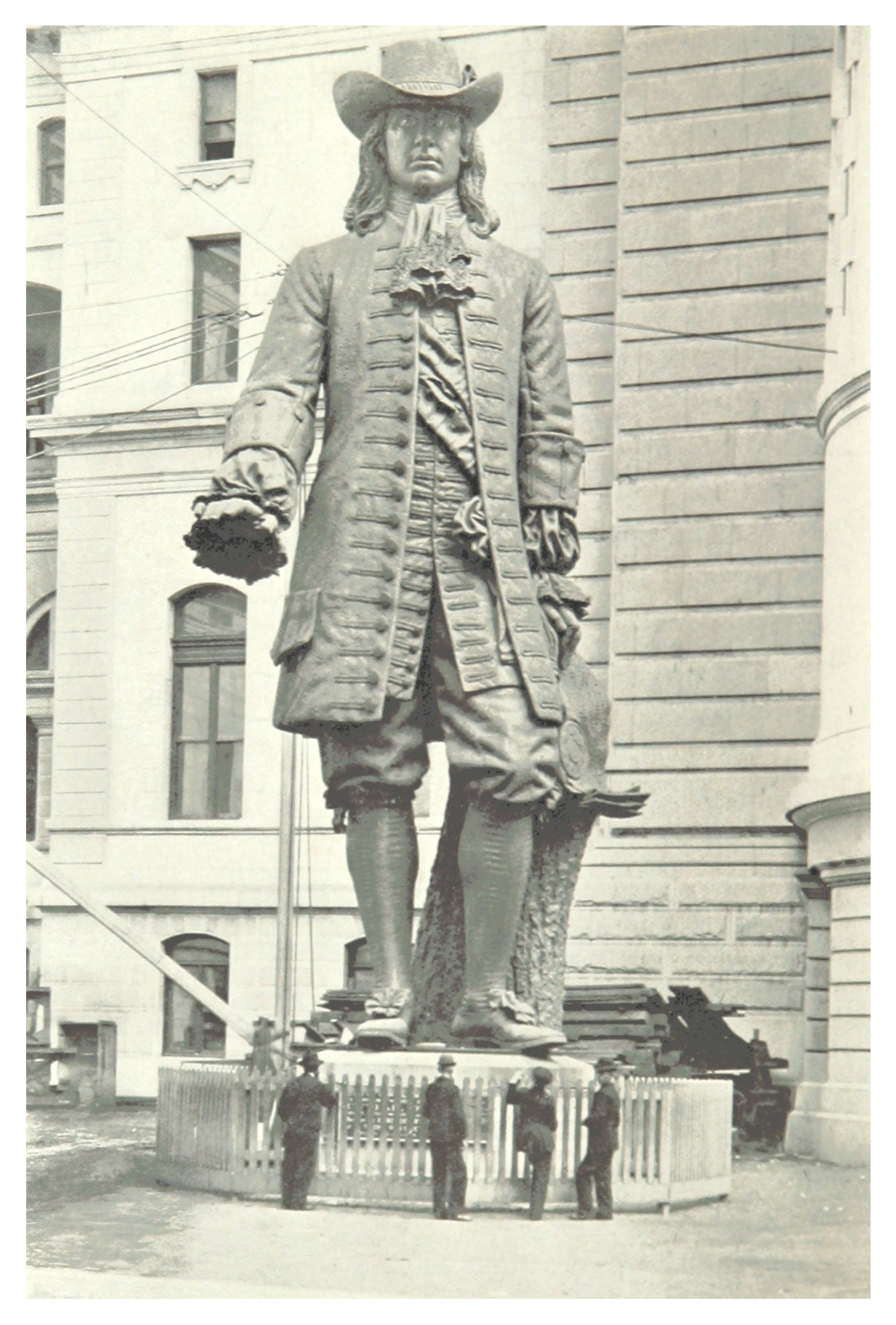
William Penn Statue on display in City Hall courtyard

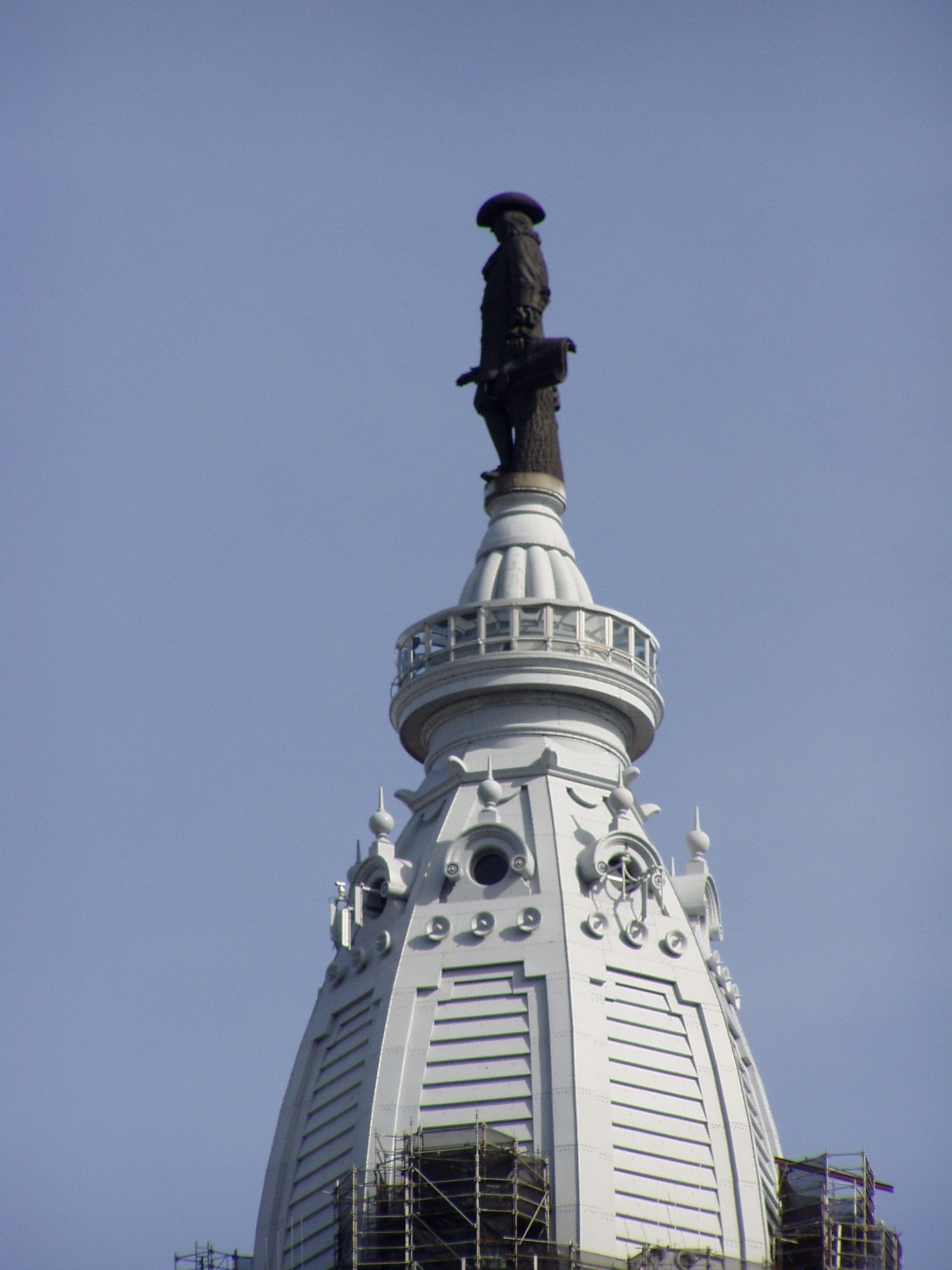
William Penn (1894), atop Philadelphia City Hall

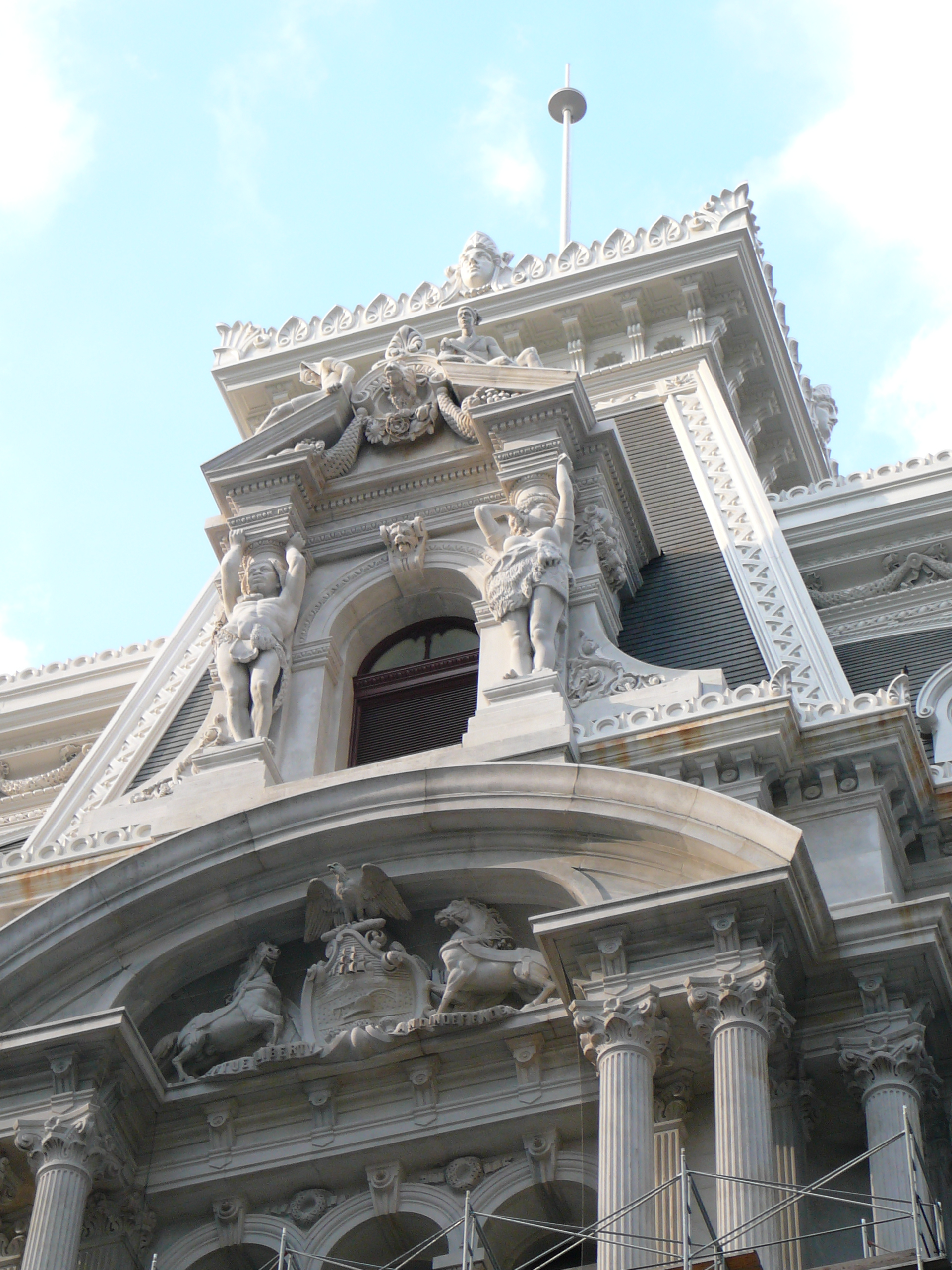
Architectural sculptures on the South Portal

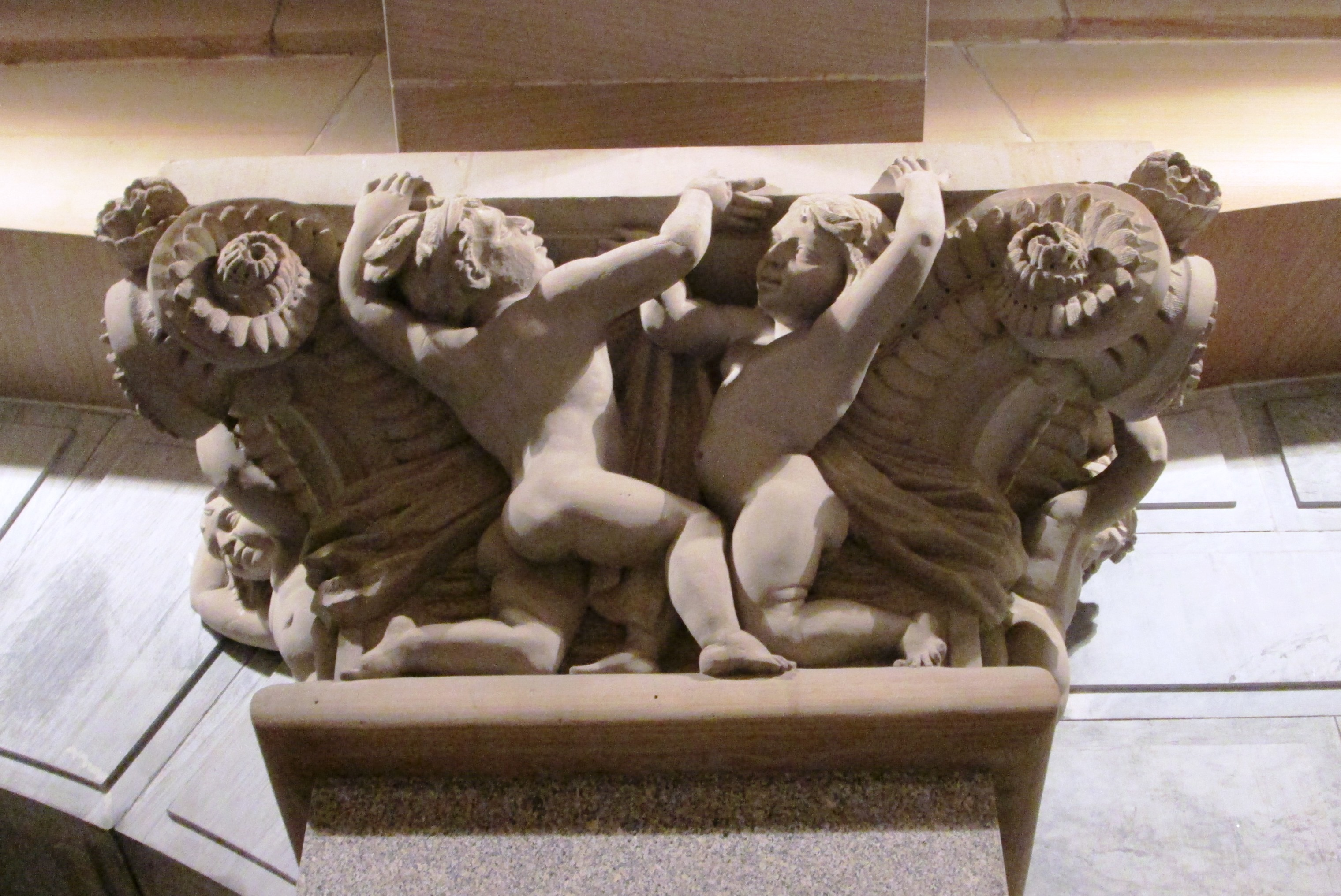
Sculptures on City Hall column capital

== Additional reading ==
- Bach, Penny Balkin, Public Art in Philadelphia, Temple University Press, Philadelphia, Pennsylvania, 1992 ISBN 0-87722-822-1
- Fairmount Park Association, Sculpture of a City: Philadelphia's Treasures in Bronze and Stone, Walker Publishing Co., Inc, NY. NY 1974 ISBN 0-8027-7100-9
- Hayes, Margaret Calder Three Alexander Calders, Paul S Eriksson Publisher, Middlebury, Vermont, 1977 ISBN 0-8397-8017-6
- Williams, Oliver P., County Courthouses of Pennsylvania: A Guide, Stackpole Books, Mechanicsburg, PA 2001 ISBN 0-8117-2738-6
