= William Penn (Calder) =

Sculpture by Alexander Milne Calder

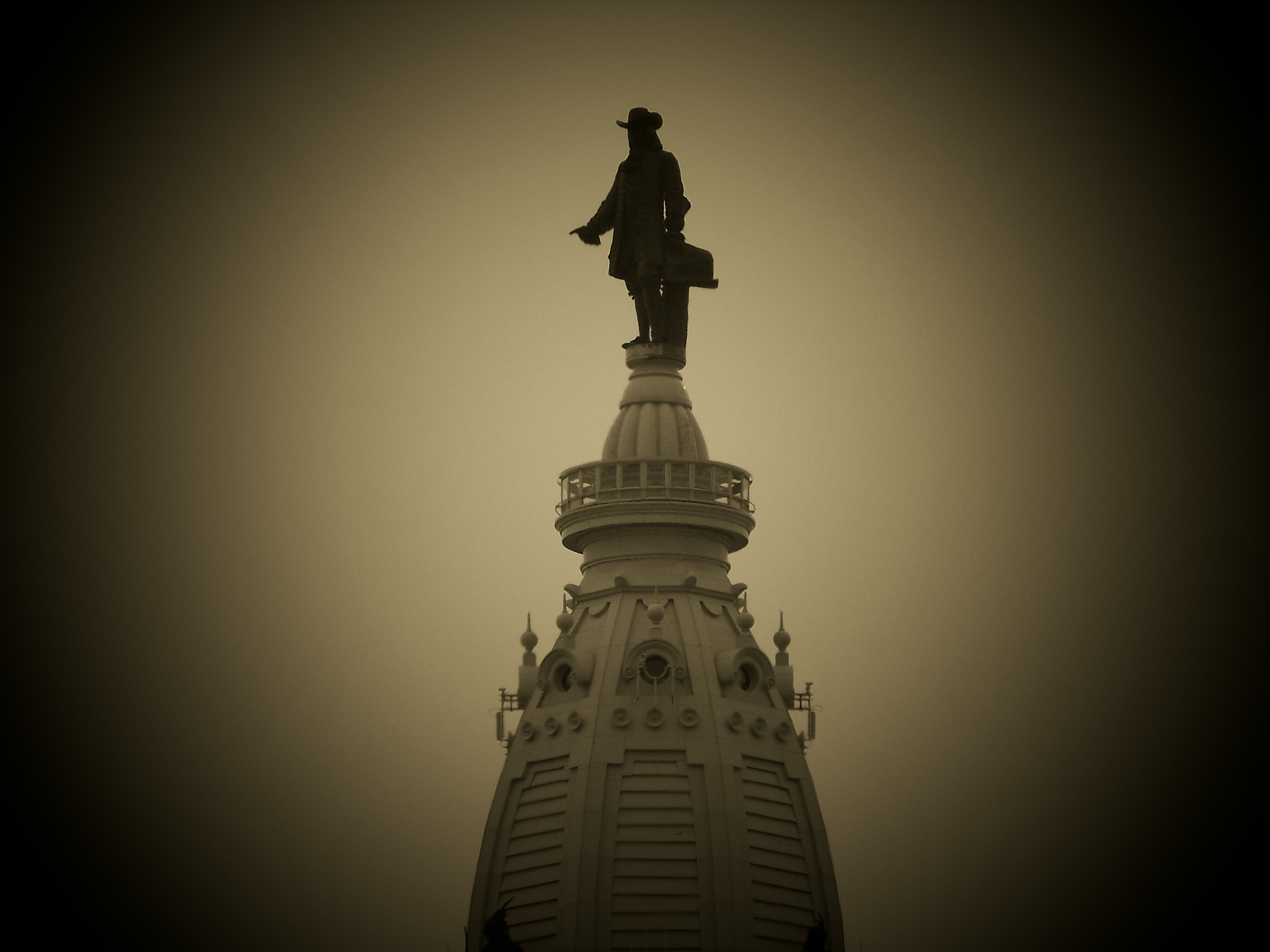
- The William Penn statue in January 2007
- Year: 1894; 132 years ago
- Type: Bronze
- Dimensions: (447 1/2 in)
- Location: Philadelphia, Pennsylvania, U.S.; 39°57′10″N 75°09′49″W
- Owner: City of Philadelphia

William Penn is a bronze statue of William Penn, the founder of the Commonwealth of Pennsylvania, by Alexander Milne Calder.

It is located atop the Philadelphia City Hall in Philadelphia, Pennsylvania. It was installed in 1894. It was cast in fourteen sections and took almost two years to finish.

For almost 90 years, an unwritten gentlemen's agreement, forbade any building in the city from rising above the hat on the Penn statue. This agreement ended in 1985, when final approval was given to the Liberty Place complex. Its centerpieces are two skyscrapers, One Liberty Place and Two Liberty Place, which rose well above the height of Penn's hat.

The statue is facing northeast towards Penn Treaty Park. The decision was made by the city's Public Buildings Commission over the objections of Calder who wanted it facing south to take advantage of the southern exposure.

A copy of the statue stands at Welcome Park. In 2024, the National Park Service proposed renovation of the park, which would include removal of the statue there.

== Gallery ==
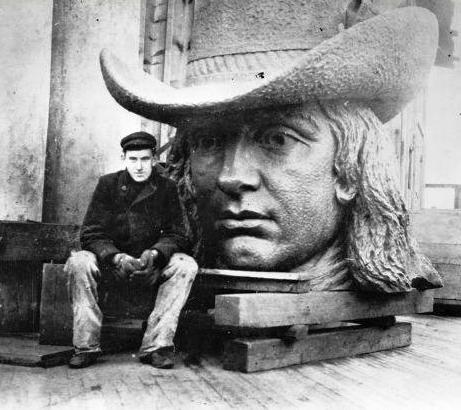
Sculptor Alexander Milne Calder, beside the head of William Penn, c.1893

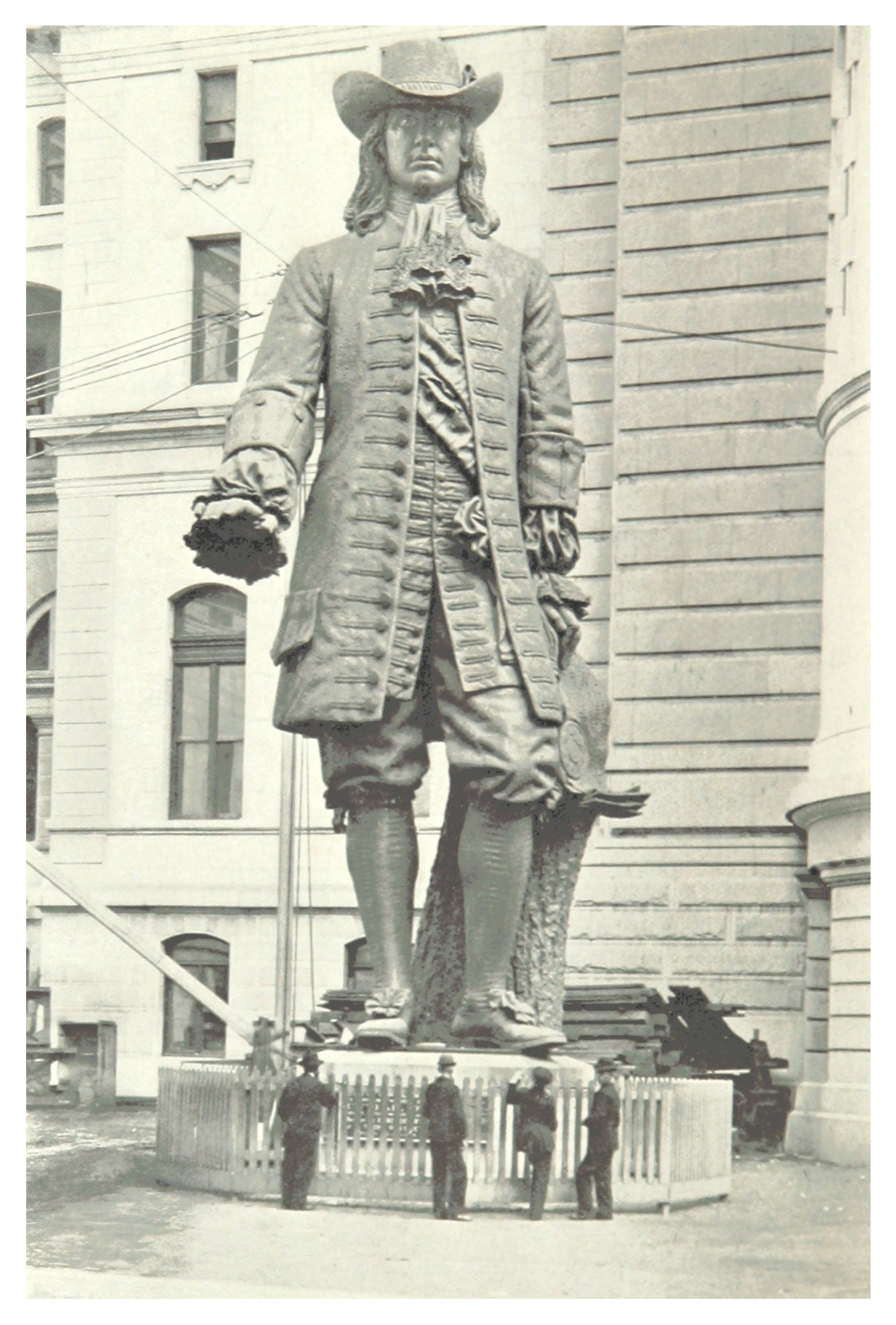
William Penn assembled in City Hall Courtyard, 1894, prior to being hauled to the top of the tower

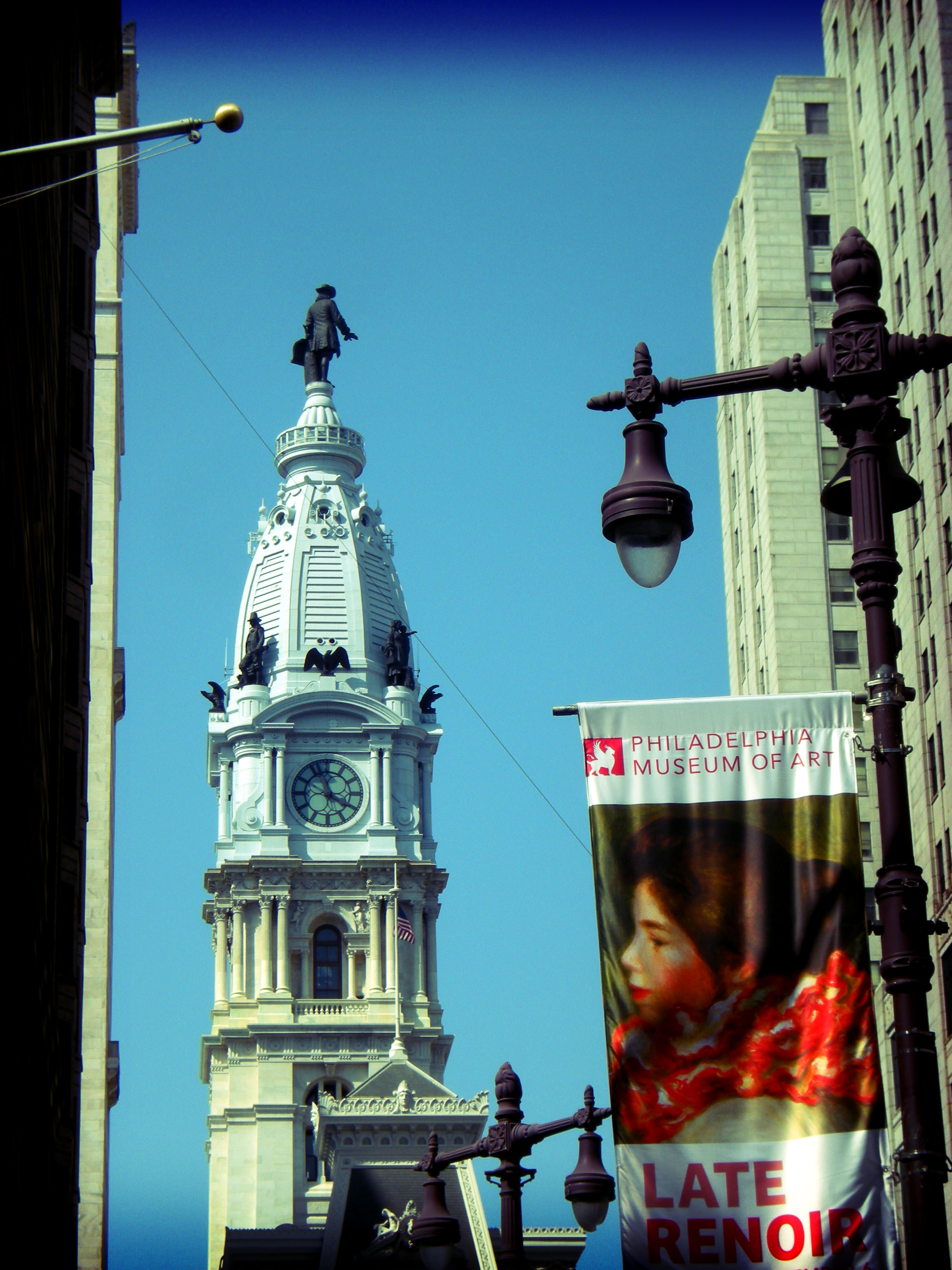
City Hall Tower from South Broad Street. William Penn faces northeast, to Shackamaxon, the site of his 1682 treaty with the Lenni Lenape.

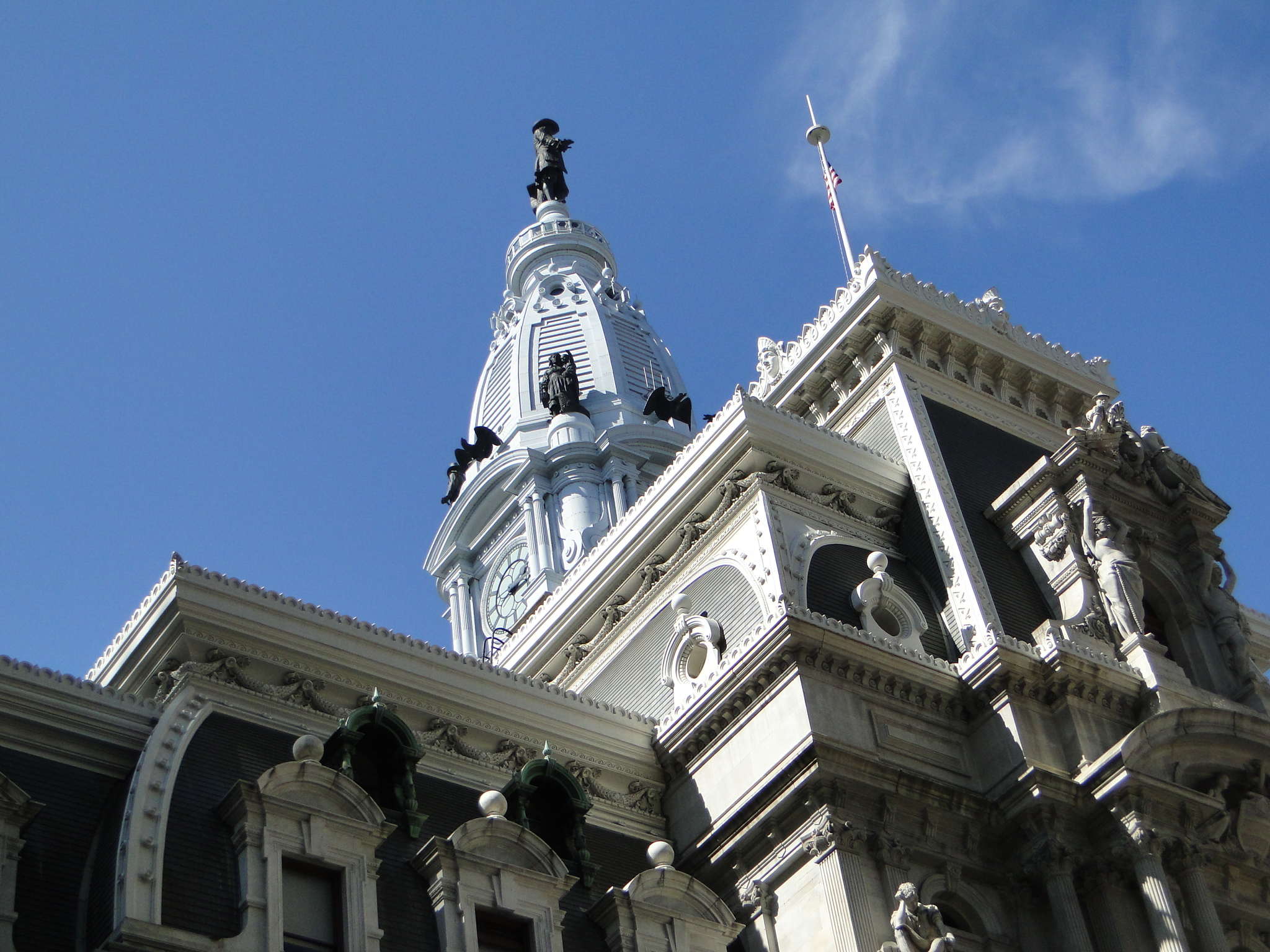
William Penn atop Philadelphia City Hall Tower, 2017

== See also ==
- Curse of Billy Penn
- List of public art in Philadelphia
