= Equestrian statue of George Meade (Philadelphia) =

Statue of George Meade in Philadelphia, PA, USA

Major General George Gordon Meade
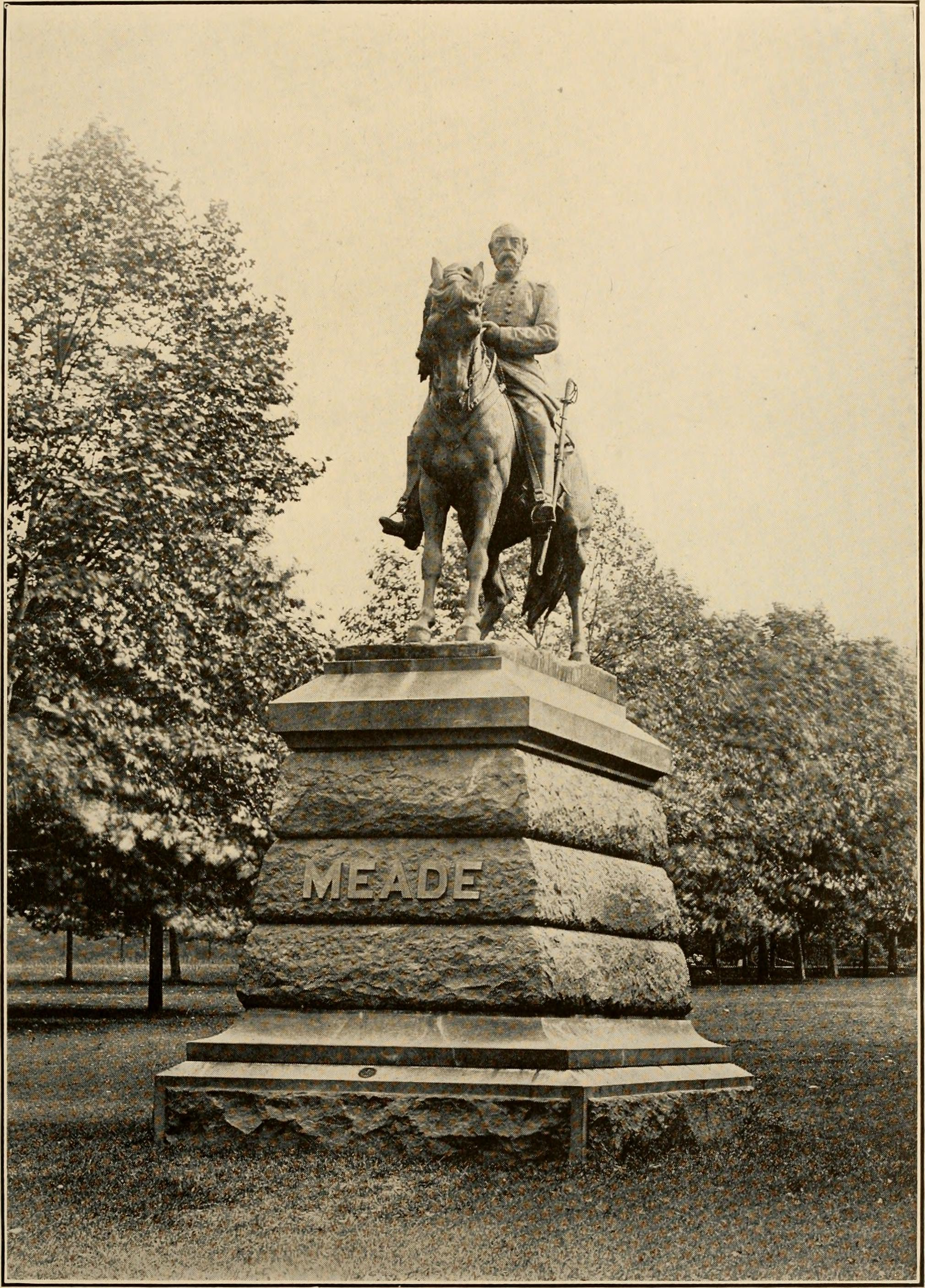
- The statue in 1918
- Location: Fairmount Park, Philadelphia, Pennsylvania, United States
- Coordinates: 39.980992°N 75.208050°W
- Designer: Alexander Milne Calder
- Fabricator: Henry Bonnard foundry
- Type: Equestrian statue
- Material: Bronze; Granite
- Length: 16.5 feet (5.0 m)
- Width: 10.7 feet (3.3 m)
- Height: 23.5 feet (7.2 m)
- Dedicated date: October 18, 1887
- Dedicated to: George Meade

Major General George Gordon Meade is an equestrian statue that stands in Philadelphia's Fairmount Park. The statue, which was unveiled in 1887, was designed by sculptor Alexander Milne Calder and honors George Meade, who served as a Major General in the Union Army during the American Civil War and was later a commissioner for the park. The statue is one of two statues of Meade at Fairmount, with the other one being a part of the Smith Memorial Arch.

== History ==
=== Background ===
George Meade was an 1835 graduate of the United States Military Academy who served as an officer in the United States Army during Mexican–American War and, later, the American Civil War. In the latter, Meade participated in the Eastern Theater and saw action at the Battle of Antietam in 1862. Meade was later made commander of the Union Army of the Potomac and delivered a devastating defeat to the Confederate Army of Northern Virginia at the Battle of Gettysburg. Meade would continue to command the army until the war's end in 1865. The following year, Meade became a commissioner of Fairmount Park in Philadelphia, Pennsylvania. In this position, he was responsible for designing the layout of many of the paths through the park. He died several years later in November 1872.

Following his death, the Fairmount Park Art Association (later renamed the Association for Public Art) created a committee to oversee the creation of a memorial for Meade. Fundraising soon commenced for what would be the association's first major commission. However, fundraising initially went poorly, due in part to the Panic of 1873 and competition from the Centennial Exposition. A group of 119 women constituting the Meade Memorial Women's Auxiliary Committee raised most of the $30,000 for the memorial. On October 19,1881, after a competition, sculptor Alexander Milne Calder was chosen as the sculptor for the monument. However, the project was subsequently shelved for several months while he continued to study at the Pennsylvania Academy of the Fine Arts under Thomas Eakins. In December 1883, the association contracted Calder for a plaster sketch model to be ready May 1, 1884. A full-sized working model was later prepared by June 10, 1886, and by December of that year, casting had begun. This was done at the Henry Bonnard foundry in New York City, and a July 1887 article in The New York Times reported that the casting process had by then been completed. Metal from Confederate cannons that had been captured during the war was used to make the statue. The work was Calder's first large-scale bronze project, and he based his depiction of Meade off of photographs and recollections from both himself and Meade's family members. He was paid $25,000 for his work.

The statue was initially planned to be located in front of Philadelphia City Hall, where today there are equestrian statues honoring fellow Union Army officers George B. McClellan and John F. Reynolds. However, Meade's family wanted the statue to be placed in Fairmount Park due to Meade's affinity for and personal connection to the park.

=== Dedication and later history ===
The statue was dedicated at Fairmount Park in a large ceremony held on October 18, 1887. Approximately 20,000 or 30,000 spectators were present for the unveiling. Several former Union officers were among those in attendance, including Joshua Lawrence Chamberlain, Fitz John Porter, and William B. Franklin, who had been Meade's superior during the Battle of Fredericksburg. Philadelphia Mayor Edwin Henry Fitler presided over the event, with music provided by both a chorus and the First Regiment Band. The ceremony began with an invocation by The Right Reverend Cortlandt Whitehead, bishop of the Episcopal Diocese of Pittsburgh. Following this, "America" was performed and Fitler made opening remarks. Benjamin H. Brewster then presented the statue, which was unveiled by two grandsons of Meade. George Henry Boker received the statue on behalf of the Fairmount Park Art Association, which was followed by an oration given by major general John Gibbon. The ceremony concluded with the doxology "Old Hundred". After the dedication, a reception was held at the Union League House that was attended by over 600 guests. Included among these were numerous military officers and veterans who had served with Meade, as well as several classmates who had attended the U.S. Military Academy with him. In addition, Pennsylvania Governor James A. Beaver was present.

While the location for the monument was initially a well-traveled area, a decline in the nearby neighborhood caused the statue to receive significantly fewer sightseers. By 1913, the Grand Army of the Republic attempted to have the statue relocated due to its somewhat neglected area, without success. The monument has been the subject of vandalism, and a 2013 history book on Meade noted that the statue is "neglected and obscure". In recent years, efforts have been made to relocate the statue to in front of Philadelphia City Hall.

In 1993, the monument was surveyed as part of the Save Outdoor Sculpture! initiative.

== Design ==
The monument consists of a bronze equestrian statue of Meade atop a granite pedestal. The statue has a height of 11.5 feet (3.5 m), a width of 4 feet (1.2 m), and a depth of 10 feet (3.0 m), while the pedestal has a height of 12 feet (3.7 m), a width of 10.7 feet (3.3 m), and a depth of 16.5 feet (5.0 m). (Note: The Smithsonian Institution Research Information System gives slightly different values for the measurements of the monument. The values used here are provided by the Association for Public Art.) Meade, depicted with a moustache and beard, is dressed in his military uniform and has a sword hanging by his left leg. His left hand is holding the reins, while his right hand holds his hat by the saddle. The horse is modeled after Old Baldy. The statue is located in West Fairmount Park, on Lansdowne Drive north of Memorial Hall, and is facing towards Laurel Hill Cemetery, where Meade is buried. On the right side of the pedestal is inscribed "CALDER SCULOR" [sic], while the left side has the inscription "HENRY BONNARD BRONZE CO. N.Y.". On the front of the pedestal is "MEADE". Additionally, foundry marks are located on the statue. An article covering the unveiling in The New York Times states that "[t]he design is a spirited one, and the execution all that could be desired".

== See also ==
- 1887 in art
- List of equestrian statues in the United States
- List of public art in Philadelphia

== Bibliography ==
- Unveiling of the equestrian statue of Major-General George Gordon Meade. Fairmount Park Art Association. Philadelphia: Allen, Lane & Scott. 1887 – via Internet Archive.
- Huntington, Tom (2013). Searching for George Gordon Meade: The Forgotten Victor of Gettysburg. Stackpole Books. ISBN 978-0-8117-0813-5 – via Google Books.
