= Philadelphia City Hall =

City hall of Philadelphia

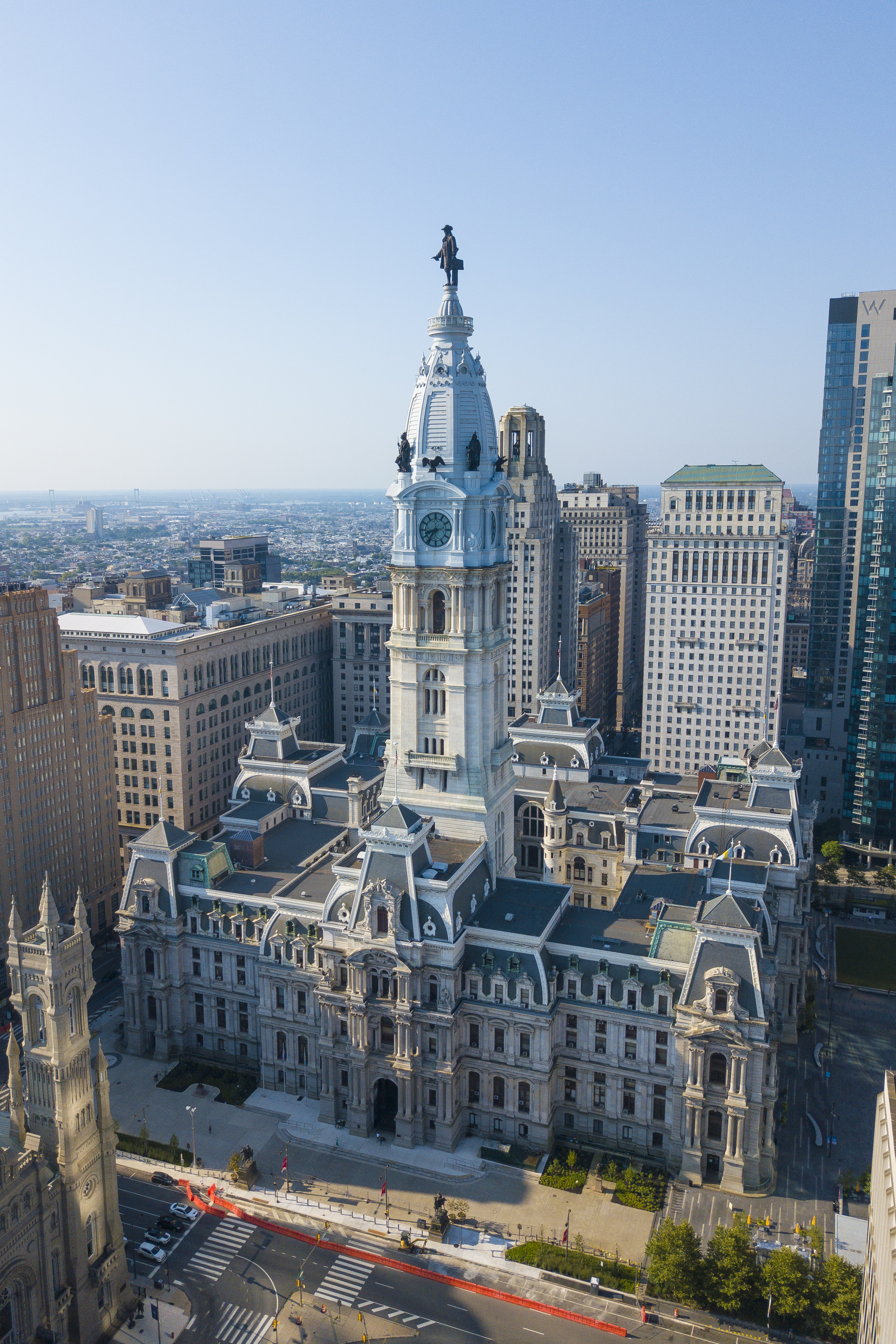
- North face of Philadelphia City Hall in July 2019

Record height
- Tallest in the world from 1894 to 1908^{[I]}
- Preceded by: Ulm Minster
- Surpassed by: Singer Building

General information
- Status: Completed
- Architectural style: Second Empire
- Location: 1 Penn Square; Philadelphia, Pennsylvania, U.S.
- Coordinates: 39°57′8.62″N 75°9′48.95″W
- Topped-out: 1894 occupied from 1877
- Completed: 1901; 125 years ago
- Governing body: Cherelle Parker, Mayor of Philadelphia (2024–present)

Height
- Antenna spire: 548 ft (167 m)

Technical details
- Floor count: 9
- Floor area: 630,000 sq ft (59,000 m^{2})

Design and construction
- Architects: John McArthur Jr. Thomas U. Walter

U.S. National Historic Landmark
- Designated: December 16, 1976
- Reference no.: 75001206

U.S. National Register of Historic Places
- Designated: December 8, 1976
- Reference no.: 76001666

The Philadelphia City Hall is the seat of the municipal government of the City of Philadelphia in the U.S. state of Pennsylvania. Built in the ornate Second Empire style, City Hall houses the chambers of the Philadelphia City Council and the offices of the Mayor of Philadelphia.

This building is also a courthouse, serving as the seat of the First Judicial District of Pennsylvania. It houses the Civil Trial and Orphans' Court Divisions of the Court of Common Pleas of Philadelphia County. It also houses the Philadelphia facilities for the Supreme Court of Pennsylvania (which also holds session and accepts filings in Harrisburg and Pittsburgh).

Built using brick, white marble and limestone, Philadelphia City Hall is the world's largest free-standing masonry building (since the 1953 Mole Antonelliana spire collapse) and was the world's tallest habitable building upon its completion in 1894. It was designated as a National Historic Landmark in 1976; in 2006, it was also named a National Historic Civil Engineering Landmark by the American Society of Civil Engineers. It was regarded as the world's tallest building until 1908 when surpassed by the Singer Building, and it was the world's tallest clock tower until 1909 when surpassed by the Metropolitan Life Insurance Company Tower. It was the tallest building in Philadelphia until 1987 when it was surpassed by the Liberty Place.

== History and description ==
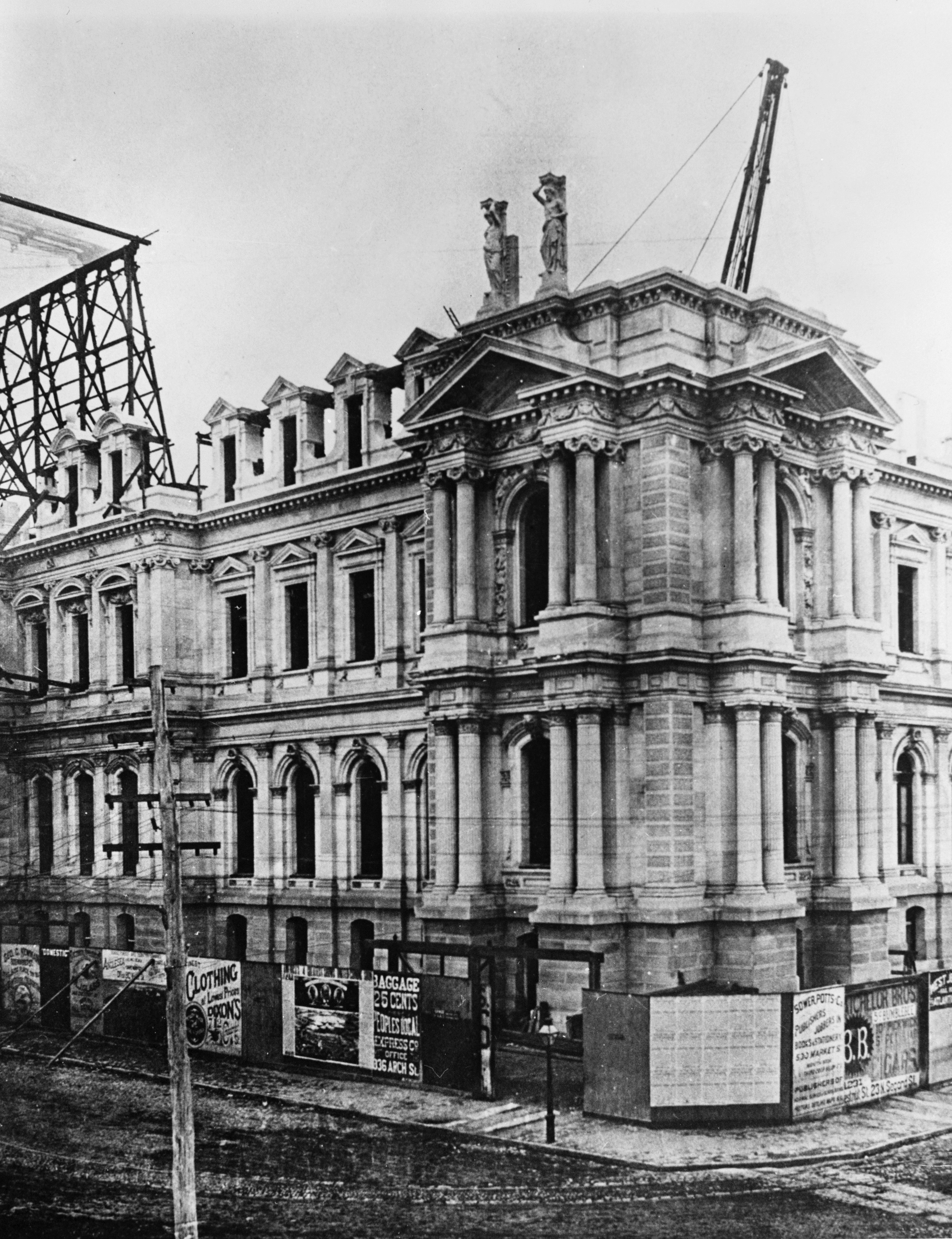
Philadelphia City Hall under construction in 1881

The building was designed by Scottish-born architect John McArthur Jr. (1823–1890), and Thomas Ustick Walter (1804–1887). in the French Second Empire style of architecture, and was constructed from 1871 to 1901 at a cost of $24 million (equivalent to $741 million in 2025). The City Hall's tower was completed by 1894, although the interior was not finished until 1901. Designed to be the world's tallest building, it was surpassed during the phase of construction by the Washington Monument (of Washington, D.C.), the Eiffel Tower (in Paris, France), and the Mole Antonelliana. The Mole Antonelliana was a few feet taller and was the tallest masonry (i.e. without the use of steel) building in the world until 1953. In that year a storm caused the spire to collapse and so the Philadelphia City Hall then became the tallest masonry building in the world (excluding monuments). Upon completion of its tower in 1894, it became the world's tallest habitable building. It was also the first secular building to have this distinction, as all previous world's tallest buildings were religious structures, including European cathedrals and—for the previous 3,800 years—the Great Pyramid of Giza; even the Mole Antonelliana was supposed to be a religious building—a synagogue—but then received a different use.

The location chosen was one of the five center city urban park squares dedicated by William Penn, that geometrically is the center to the other four squares within Center City renamed as Penn Square. City Hall is a masonry building whose weight is borne by granite and brick walls up to 22 ft (6.7 m) thick. The principal exterior materials are limestone, granite, and marble. The original design called for virtually no sculpture. The stonemason William Struthers and sculptor Alexander Milne Calder were responsible for the more than 250 sculptures, capturing artists, educators, and engineers who embodied American ideals and contributed to this country's genius. The city spent a total of $24.6 million on the erection of the building between 1870 and 1904.

At 548 ft (167 m), including the statue of city founder William Penn atop its tower, City Hall was the tallest habitable building in the world from 1894 to 1908. It remained the tallest in Pennsylvania until it was surpassed in 1932 by the Gulf Tower in Pittsburgh; it is now the 16th tallest. It was the tallest in Philadelphia until 1986 when the construction of One Liberty Place surpassed it, ending the informal gentlemen's agreement that had limited the height of buildings in the city to no higher than the Penn statue.

It was constructed over the time span from 1871 to 1901 and includes 700 rooms dedicated for uses of various governmental operations. The building structure used over 88 million bricks and thousands of tons of marble and granite. With almost 700 rooms, City Hall is the largest municipal building in the United States and one of the largest in the world. The building houses three branches of government: the city's executive branch (the Mayor's Office), its legislature (the Philadelphia City Council), and a substantial portion of the judicial activity in the city (the Civil Division and Orphan's Court of the Pennsylvania Court of Common Pleas for the First Judicial District are housed there, as well as chambers for some criminal judges and some judges of the Philadelphia Municipal Court).

It was the tallest clock tower in the world when it was completed; it was surpassed by the Metropolitan Life Insurance Company Tower in 1912, and is currently the 5th tallest building of this type. The tower features a clock face on each side that is 26 ft (7.9 m) in diameter. The clock faces are larger in diameter than those on Big Ben which measure 23 ft (7 m). City Hall's clock was designed by Warren Johnson and built in 1898. The 1937 Philadelphia Guide noted that "shortly after the clock was installed the city inaugurated a custom which still continues. Every evening at three minutes of nine the tower lights are turned off, and then turned on again on the hour. This enables those within observation distance, though unable to see the hands, to set their timepieces. There are four bronze eagles, each weighing three tons with 12 ft (3.7 m) wingspans, perched above the tower's four clocks.

City Hall's observation deck is located directly below the base of the statue, about 500 ft (150 m) above street level. Once enclosed with chain-link fencing, the observation deck is now enclosed by glass. It is reached in a 6-person elevator whose glass panels allow visitors to see the interior of the iron superstructure that caps the tower and supports the statuary and clocks. Stairs within the tower are only used for emergency exit. The ornamentation of the tower has been simplified; the huge garlands that festooned the top panels of the tower were removed.

In the 1950s, the city council investigated tearing down City Hall for a new building elsewhere, but abandoned the plan due to the high cost of the demolition.

Beginning in 1992, Philadelphia City Hall underwent a comprehensive exterior restoration, planned and supervised by the Historical Preservation Studio of Vitetta Architects & Engineers, headed by renowned historical preservation architect Hyman Myers. The majority of the restoration was completed by 2007, although some work has continued, including the installation of four new ornamental courtyard gates, based on an original architectural sketch, in December 2015.

The building was voted 21st on the American Institute of Architects' list of Americans' 150 favorite U.S. structures in 2007.

== William Penn statue ==
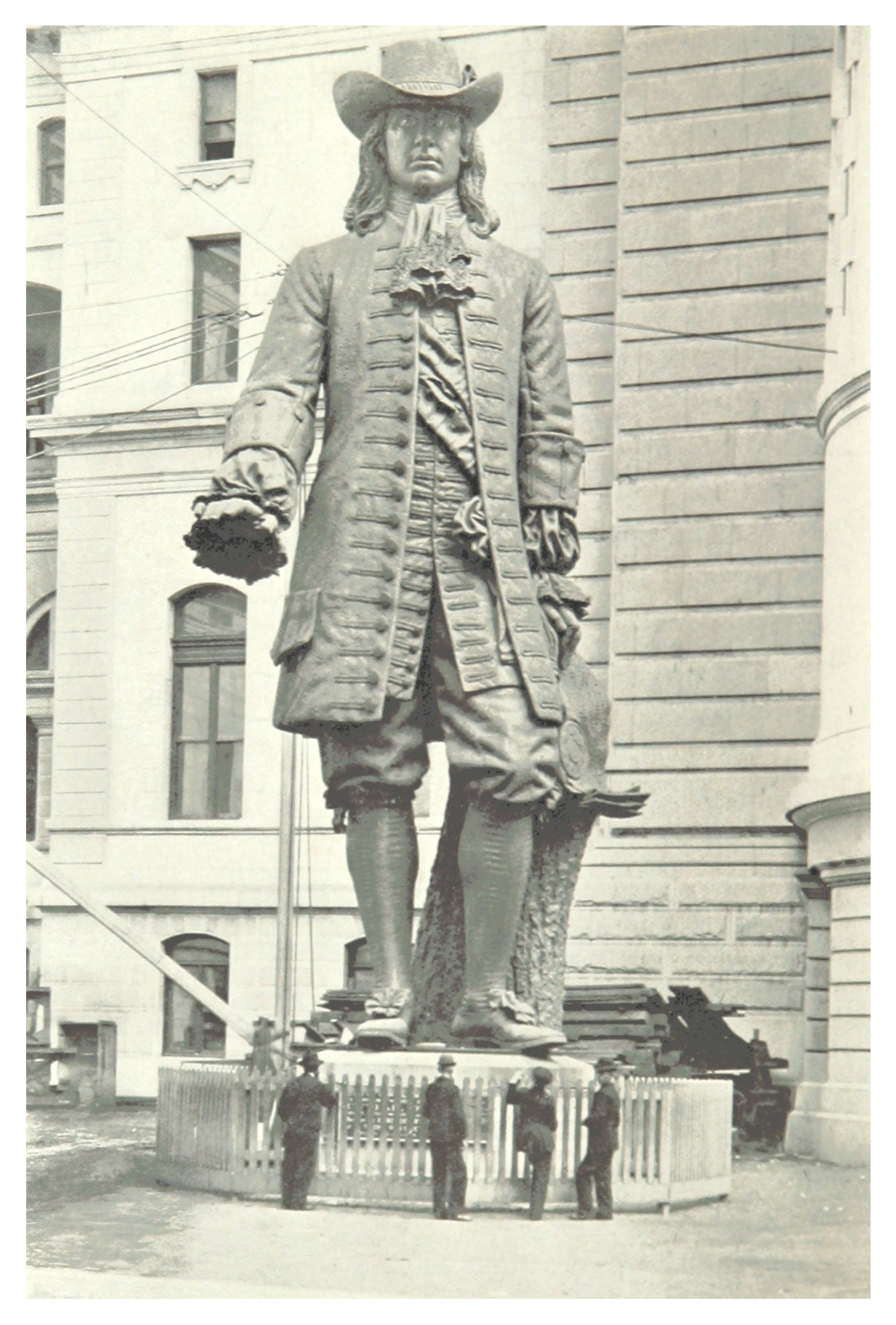
The William Penn statue prior to its placement atop the Philadelphia City Hall in 1894

The center of municipal government building is topped by a 37 ft (11 m) bronze statue weighing 53,348 lb (24,198 kg) of state and city founder William Penn (1644–1718), one of the 250 sculptures created by Alexander Milne Calder (1846–1923), that adorn the building inside and out. The statue was cast at the Tacony Iron Works of Northeast Philadelphia and hoisted to the top of the tower in fourteen sections in 1894, seven years before the building was declared completed in 1901. The William Penn statue is the tallest atop any building in the world.

Despite its lofty perch, the city has mandated that the statue be cleaned about every decade / ten years to remove corrosion and reduce metal deterioration due to weathering, with the latest cleaning done in May 2017. Penn's statue is hollow, and a narrow access tunnel through it from beneath in the stone / masonry and steel framing of the clock tower leads to a 22-inch-diameter (56 cm) hatch atop the hat.

Artist / sculptor Calder wished the statue to face south towards the Delaware River and Bay, so that its face would be lit by the sun most of the day, and the better to reveal the details of his work. But the statue in reality, actually faces to the northeast, towards Penn Treaty Park in the Fishtown section of the city, which commemorates the site where Penn signed a treaty with the local Native American tribe. Pennsbury Manor, Penn's country home in Bucks County, is also located to the northeast.

By the terms of a gentlemen's agreement that forbade any other structure later built in the city from rising above the hat on the famous William Penn statue, so for decades, the Philadelphia City Hall remained the tallest building in the city until it was surpassed by the skyscraper One Liberty Place in 1986. The abrogation of this municipal agreement in local folklore of the nicknamed Curse of Billy Penn, supposedly brought down a curse onto local professional sports teams. Twice during the 1990s, the statue was partially clothed in a major league sports team's uniform when they were in contention for a championship: a Philadelphia Phillies baseball cap in 1993 and a Philadelphia Flyers ice hockey team jersey in 1997—both teams lost however. The supposed curse ended 22 years later when the Philadelphia Phillies professional Major League Baseball team in the National League won the 2008 World Series, a year and four months after a small William Penn statuette had been affixed to the final steel beam of the Comcast Center during its topping out ceremony in June 2007. Another Penn statuette was placed on the topmost beam of the Comcast Technology Center in November 2017, and the Eagles won the Super Bowl a few months later.

== Centre Square ==
City Hall is situated on land that was reserved as a public square upon the city's founding in 1682. Originally known as Centre Square—later renamed Penn Square—it was used for public gatherings until the construction of City Hall began in 1871. Centre Square was one of the five original squares of Philadelphia laid out on the city grid by William Penn. The square had been located at the geographic center of Penn's city plan, but the Act of Consolidation in 1854 created the much larger and coterminous city and county of Philadelphia. Though no longer at the exact center of the city, the square remains situated in the center of the historic area between the Delaware and Schuylkill rivers; an area which is now called Center City.

Penn had intended that Centre Square be the central focus point where the major public buildings would be located, including those for government, religion, and education, as well as the central marketplace. However, the Delaware riverfront would remain the de facto economic and social heart of the city for more than a century.

== Film appearances ==
City Hall has been a filming location for several motion pictures including Rocky (1976), Blow Out (1981), Trading Places (1983), Philadelphia (1993), 12 Monkeys (1995), National Treasure (2004), Transformers: Revenge of the Fallen (2009), Law Abiding Citizen (2009), and Limitless (2011).

== Gallery ==
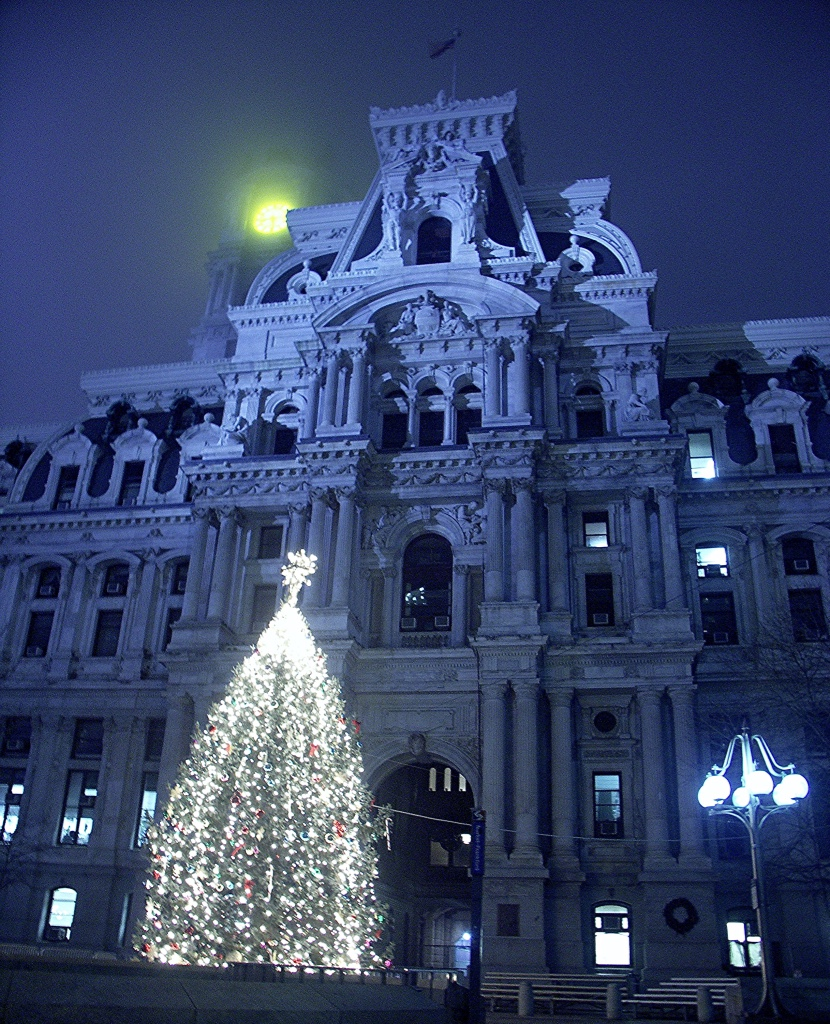
City Hall's Dilworth Plaza at Christmas in 2005

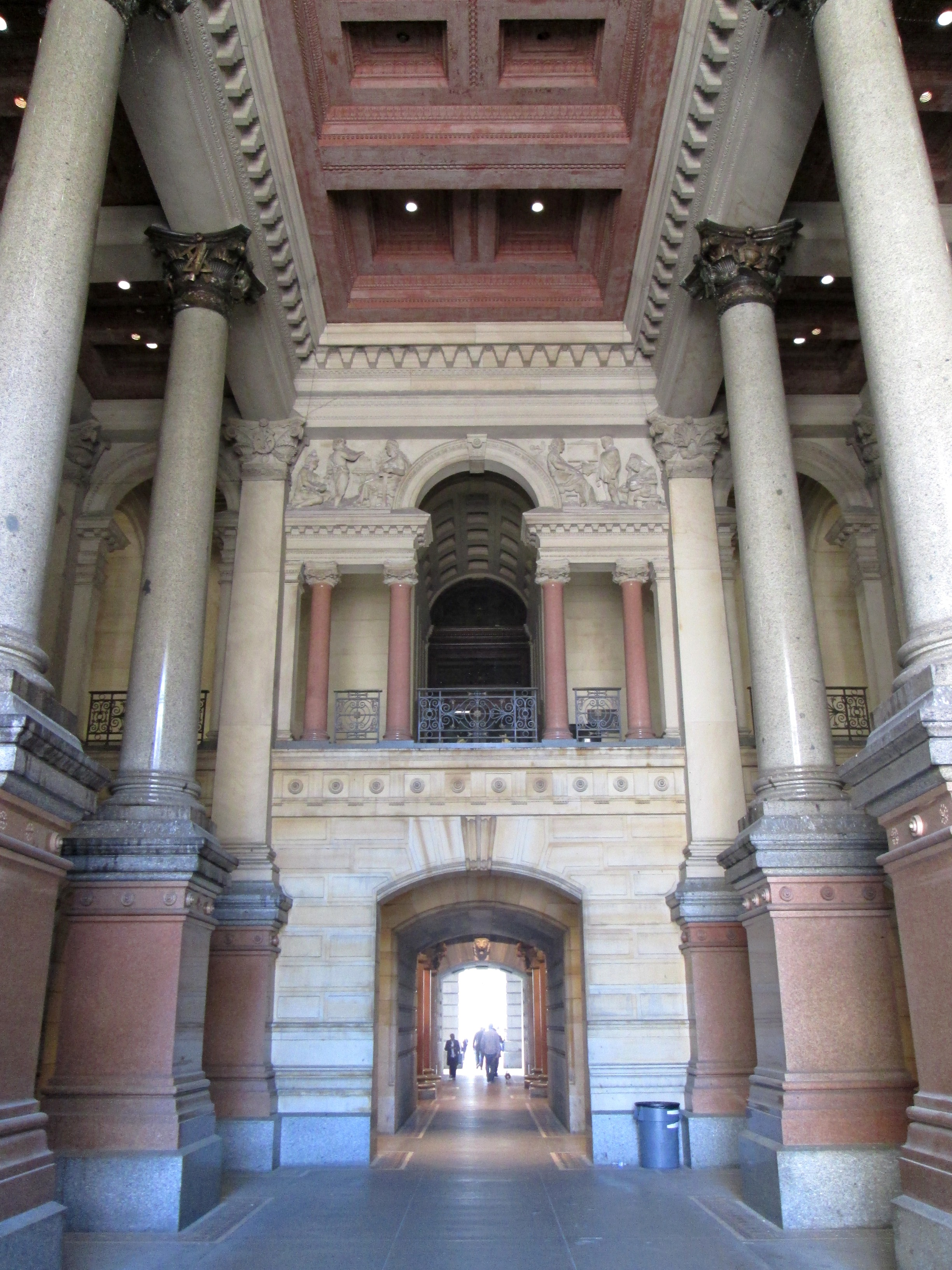
The North Broad Street arcade

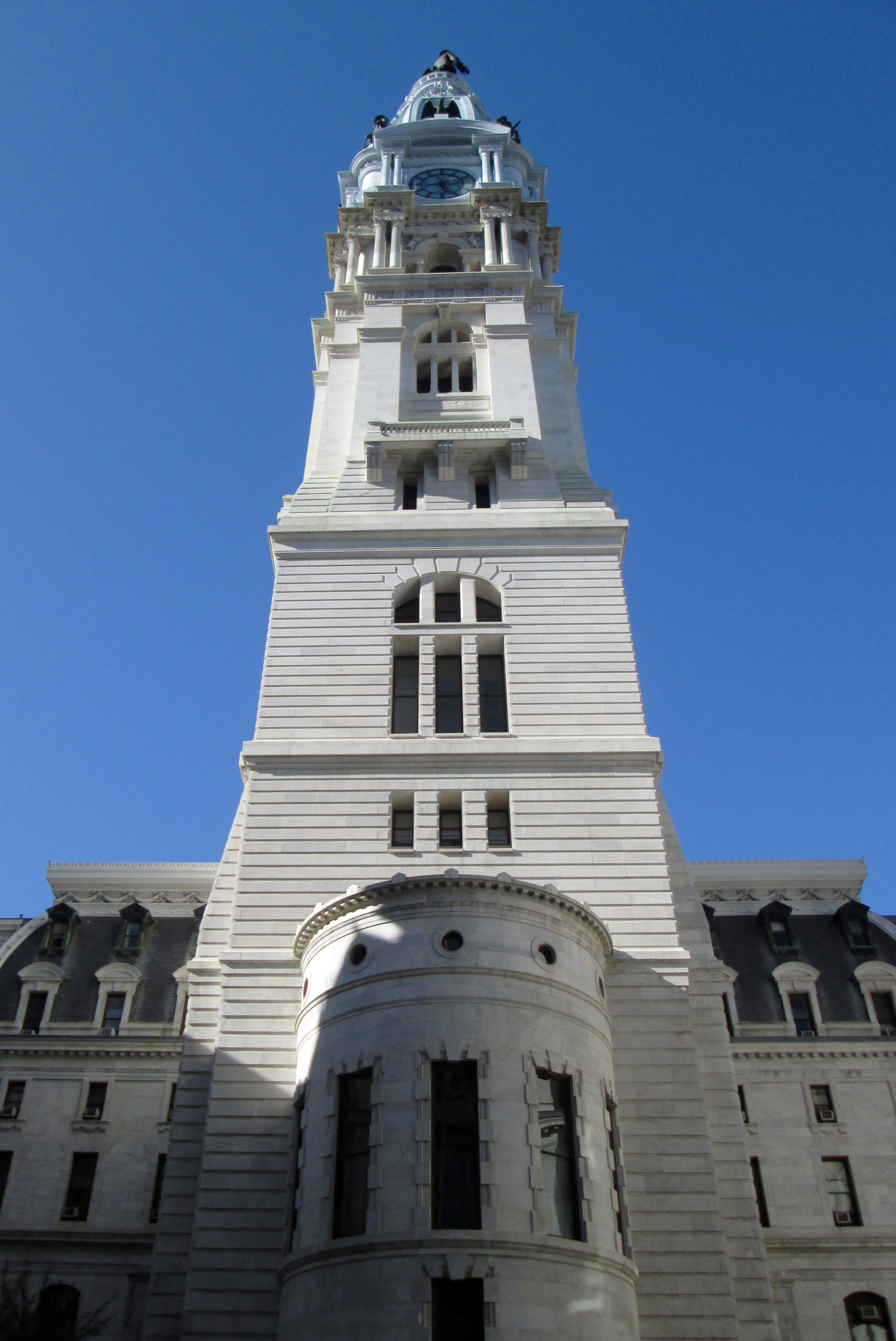
View from City Hall's courtyard

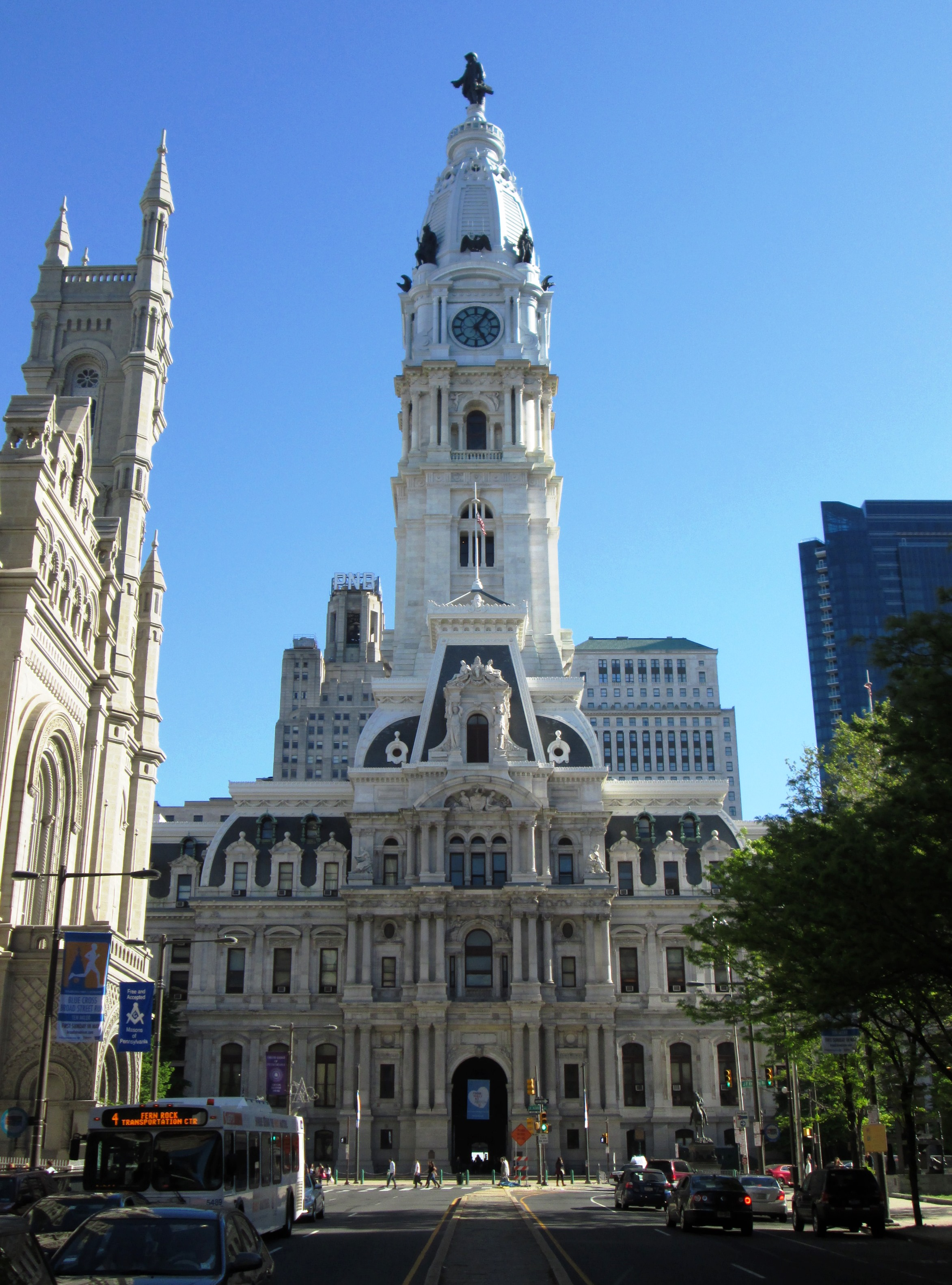
Northern view of City Hall from North Broad Street

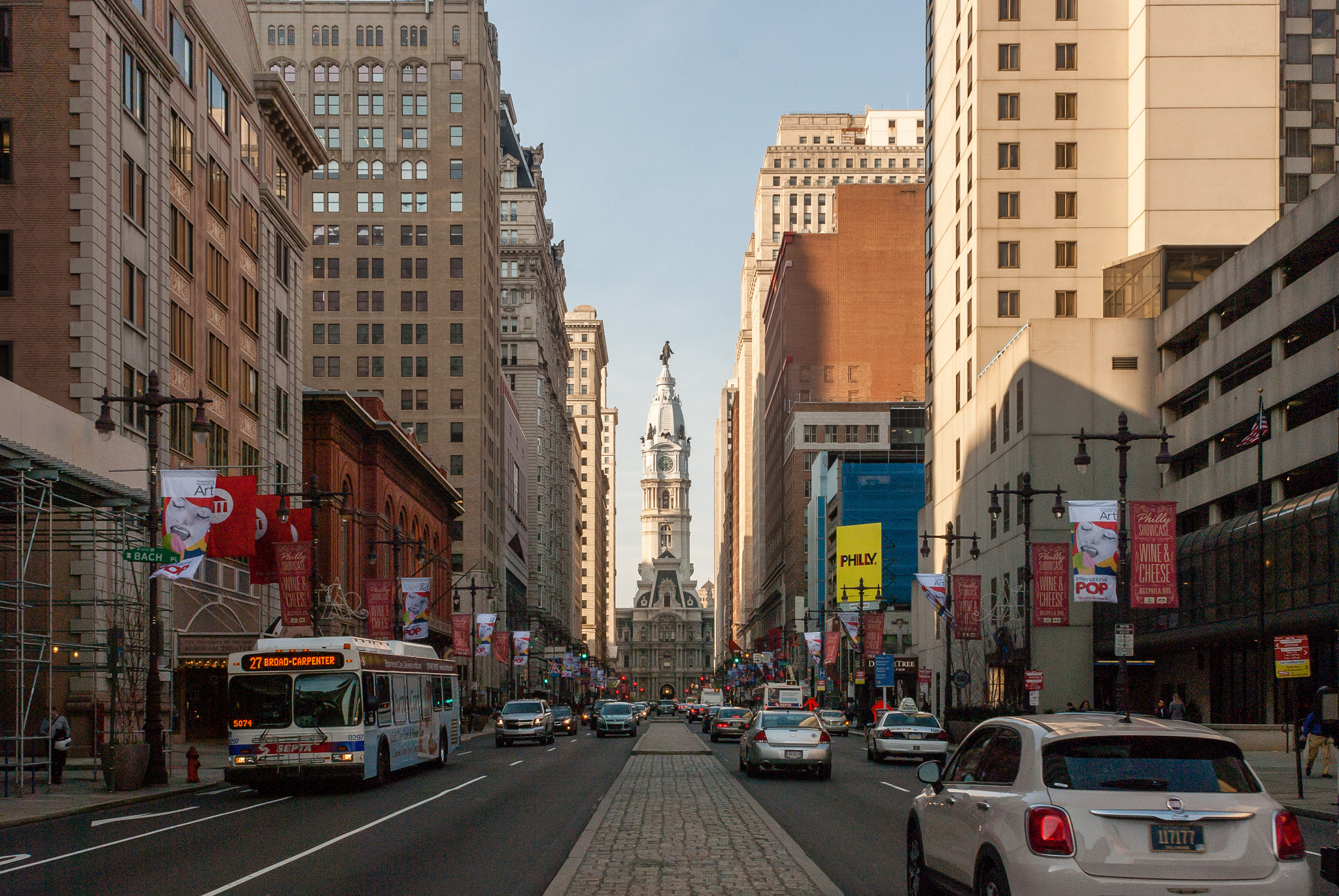
Southern view of City Hall from South Broad Street

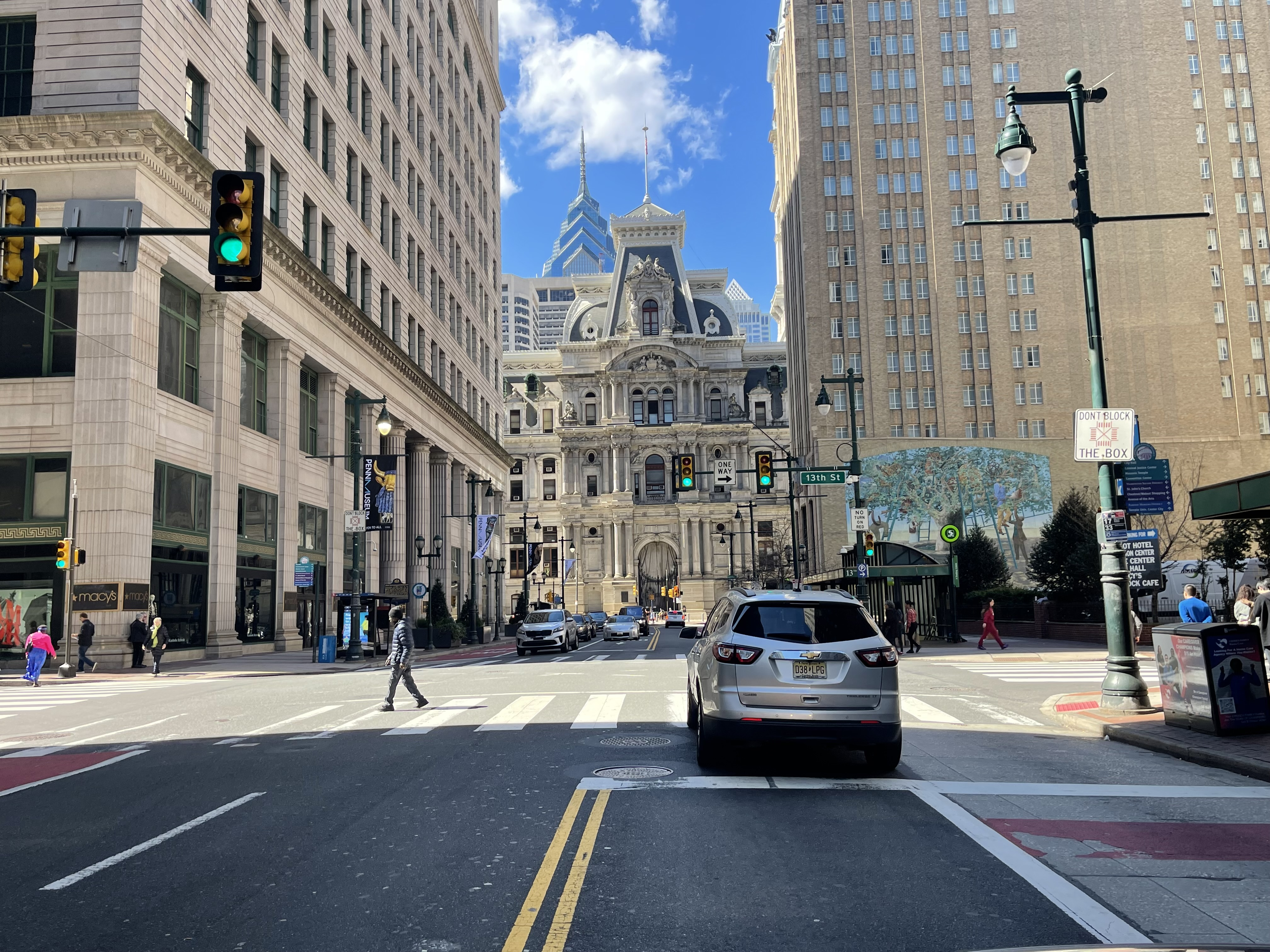
Eastern view of City Hall from Market Street

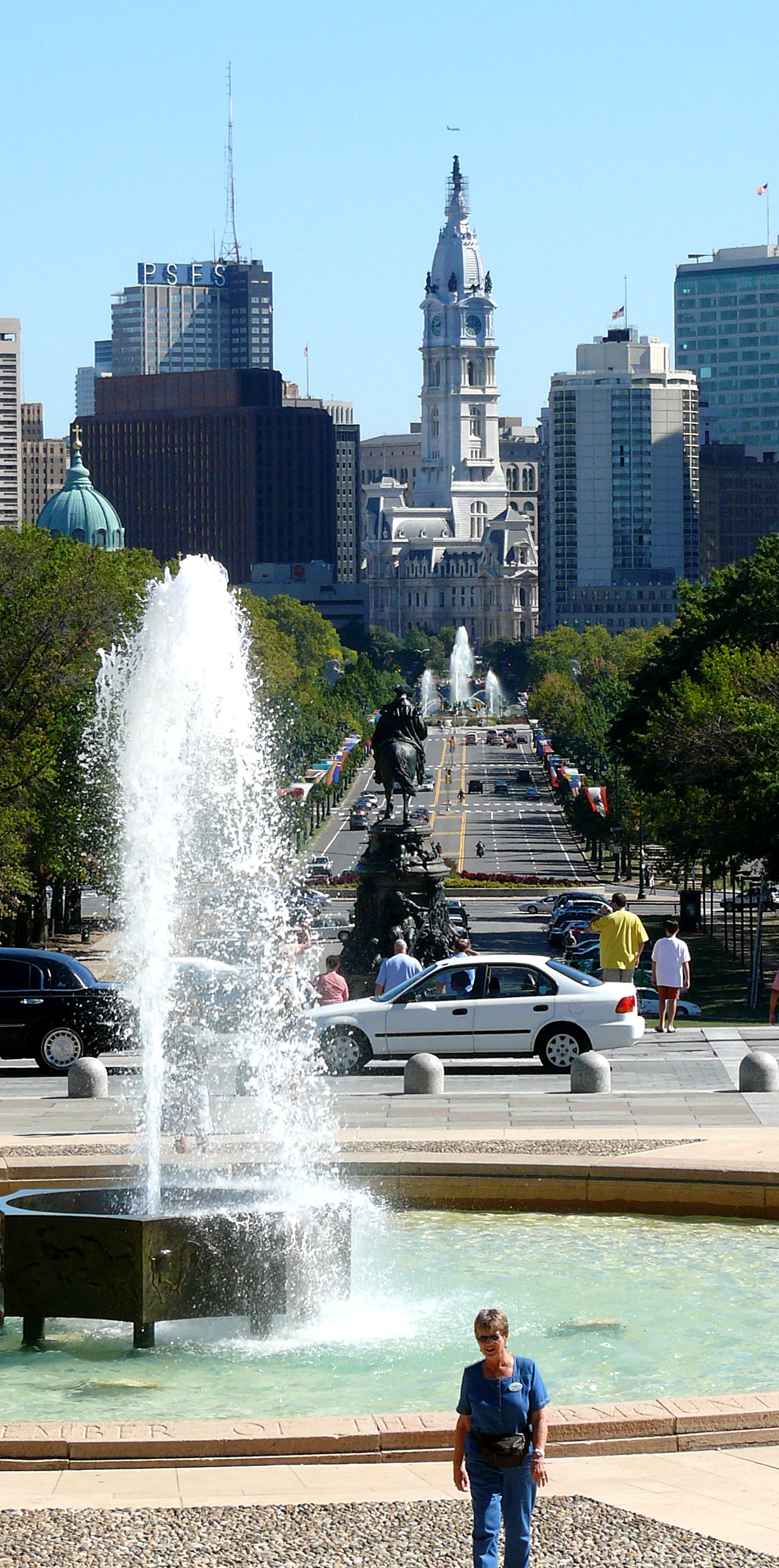
Northwestern view of City Hall from the Ben Franklin Parkway

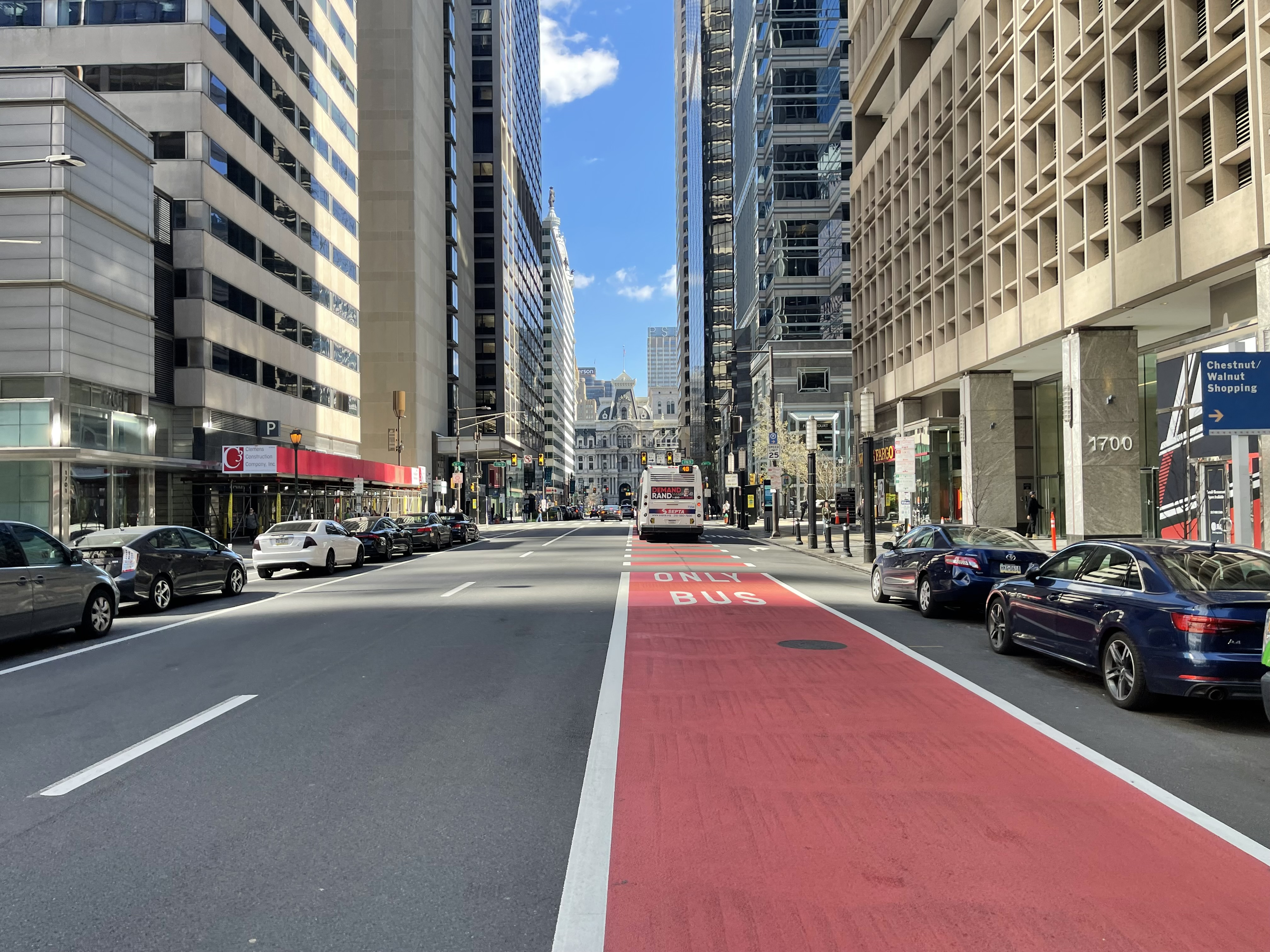
Western view of City Hall from Market Street

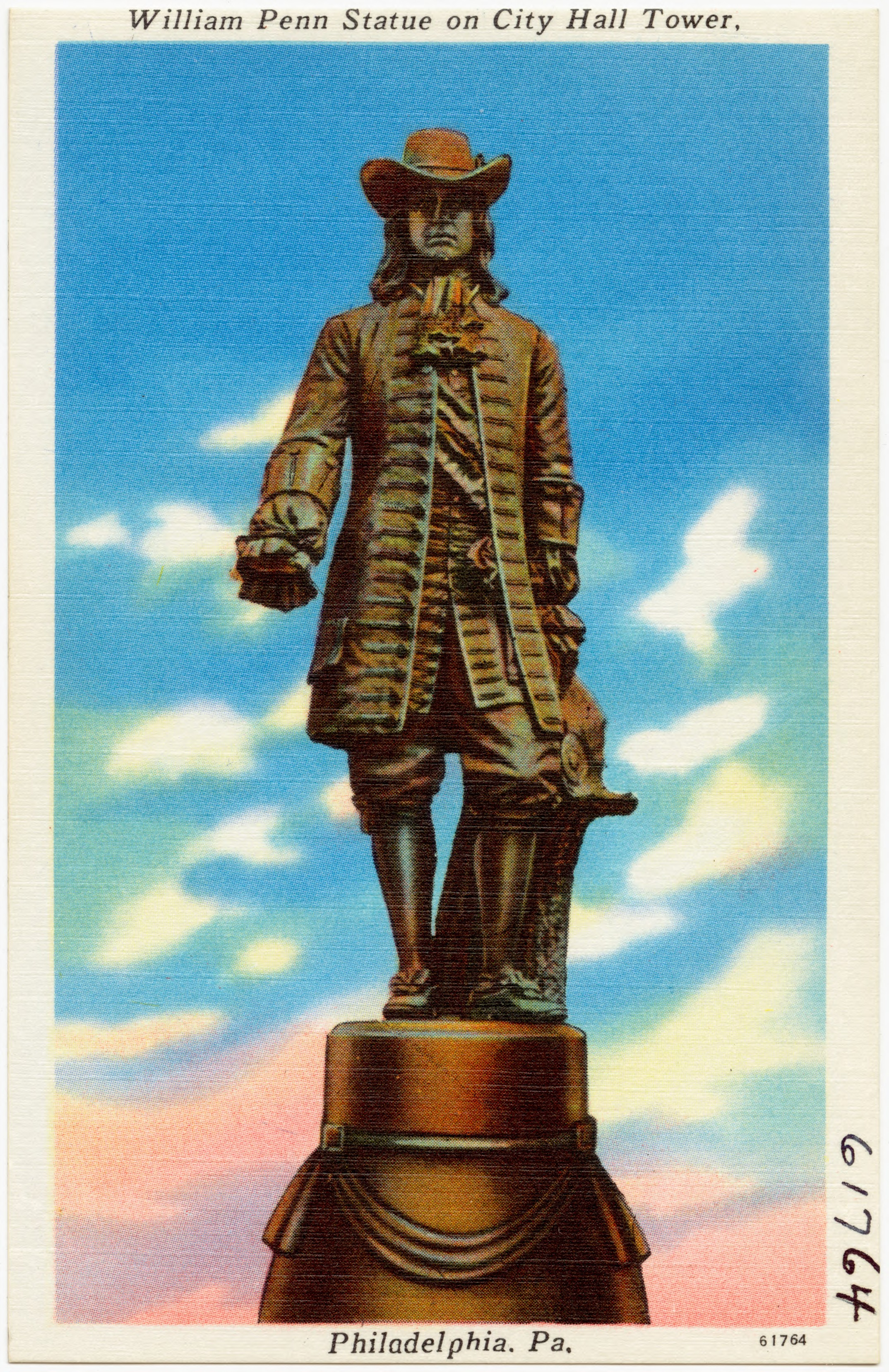
The William Penn statue that sits atop City Hall

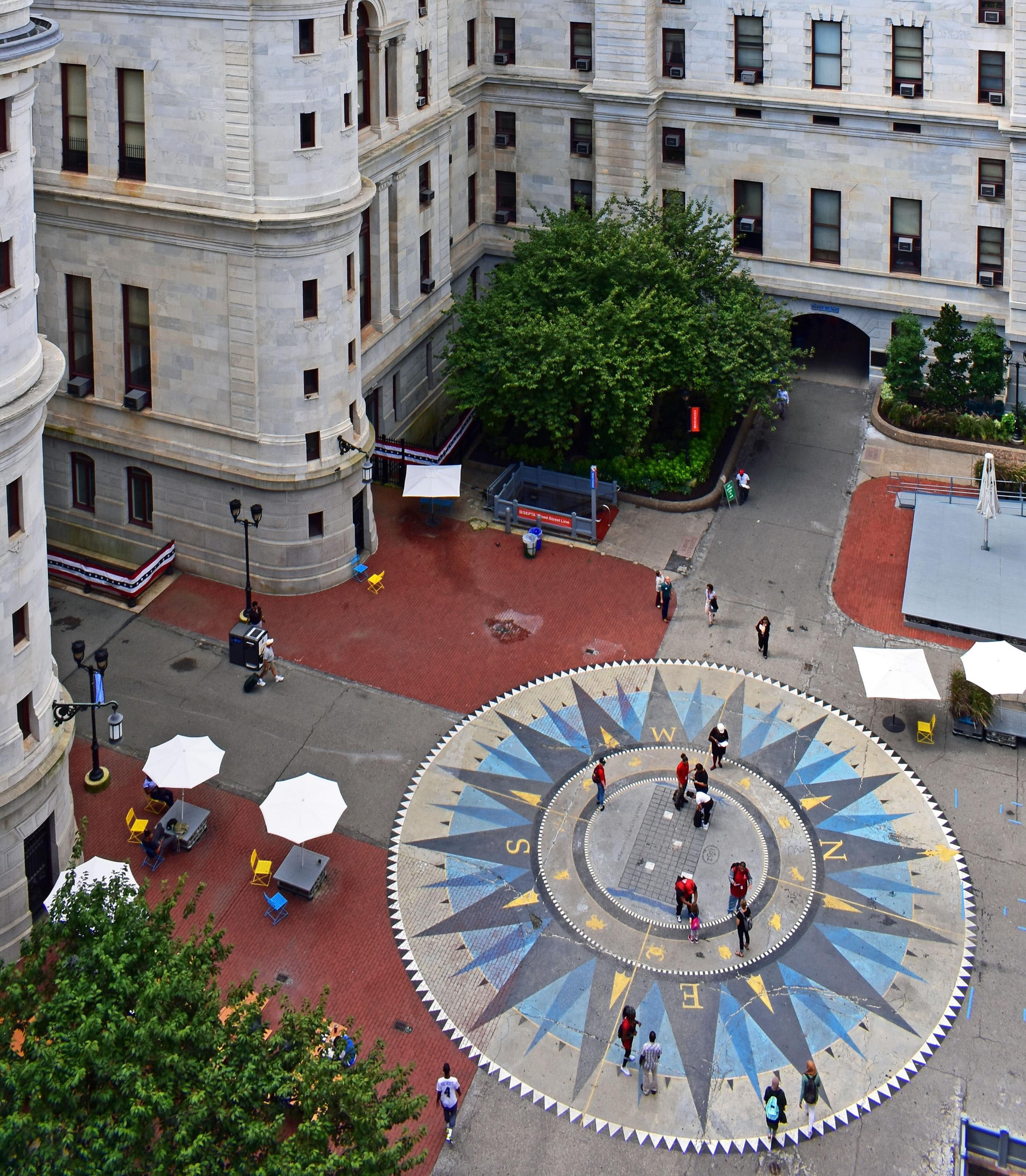
Photo (taken on September 20, 2018) of courtyard of Philadelphia City Hall

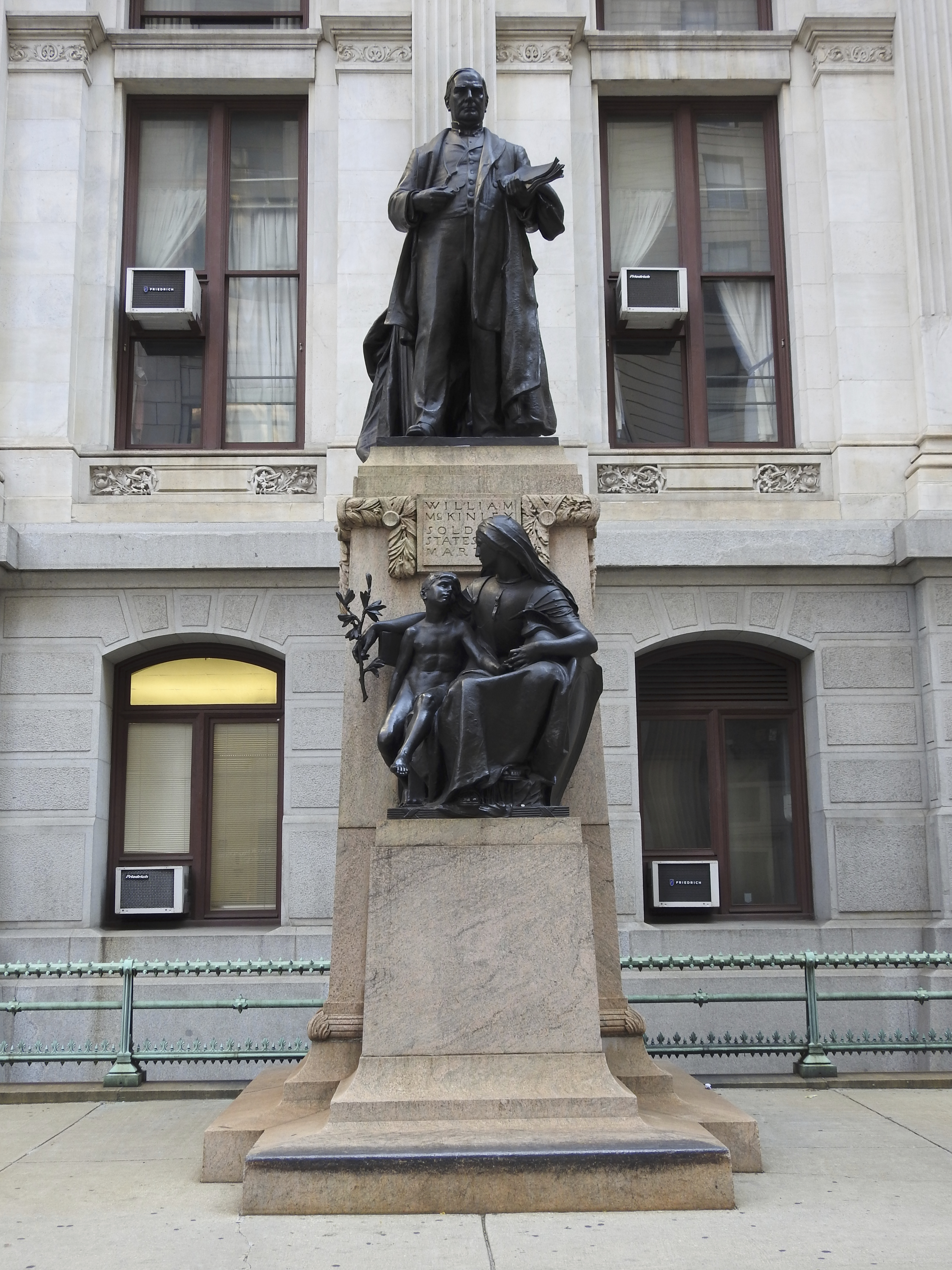
Statue of President McKinley

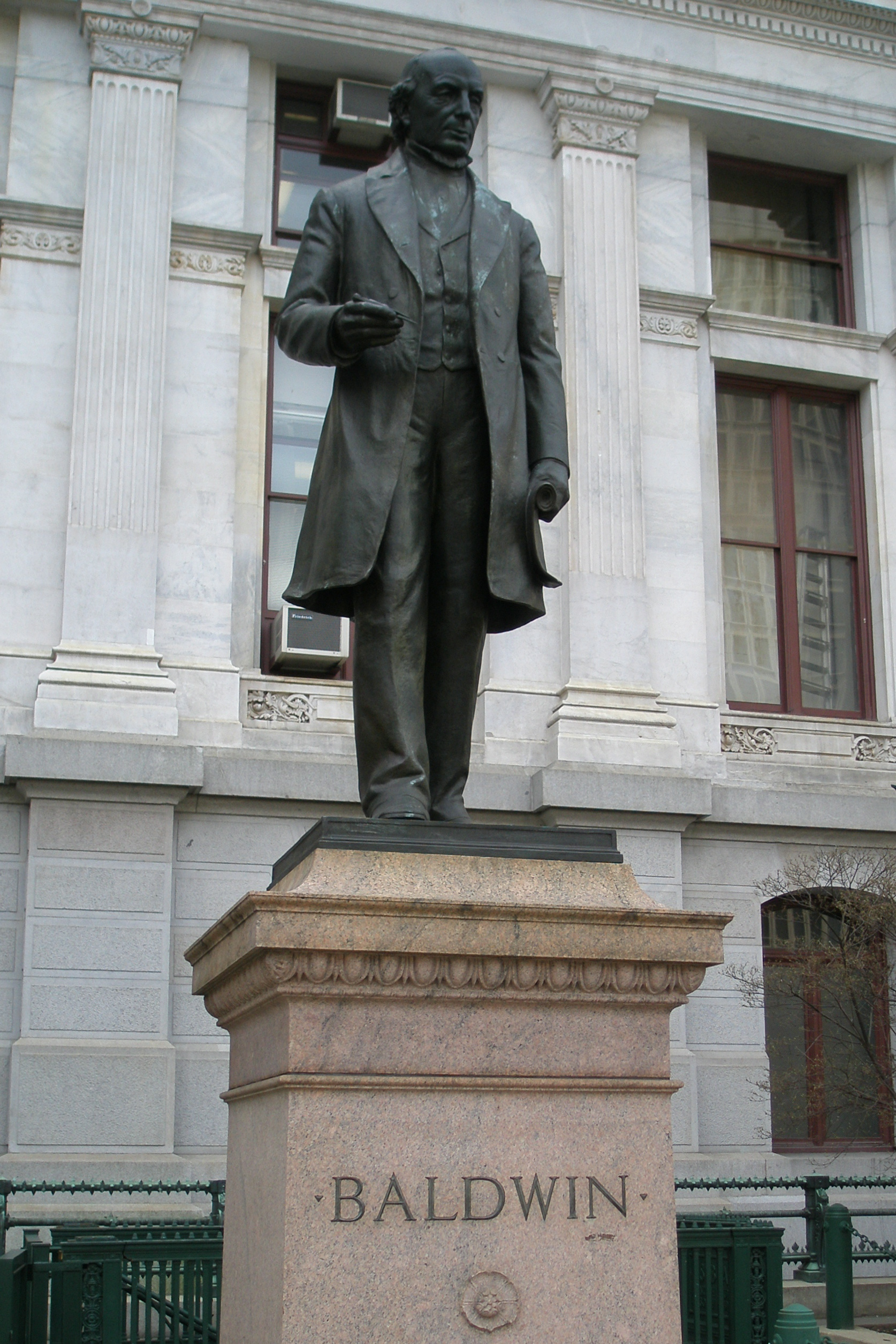
Statue of Matthias W. Baldwin

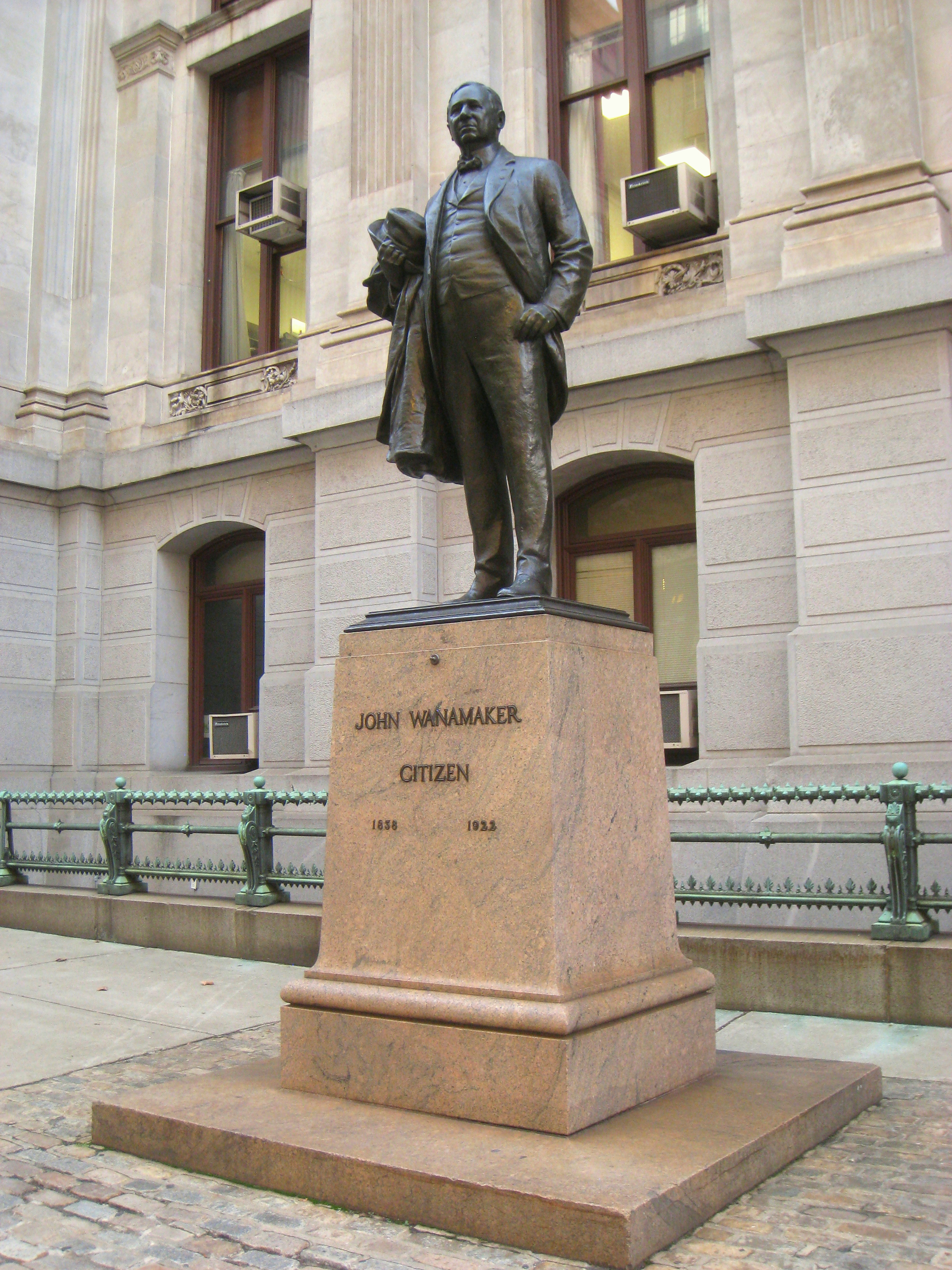
John Wanamaker, statue identified as "Citizen", created by John Massey Rhind

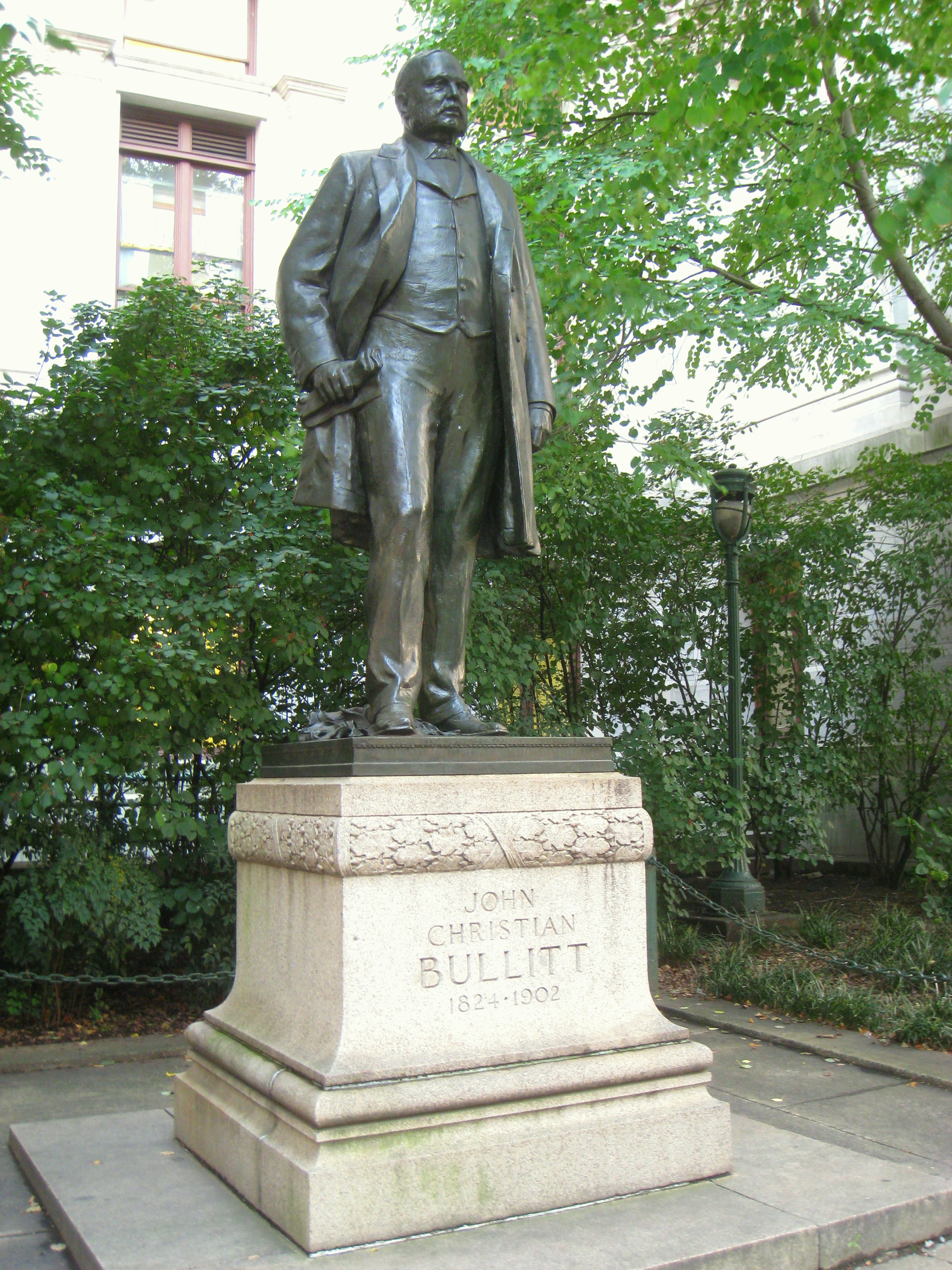
John Christian Bullitt sculpture by John J. Boyle

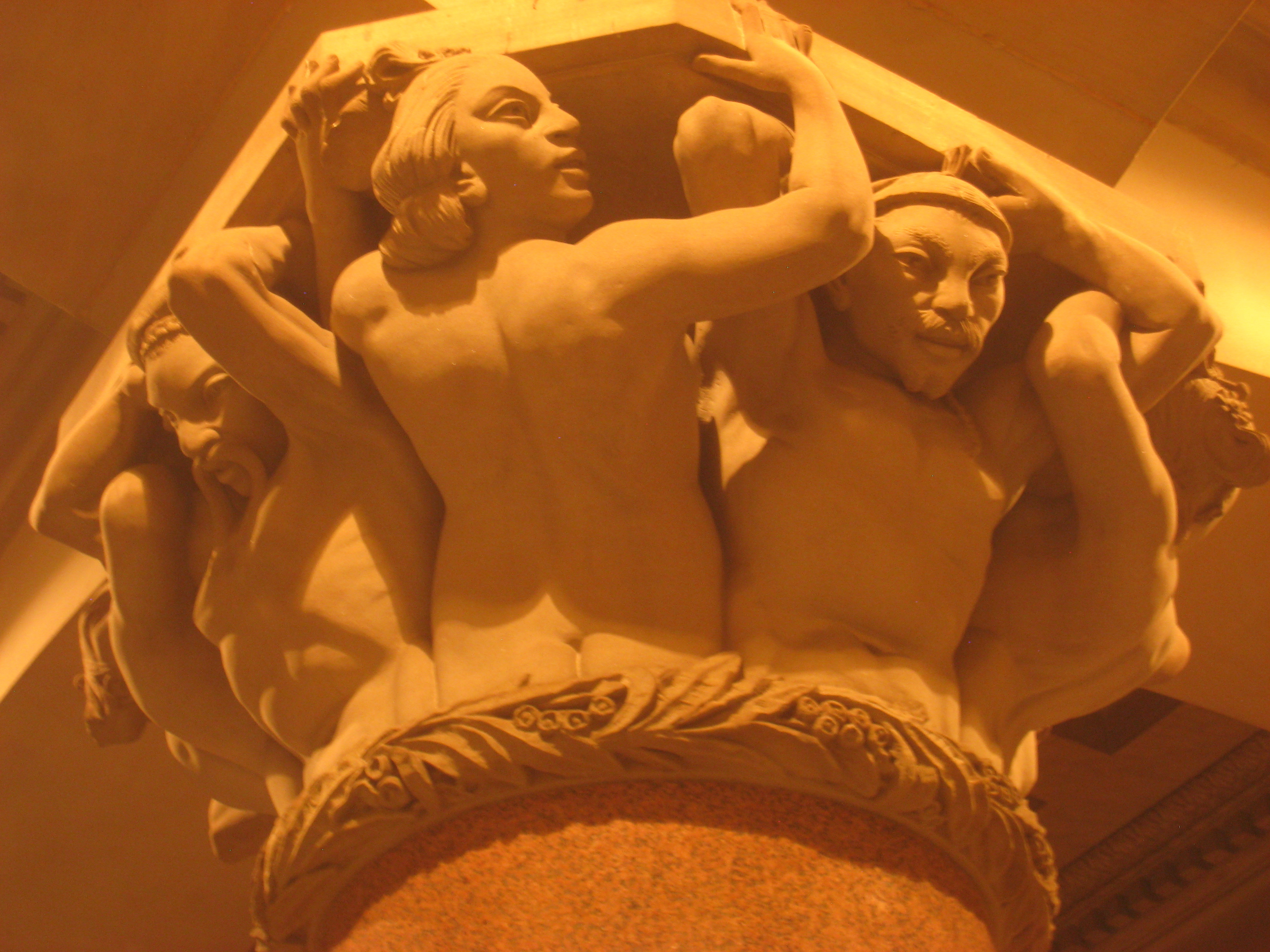
North Pavilion Sculpture created prior to 1893 by Alexander Milne Calder; photograph taken on October 19, 2010.

2011 photo of detail of Alexander Milne Calder sculptures on Philadelphia City Hall

== See also ==
- List of National Historic Landmarks in Philadelphia
- List of state and county courthouses in Pennsylvania
- List of tallest buildings in Pennsylvania
- List of tallest buildings in Philadelphia
- List of tallest clock towers
- List of tallest structures built before the 20th century
- National Register of Historic Places listings in Center City, Philadelphia
- Parliament Building, Quebec City – built at approximately the same time in the same style

== Notes ==
^{I} The Council on Tall Buildings and Urban Habitat (an authority on the official height of tall buildings worldwide) provides the following criteria for defining the completion of a building: "topped out structurally and architecturally, fully-clad, and open for business, or at least partially occupiable." Philadelphia City Hall was occupied by the mayor beginning in 1889 and the Supreme Court of Pennsylvania beginning in 1891, and the building was topped out in 1894. City Hall was the tallest habitable building in the world until 1908 when surpassed by the Singer Building. City Hall was surpassed during its construction by the Washington Monument and the Eiffel Tower, and is slightly lower by about 0.5 m (1 ft 8 in) than the Mole Antonelliana (completed in 1889); however, none of those three structures are considered habitable buildings.

Preceded by Auditorium Theatre; 2015 and 2016	Venues of the NFL draft 2017	Succeeded by AT&T Stadium; 2018

Records
Preceded by New York World Building	Tallest building in the world 1894–1908; 548 ft (167 m)	Succeeded by Singer Building
Preceded by New York World Building	Tallest building in the United States; 1894–1908; 167 m	Succeeded by Singer Building
Preceded by Chicago Board of Trade Building (1885)	Tallest building in the United States outside of New York City; 1894–1924; 167 m	Succeeded by Chicago Temple Building
Preceded by Tenth Presbyterian Church	Tallest building in Pennsylvania; 167 metres (548 ft); 1894–1932	Succeeded by Gulf Tower
Preceded by Tenth Presbyterian Church	Tallest building in Philadelphia; 167 metres (548 ft); 1894–1987	Succeeded by One Liberty Place
