= Comcast Center =

Skyscraper in Philadelphia, Pennsylvania

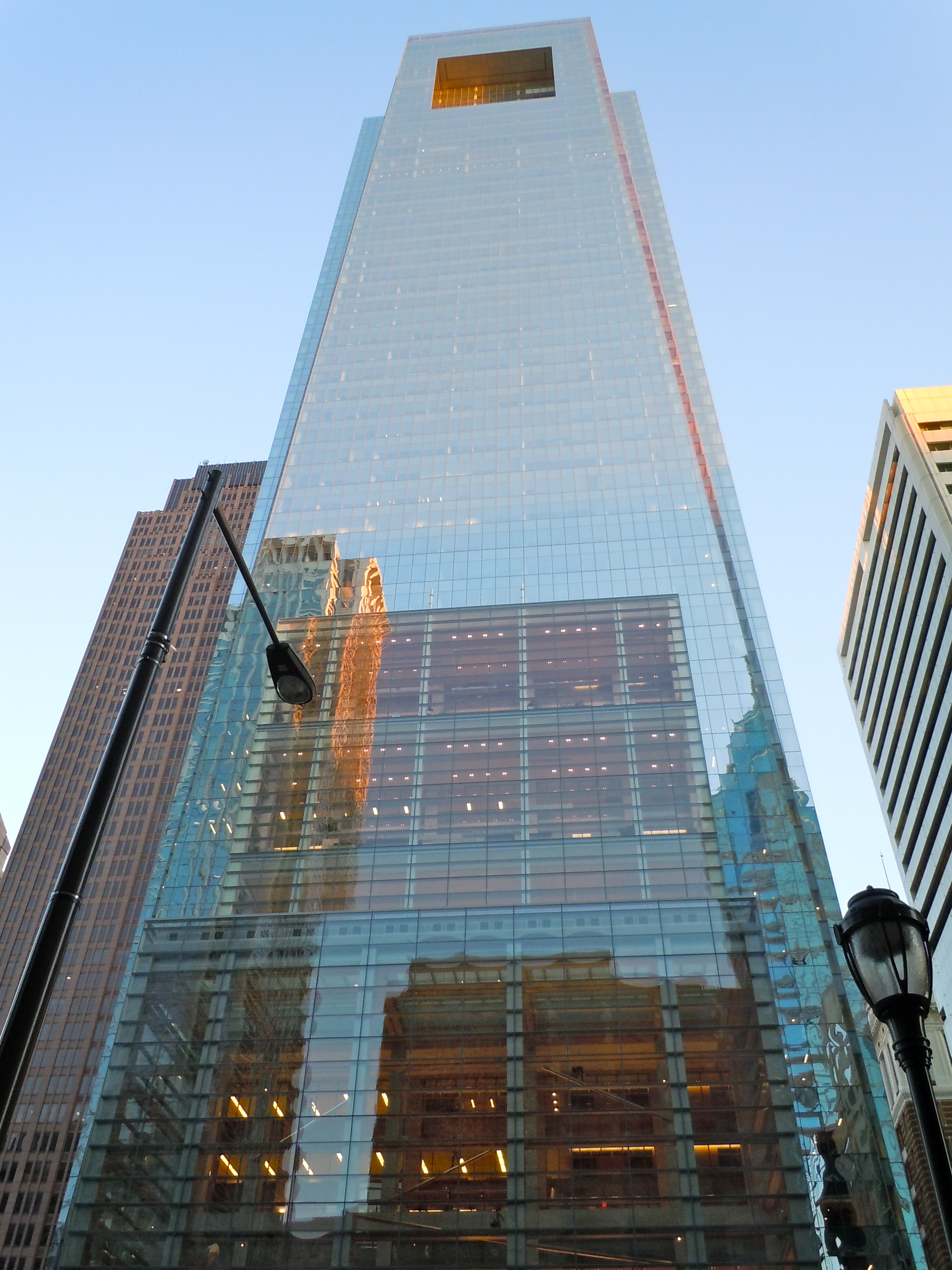
- A view from the bottom of the Comcast Center

- Location within Philadelphia Location within Pennsylvania Location within the United States
- Former names: One Pennsylvania Plaza

Record height
- Tallest in Pennsylvania from 2008 to 2017^{[I]}
- Preceded by: Liberty Place
- Surpassed by: Comcast Technology Center

General information
- Type: Commercial offices
- Location: 1701 John F. Kennedy Blvd. Philadelphia, Pennsylvania 19103; U.S.
- Coordinates: 39.9547°N 75.1683°W
- Construction started: 2005
- Completed: 2008
- Cost: US$540 million
- Owner: Liberty/Commerz 1701 JFK Boulevard L.P.
- Operator: Hill International

Height
- Antenna spire: 973 ft (296.7 m)

Technical details
- Floor count: 58; 3 below ground
- Floor area: 1,399,997 sq ft (130,064.0 m^{2})
- Lifts/elevators: 35

Design and construction
- Architect: Robert A.M. Stern Architects
- Developer: Liberty Property Trust
- Structural engineer: Thornton Tomasetti
- Main contractor: L. F. Driscoll Company

Website
- comcastcentercampus.com

The Comcast Center, also known as the Comcast Tower, is a skyscraper at 1701 John F. Kennedy Boulevard in Center City, Philadelphia. The 58-story, 973-foot (297 m) tower is the second-tallest building in Philadelphia and in the U.S. Commonwealth of Pennsylvania, and the 31st-tallest building in the United States. Originally called One Pennsylvania Plaza when plans for the building were announced in 2001, the Comcast Center went through two redesigns before construction began in 2005. The Comcast Center was designed by Robert A.M. Stern Architects for Liberty Property Trust.

A view of the Comcast Center and greater Fairmount skyline, August 2025

In early 2005, the final redesign and its new name—the Comcast Center—were unveiled. The building is named after its lead tenant, cable company Comcast, which makes the skyscraper and the nearby Comcast Technology Center its corporate headquarters and collectively calls the two buildings its Comcast Center Campus. Leasing 1,094,212 square feet (101,656 m^{2}), Comcast takes up 89 percent of the building. The building features retail and restaurant space and a connection to Suburban Station which is nearby. In the Comcast Center's lobby is the Comcast Experience, which is a 2,000-square-foot (190 m^{2}) high-definition LED screen that has become a tourist attraction. Designed to be environmentally friendly, the skyscraper is the tallest Leadership in Energy and Environmental Design (LEED) certified building in Philadelphia.

== History ==
=== Planning (1999–2004) ===
In 1999, class-A office vacancy in the city was at 6.6%, leading developer Willard Rouse to envision a new tower. Eventually the developer settled on the location where he constructed this building, a 2-acre (8,100 m^{2}), $288 per square-foot parcel owned by Equitable Life Assurance Co. In 2000, the architect and Driehaus Prize winner Robert A. M. Stern began working on a design for a skyscraper being planned by Liberty Property Trust in Philadelphia. In 2001, Liberty Property Trust announced its plan to build the 52-story One Pennsylvania Plaza in Center City. Anticipated US$400 million, One Pennsylvania Plaza was to be 750 ft (230 m) and made of kasota stone similar to the Philadelphia Museum of Art. The site for the future skyscraper was situated at 17th Street and John F. Kennedy Boulevard, a site occupied by a building that housed the Defender Association of Philadelphia and a parking lot. Demolition of the building began in 2002 and ended in 2003.

Cable company Comcast had been looking for possible new headquarters space in anticipation of the end of its lease in Centre Square in 2006. Comcast was looking for more than 400,000 square feet (37,000 m^{2}) of office space and developers were actively courting the company for their developments. Comcast was the only employer in the city with major expansion plans at the time. Comcast was considering staying in Centre Square, while also contemplating moving their headquarters to the new Cira Centre building or One Pennsylvania Plaza. Comcast was spread out over 10 floors in two buildings at Centre Square and wanted space on contiguous floors. In January 2004, Liberty Property Trust unveiled a redesign for the building. The redesign turned One Pennsylvania Plaza into a 60-story, 962 feet (293 m) tower, making it the tallest building in the city at the time. In the redesign, the kasota stone was changed to a lighter granite and a short pyramidal roof was added. The redesign was a result of discussions that had begun in 2003 with Comcast about moving into the tower.

On January 3, 2004, Liberty Property Trust signed a 15½-year lease with Comcast and a construction contract with L.F. Driscoll Co. Liberty Property Trust also unveiled another redesign of the building and its new name, the Comcast Center. The now 975-foot (297 m), 58-story Comcast Center would no longer have a pyramid top and would have a complete glass facade. The architectural model was created by Richard Tenguerian.

==== Controversy ====
Liberty Property Trust hoped to get the One Pennsylvania Plaza site designated a Keystone Opportunity Improvement Zone (KOZ). KOZ designation was intended to encourage development in poor, blighted areas by exempting the tenants of the building from all state and local taxes. Designating One Pennsylvania Plaza a KOZ was supported by then Pennsylvania Governor Ed Rendell, who said it was important to keep corporations within the city. At the time, many of Philadelphia's big employers' leases, including Comcast's, were due to expire, and the employers were considering the possibility of moving out of the city and state. Rendell also said allowing Comcast to enlarge its headquarters by moving into One Pennsylvania Plaza could attract other corporate headquarters to the city. However, other Center City building owners, including Comcast's landlord at Centre Square, HRPT Properties Trust, were opposed to the plan. They said giving the tower the KOZ designation would give it an unfair advantage because Liberty Property Trust could charge above-market rents since the tax breaks would offset the cost for tenants. The group believed tenants attracted to One Pennsylvania Plaza because of the tax breaks would cause more vacancies in other Center City skyscrapers, rather than attracting more business to blighted areas as intended under the law. In early 2004, Center City had a vacancy rate of 12.8%.

Both sides of the issue hired law firms, lobbyists, and business associates to promote their positions to city and state officials. A report by the Center City District said if both One Pennsylvania Plaza and the Cira Centre, another skyscraper in the KOZ controversy, were filled by corporations moving from other Center City office towers, the city could lose US$153 million by 2018. A report released by the group of building owners opposed to KOZ says the two buildings could cost the city almost US$91 million a year. In contrast, a report issued by a consulting company hired by Liberty Property Trust said that a KOZ designation for the skyscraper could generate US$27 million for the city. Critics of the KOZ designation also claimed that close relationships between Liberty Property Trust and Comcast and the Rendell administration were inappropriately influencing the governor's position on the issue. When Rendell was mayor of Philadelphia, David L. Cohen, a Comcast executive vice president, was Rendell's chief of staff, and William P. Hankowsky, Liberty Property Trust's chief executive, was director of Philadelphia's development agency. Rendell dismissed the claims, saying "Every building owner in town was a contributor to me."

Chances the bill would be passed ended in November 2004 when House Republicans in the Pennsylvania General Assembly decided not to bring the bill to a vote. Later that year, Governor Rendell released US$30 million from the Redevelopment Assistance Budget to Liberty Property Trust. Through the state's Department of Economic and Community Development, Comcast received US$12.75 million that included a US$4-million opportunity grant, US$6.75 million in job-creation tax credits, and US$2 million in job training assistance. Despite the failure to gain KOZ status, the project received US$42.75 million in financial incentives from the state.

=== Construction (2005–2008) ===
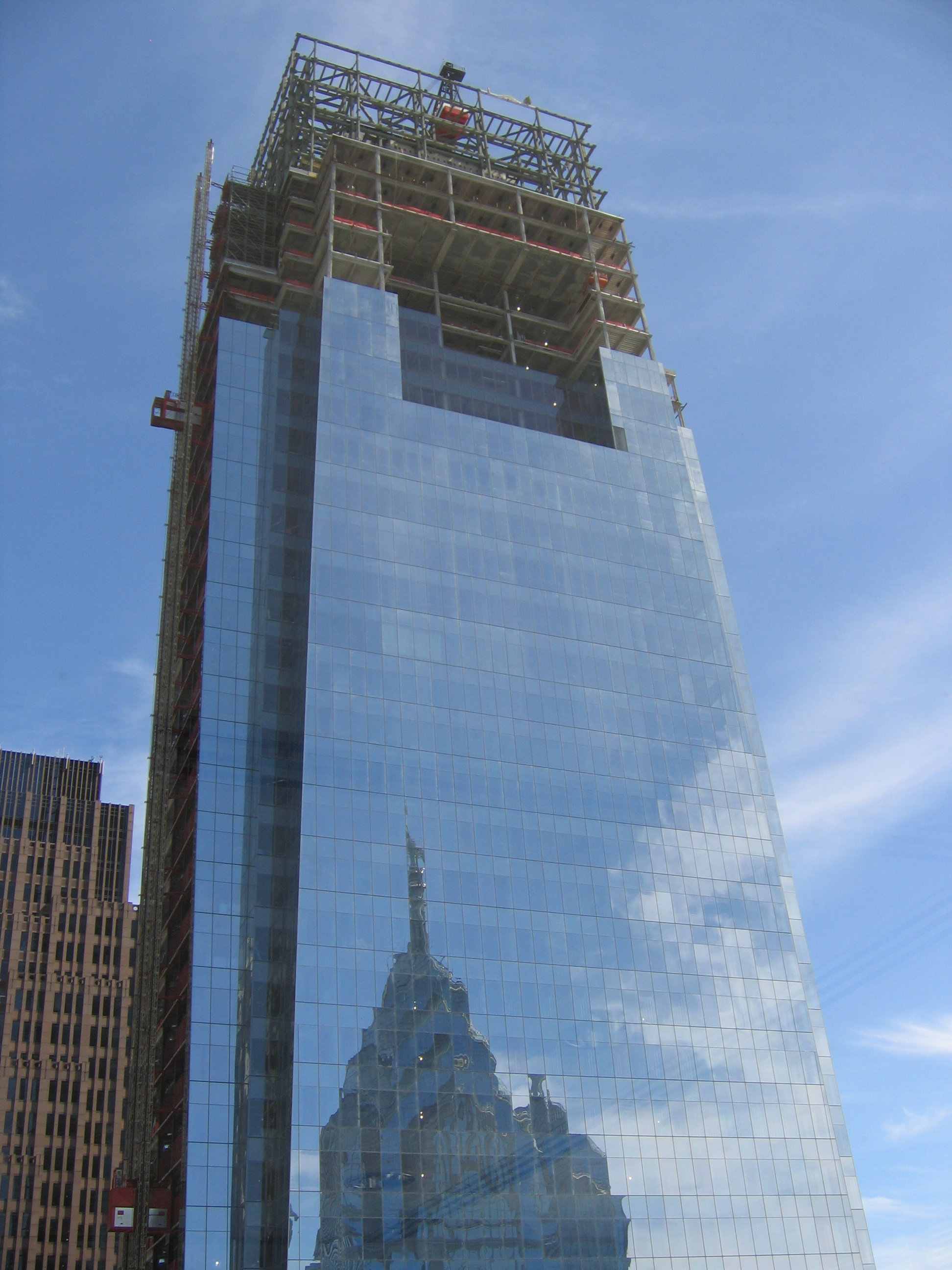
The Comcast Center under construction, 2007

The official groundbreaking ceremony was on March 31, 2005. The ceremony, which was held at night, featured a light show coordinated with a piece of music entitled "Elevation". The song was composed specifically for the event by Curtis Institute of Music graduate Steven Hackman and recorded by the Curtis Institute of Music Orchestra. The groundbreaking also featured Kodo, the Germantown High School drumline, and a 6-foot-tall (1.8 m) ice sculpture of the Comcast Center.

While under construction, in March 2006, Liberty Property Trust negotiated with Philadelphia's Plumbers Union Local 690, which had issues with the building's waterless urinals. The waterless urinals were part of the plan to make the Comcast Center an environmentally friendly building because they would save an extra 1.6 million US gallons (6,100 m^{3}) of water a year. The plumbers union opposed the waterless urinals, claiming they were unsanitary and would provide less work for the plumbers. Philadelphia's Plumbing Advisory Board approved the waterless urinals on April 5 after a compromise, which stated that the building's owners and city officials would monitor the performance of the waterless urinals, was reached. Piping that would allow water to flow to the urinals in case they needed to be converted was installed in the Comcast Center, which Liberty Property Trust says was always part of the building's plan.

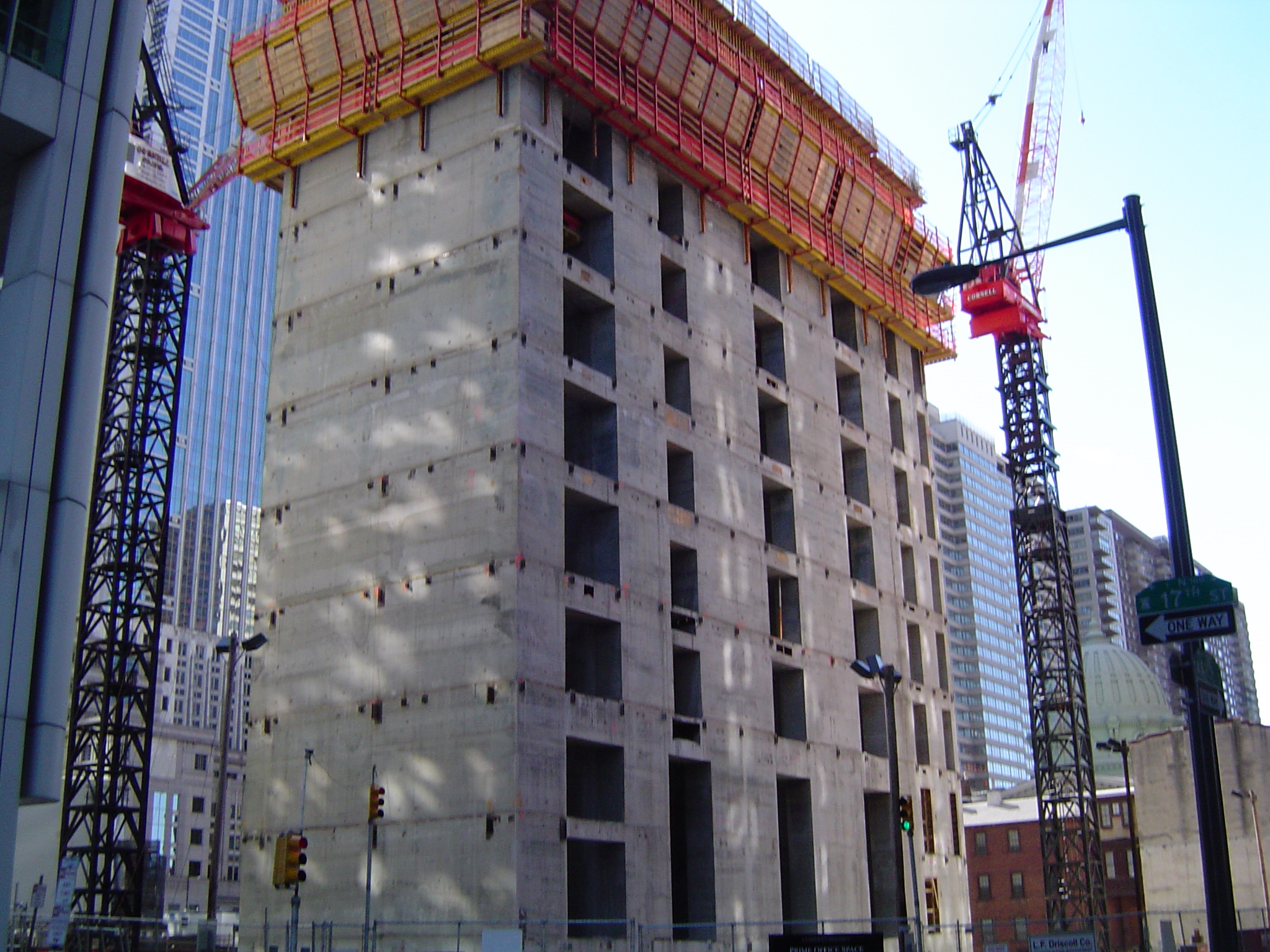
The Comcast Center's concrete core

A week later, on April 13, Liberty Property Trust sold an 80-percent interest in the Comcast Center to German real estate firm CommerzLeasing & Immobilien AG, a subsidiary of Commerzbank AG. The deal completed Liberty Property Trust's planned recapitalization of the anticipated cost of the building, and the value of the joint venture, called Liberty/Commerz 1701 JFK Boulevard L.P., included mortgage debt and equity.

On June 18, 2007, the Comcast Center was topped out. The ceremony, which was held in the building's future plaza, featured the raising of a steel beam to the skyscraper's highest point. The beam was signed by workers and guests and as it was raised, on account of tradition, an American flag and a tree sat on the beam. Also sitting on the beam was a statue of Philadelphia-founder William Penn. The statue was there to counteract the 1980s "curse" of Billy Penn, which supposedly prevented Philadelphia's sports teams from winning a championship following the construction of buildings taller than the statue of William Penn on top of the 548-foot (167 m) Philadelphia City Hall. The 25-inch (64 cm) statue of William Penn remained on the beam until it was stolen. The statue was replaced and the "curse" ended when the Philadelphia Phillies won the 2008 World Series.

The Comcast Center officially opened on June 6, 2008. A study sponsored by Comcast and Liberty Property Trust said the construction of the Comcast Center created 17,200 jobs and generated US$2 billion of economic activity for Pennsylvania. Despite opposition by other building owners to construction of the Comcast Center, by the time most space in the Comcast Center had been leased vacancy rates in Center City offices were falling and rents were rising. HRPT Properties Trust had leased 70 percent of the space Comcast had vacated by 2007. The predictions by opponents did not occur mainly because Comcast ended up leasing 89 percent of the building and the offices for the Comcast Center's second-largest tenant, Citizens Bank of Pennsylvania, were new to the city.

== Building ==
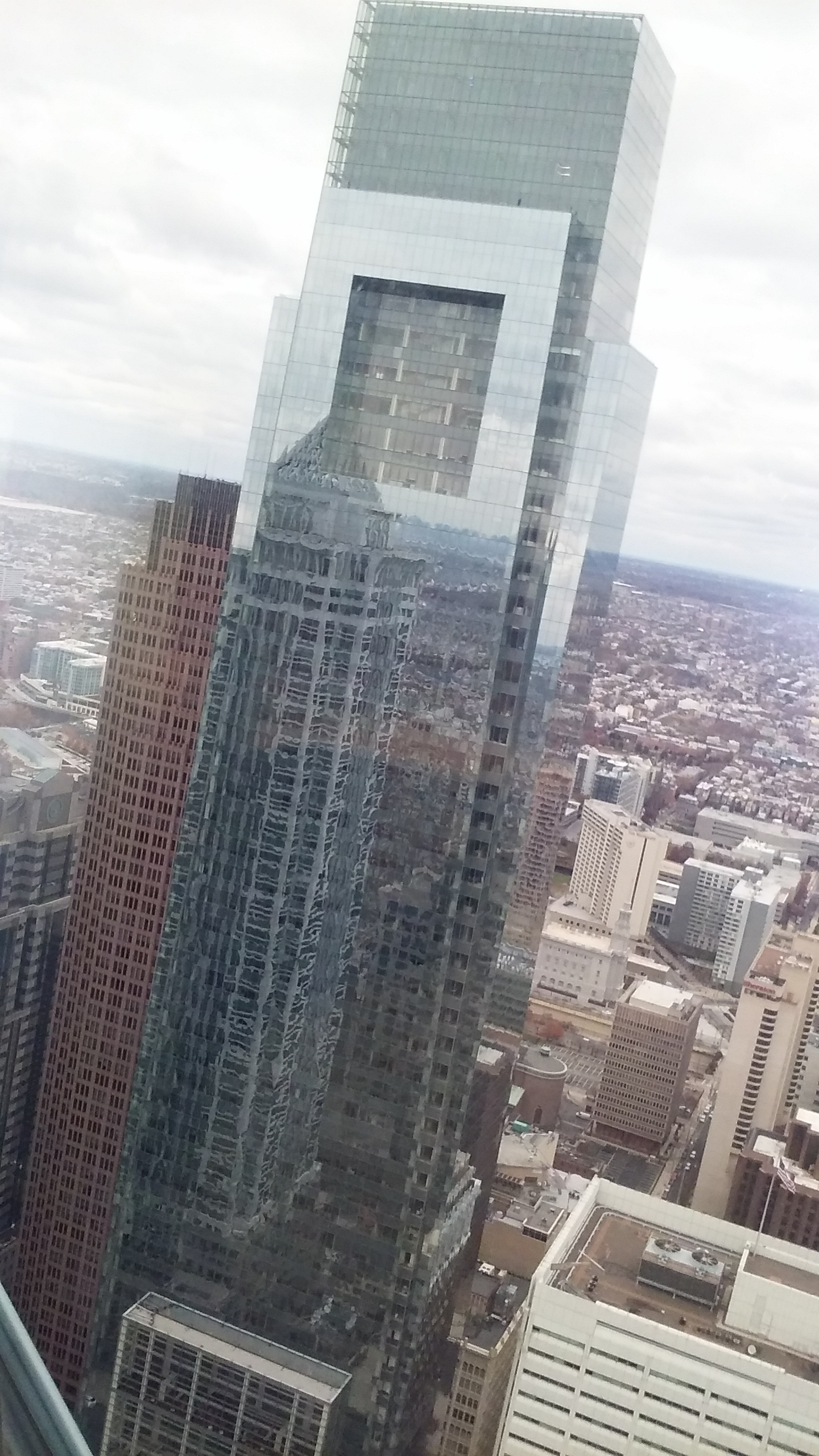
The Comcast Center as seen from One Liberty Observation Deck

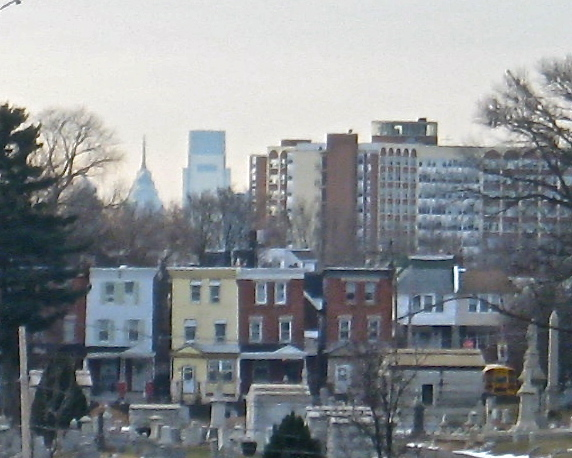
The Comcast Center can be viewed from some Philadelphia suburbs, such as this view from Cheltenham Township.

The Comcast Center has 58 floors, 56 of which are usable. The structure of the Comcast Center comprises a central concrete core with steel-framed floors.

=== Form and facade ===
The building's exterior features a glass curtain wall made of lightly tinted, non-reflective low-emissivity glass. The tower tapers inward towards the top and features two cutouts near the top of the building on the north and south sides.

The Comcast Center faces a half-acre public plaza. The plaza, designed by Lucinda Sanders of OLIN, sits over underground railroad tracks. It features a seasonal outdoor restaurant, Cafe Click, that is sheltered by a trellis. Between the cafe and the building entrance is a choreographed fountain designed by Wet. The tower's entrance is a 110-foot (34 m) tall winter garden. The winter garden entrance directly connects to the underground concourse of Suburban Station. The building also has a lobby entrance that leads to the Arch Street Presbyterian Church adjacent to the tower.

The exterior lighting scheme of the building was designed by Quentin Thomas Associates, and consists primarily of white LEDs color-temperature matched to the fluorescent lights used by the interior. Along each floor, the corner spandrel panels feature upward and downward-facing 4,100K LEDs to create the appearance that the length of the building has been bottom-lit by spotlights. The only major consistently active color element can be found at the top of the tuned mass damper; a single row of color-changing LEDs that is programmed to commemorate special events. For example, the top would be colored pink for Breast Cancer Awareness Month.

=== Mechanical features ===
To prevent the tower from swaying too much in the wind, the Comcast Center contains a 300,000-US-gallon (1,100 m^{3}) double-chambered concrete tuned liquid column damper, the largest such damper in North America. Receiving a gold Leadership in Energy and Environmental Design (LEED) rating in April 2009, the Comcast Center is the tallest LEED building in Philadelphia. The building was designed to use 40 percent less water than a typical office building, and the plaza was designed to reduce heat-island effect from the pavement by 70 percent. Reducing air conditioning and lighting costs, the low-emissivity glass curtain wall blocks 60 percent of heat while allowing 70 percent of the Sun's light inside.

=== Interior ===
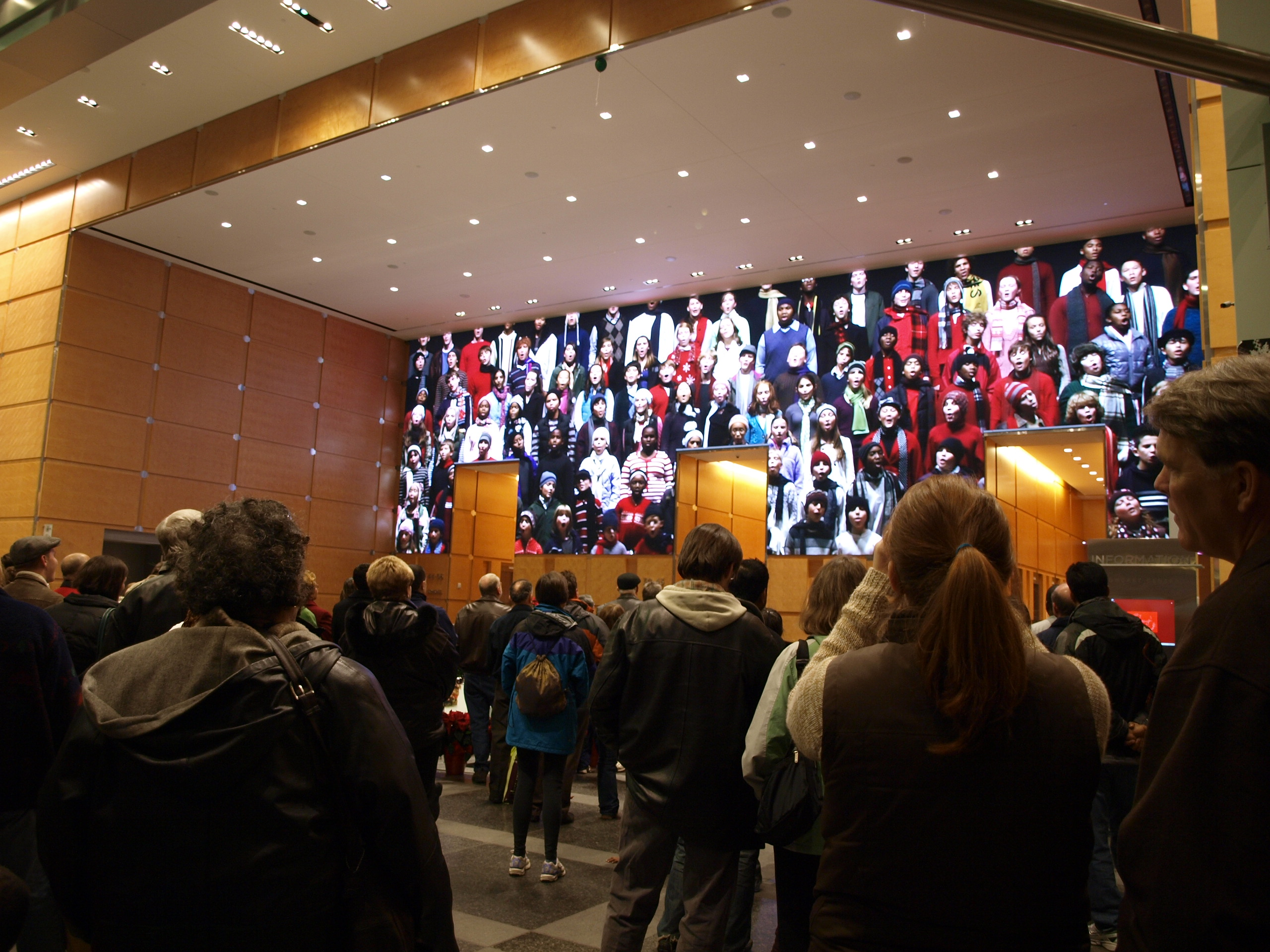
People watching the Comcast Experience holiday show in 2008

The skyscraper has 1,238,000 square feet (115,000 m^{2}) of rentable space, including 36,000 square feet (3,300 m^{2}) of restaurant and retail space called The Market at the Comcast Center. 16,500 square feet (1,500 m^{2}) of retail space is on the underground concourse while the rest is located on the street level. The building features high ceilings with some floors having a ceiling height of 13 feet (4 m). The lower floors on the south side of the building feature four three-story stacked atrias. The building also features a 500-seat concourse level dining court and an 87-space private underground parking garage. ThyssenKrupp provided the building's 30 gearless elevators, seven hydraulic elevators, and two escalators. The Comcast Center's winter garden entrance contains two works of installation art: the Comcast Experience display and Humanity in Motion.

==== Comcast Experience LED animation display ====
The Comcast Experience is a 25-foot (7.6 m) tall, 83-foot (25 m) wide, 2,000-square-foot (190 m^{2}) high-definition LED screen situated on a wall in the winter garden. The screen is composed of 7.8 million, 4.66mm pitch pixels housed in 6,771 LED modules of the type used in the Barco NX-4 panel. The installation, designed and produced by Niles Creative Group, premiered on June 6, 2008, and runs eighteen hours each day. The content of the video includes panoramic views of Philadelphia historic sites, images of space, dancers, acrobats and actors moving around a background designed to mimic wood paneling of the walls of the lobby. Another part of the installation displays images of cranes and machinery forming the design of a clock that tells the correct time of day.

The Comcast Experience quickly became a popular tourist attraction, prompting city officials to add the Comcast Center to its tourism website. Between Thanksgiving 2008 and New Year's Day 2009, a holiday video was included as part of the installation.

==== Humanity in Motion statuary ====
The second piece of art is Jonathan Borofsky's Humanity in Motion. Located in the glass atrium of the winter garden, Humanity in Motion shows ten life-size human figures walking across ten horizontal poles positioned at different levels of the atrium. At ground level, looking up at the stainless steel figures, are two more figures shaped to look like a father and son.

== Tenants ==
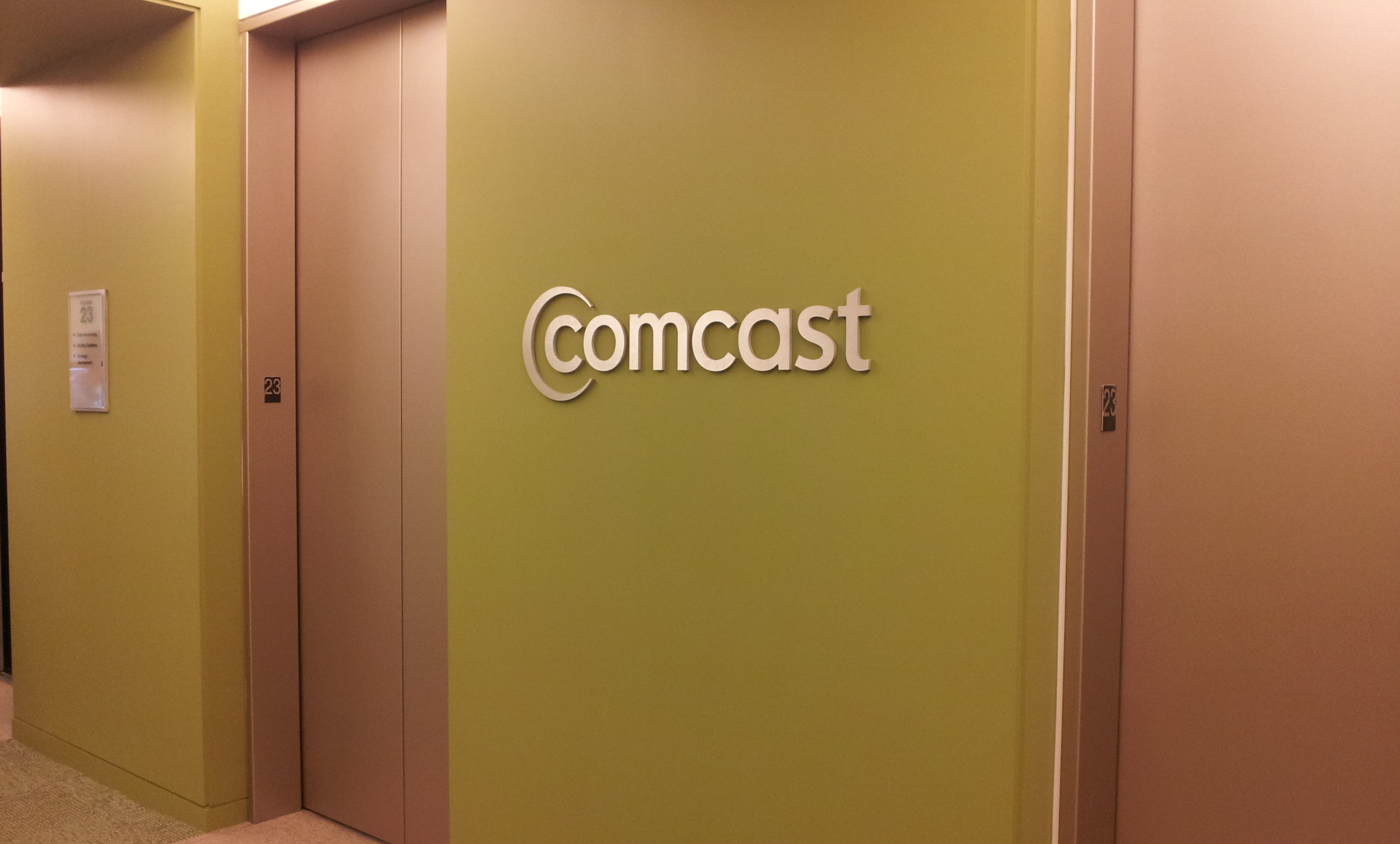
Comcast is the building's namesake and also the largest tenant.

Comcast is the skyscraper's largest tenant, leasing 1,094,212 square feet (101,656 m^{2}), or 89 percent of the building. The second-largest tenant is Citizens Bank of Pennsylvania, which leases 56,000 square feet (5,200 m^{2}) of office and retail space. Other tenants include the Judge Group, a staffing agency, which leases 6,427 square feet (600 m^{2}).

Comcast's office space was designed by Daroff Design + DDI Architects and Gensler. Comcast's space is topped by a conference room floor with the executive offices on the four floors below it. Below that are more offices and then, on the 43rd and 44th floors, is Ralph's Cafe, a two-story cafeteria space named after the company founder Ralph J. Roberts. Below the cafe is the training center called "Comcast University". The rest of the space is used for content and programing teams, customer service, Technology & Product teams, Finance and Legal. The interior design of the offices are designed with a variety of shape and color ranging from the open white space of the upper offices to the colorful walls of the training center. Other designs include a glass and stainless steel staircase that wraps around a four-story column of flat-screen monitors and connects the executive floors.

The retail portion of the tower includes numerous shops and eateries. The shops and eateries include national and regional chains, and initially featured a restaurant called Table 31. Table 31, which had a cafe on the plaza and a restaurant spread over three floors in the tower, was owned by Philadelphia restaurateurs and chefs Georges Perrier and Chris Scarduzio. The restaurant was named after a popular table at the former Perrier and Scarduzio establishment Brasserie Perrier. Table 31 closed in 2013, amid a dispute among its owners, and was replaced by another upscale steakhouse, named "Chops".

== Reception ==
Philadelphia Inquirer architecture critic Inga Saffron described the Comcast Center as "a respectable work of architecture" that was "dignified in its stance on the grid, generous in its relationship to the city, responsible in its treatment of the environment". She felt the tower's shape reminded her of a giant flash drive. Saffron said the building excelled at the street level, praising the plaza, concourse, and its connection to Suburban Station. In 2009, the Comcast Center was awarded the Urban Land Institute Award for Excellence in the Americas category for the transformation of what was once mostly a vacant lot into a transit gateway.

== See also ==
- List of tallest buildings in Philadelphia
- Comcast Technology Center

Records
Preceded by One Liberty Place	Tallest building in Pennsylvania; 297 metres (974 ft); 2008-2018	Succeeded by Comcast Technology Center
Preceded by One Liberty Place	Tallest building in Philadelphia; 297 metres (974 ft); 2008-2018	Succeeded by Comcast Technology Center
