= Liberty Place =

Skyscraper complex in Philadelphia, Pennsylvania

Coordinates: 39.9522°N 75.1678°W

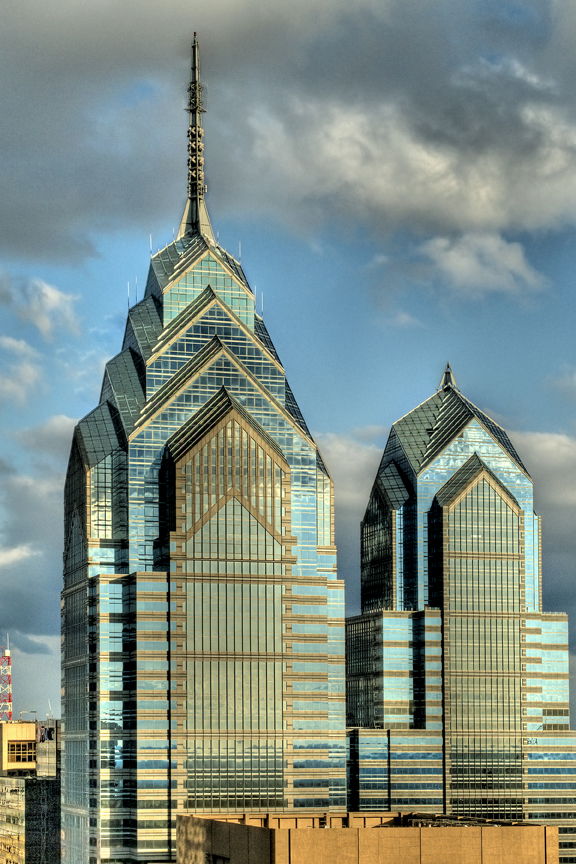
- One and Two Liberty Place in Center City Philadelphia

- Location within Philadelphia Location within Pennsylvania Location within the United States

Record height
- Tallest in Pennsylvania from 1987 to 2008^{[I]}
- Preceded by: U.S. Steel Tower
- Surpassed by: Comcast Center

General information
- Status: Completed
- Type: Mixed-use
- Location: Philadelphia, Pennsylvania, U.S.
- Groundbreaking: Phase 1: May 13, 1985; Phase 2: February 16, 1988
- Completed: Phase 1: 1987; Phase 2: 1990
- Owner: Sunbelt Management; Coretrust Capital Partners; HEI Hospitality; Falcone Group

Height
- Architectural: 945 feet (288 m) / 848 feet (258 m)
- Top floor: Phase 1: 784 feet (239 m)

Technical details
- Floor count: 61 / 58
- Floor area: 111,483 square metres (1,199,990 sq ft)
- Lifts/elevators: Phase 2: 24

Design and construction
- Architect: Helmut Jahn
- Architecture firm: Murphy/Jahn
- Developer: Rouse & Associates
- Structural engineer: Thornton Tomasetti

Website
- onelibertyplace.com

Liberty Place is a skyscraper complex in Philadelphia, Pennsylvania, United States. The complex is composed of a 61-story, 945-foot (288 m) skyscraper called One Liberty Place, a 58-story, 848-foot (258 m) skyscraper called Two Liberty Place, a two-story shopping mall called the Shops at Liberty Place, and the 14-story Westin Philadelphia Hotel.

Prior to the construction of Liberty Place, there was a gentlemen's agreement not to build any structure in Center City higher than the statue of William Penn on top of Philadelphia City Hall. The tradition lasted until 1984 when developer Willard G. Rouse III of Rouse & Associates announced plans to build an office building complex that included two towers taller than City Hall. There was a great amount of opposition to the construction of the towers with critics believing breaking the height limit would lead to construction of many more tall skyscrapers, ruining the livability and charm of Center City. Despite the opposition, construction of One Liberty Place was approved and the first phase of the project began in 1985 and was completed in 1987. The distinctive design and spire make the complex a recognizable part of the Philadelphia skyline.

Phase 2 of the project included Two Liberty Place, a hotel, a shopping mall, and a parking garage. Construction began 1988, after Cigna agreed to lease the entirety of the skyscraper for use as that company's world headquarters. Construction was completed in 1990, making Two Liberty Place the second-tallest building in the city. The two towers held their place as first- and second-tallest buildings in Philadelphia until the Comcast Center was topped off in 2007, which was surpassed in 2017 by the Comcast Technology Center. Liberty Place was received enthusiastically by critics and led to the construction of other tall skyscrapers giving Philadelphia what architecture critic Paul Goldberger called "one of the most appealing skylines of any major American city".

Liberty Place was designed by architect Helmut Jahn and his firm Murphy/Jahn. The steel and blue glass skyscrapers were heavily influenced by New York City's Chrysler Building. The major influence is the spire made of gabled angular setbacks. Two Liberty Place's spire is shorter and squatter, a design influenced by the needs of tenant Cigna. In the 2000s, Cigna reduced its presence in the tower, which led to the owners converting the upper floors into 122 luxury condominiums. Below the two towers is the 289 room Westin hotel and the 143,000 square feet (13,000 m^{2}) Shops at Liberty Place. The main feature of the mall is a round atrium topped by a large glass dome.

== History ==
=== Planning and controversy ===
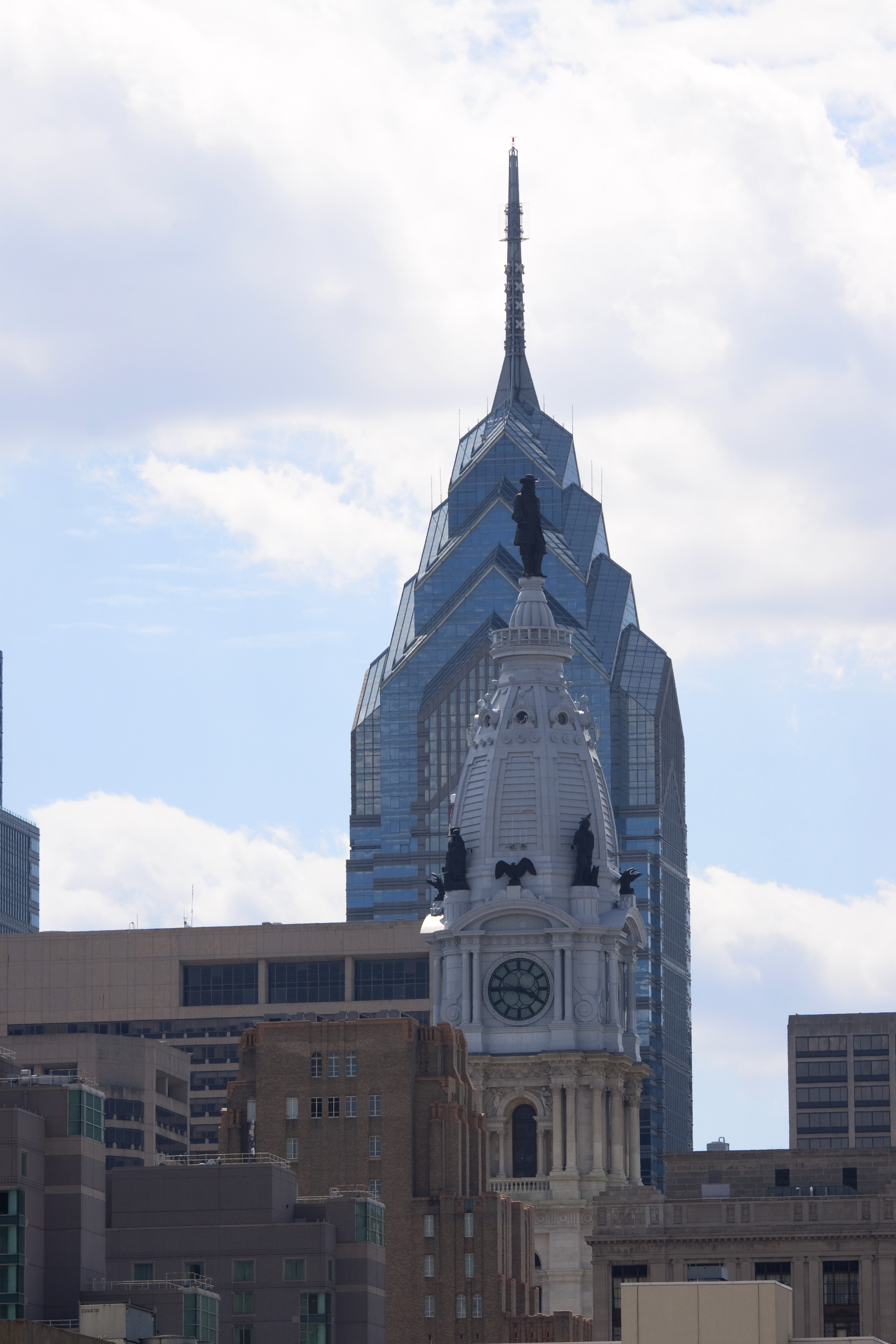
One Liberty Place (background) looms over City Hall (foreground), representing what many Philadelphia sports fans alleged was the Curse of Billy Penn. The curse finally lifted with the Philadelphia Phillies victory in the 2008 World Series.

In Philadelphia, Pennsylvania, a gentlemen's agreement informally prevented the construction of buildings in Center City that were higher than the statue of William Penn atop Philadelphia City Hall. The tradition lasted until the 1980s when developer Willard G. Rouse III of Rouse & Associates announced plans to build an office building complex that included two towers taller than City Hall. Prior to any development plans, Rouse wanted to acquire prime real estate in Philadelphia and he eyed a block in Center City occupied by parking lots and several small buildings. The Oliver Tyrone Pulver Corp. also eyed the land for development and the company and Rouse both vied for the block of land by buying small lots throughout the site. Neither developer was able to acquire enough contiguous space to build a large office building, so after a lawsuit and failed negotiations, the two developers agreed to an organized bidding war for each other's properties. Under the rules agreed upon, the highest bidder would get the option to buy the other's property. Rouse won the auction in 1983 for an undisclosed amount. Originally, Rouse envisioned a US$150 million 38-story skyscraper, but on April 5, 1984, Rouse officially announced his plans to build a complex that would include two office towers, one 65 stories the other 55 stories, a hotel, and retail space. Rumors and local lore speculate Rouse spent so much money buying the land that he had to build something that justified the expense.

Opposition to the project had begun before the official announcement at a Planning Commission meeting on April 5. The meeting was attended by 300 people and a number of attendees were opposed or skeptical of the idea that the skyscrapers would be taller than City Hall. Critics feared breaking the gentlemen's agreement would lead to the development of more tall skyscrapers that would end up dwarfing City Hall and changing the makeup of the city. Critic of the plan and former Philadelphia city planner Edmund Bacon said, "Once [the height ceiling is] smashed, it's gone." A phone poll conducted by the Philadelphia Daily News had callers opposing breaking the height barrier by 3,809 to 1,822. A Philadelphia Inquirer editorial feared the skyscrapers would ruin downtown. The location of City Hall was intended as the city's center from the city's founding, and critics feared taller buildings would move the city's center away from City Hall. Critics of breaking the height ceiling favored the smaller scale of the cityscape and felt that a Philadelphia with skyscrapers would affect the livability of the city. Edmund Bacon and Center City civic leaders said that Philadelphia owes its livability and charm to its low profile. Chairman of the City Planning Commission, Graham S. Finney, noted that there was a general feeling that the sky above the city was considered a public space. Supporters of breaking the height limitation noted that the project would bring needed jobs and business to Center City and that shorter buildings were already blocking views of City Hall from certain directions.

A planning commission meeting was held on May 3 to decide if they would approve skyscrapers that break the height limit. Executive director of the commissioners, Barbara J. Kaplan, said the project had "substantial merit" and "that there is an opportunity here we should not pass up." She cited that the project would create 12,000 jobs and US$15 million in tax revenue. Opponent Lee Copeland, dean of the University of Pennsylvania's Graduate School of Fine Arts, said the height limit was "a kind of Philadelphia golden rule which is part of the spirit and tradition of our past." The meeting ended with the commission deciding to prevent buildings taller than City Hall while it studies the issue for one year. In May, the Philadelphia City Council announced its support for the project because of the jobs it would create. On June 13, Philadelphia mayor Wilson Goode came out in favor of the project. He proposed the creation of a special ordinance that would allow buildings taller than City Hall between 16th and 20th Streets and the north side of Chestnut Street and the south side of John F. Kennedy Boulevard. Upset at the mayor's support for the project, Edmund Bacon resigned from a commission about Philadelphia's future. Bacon called the complex "a total disaster," adding that, "It absolutely decimates the scale of Center City, and once it's been done, there's no stopping it."

=== Construction ===
Phase 1 of the complex, called One Liberty Place, broke ground on May 13, 1985. One Liberty Place would be the tallest structure of the complex. The skyscraper became the tallest structure in Philadelphia on September 10, 1986, when the first 25-foot-long (7.6 m) steel columns of the skyscraper's 44th floor were installed. One Liberty Place was topped off on December 12 with a ceremony that included a laser light show and Mayor Goode, who said the tower "breaks the status quo of the city and says we arrived". On March 27, 1987, Robert Heenan, Jr., a 22-year-old glazier, fell 42 stories to his death after his safety line snapped when it got caught in a hoist mechanism. A month later, on May 27, the tower's spire was placed at the top of the building. Placing the spire was delayed when it was discovered sections of the spire didn't align with each other and had to be re-welded. Conrail became the first major tenant to lease space when it signed its lease in December 1985, but by April 1987 only twenty percent of the building was leased. Conrail became the first tenant to move in when the building officially opened on August 17.

One Liberty Place was only about one-third full by the end of 1987 when plans for Two Liberty Place were given the green light after Cigna agreed to relocate its 4,400 employees from 15 different Philadelphia buildings to the skyscraper. Cigna agreed to lease the entire 1,200,000 square feet (110,000 m^{2}) of Two Liberty Place on December 14. Phase 2 of the complex broke ground on February 16, 1988 with a ceremony that included thousands of purple, blue, and white balloons being released. Phase two of the project consisted of the remainder of the Liberty Place complex, the Two Liberty Tower, a Ritz-Carlton Hotel, a two-story shopping mall, and a parking garage. The Ritz-Carlton Hotel opened on November 5, 1990, and the shopping mall, called Shops at Liberty Place, opened a week later on November 13. The mall opened during an economic downturn and a quarter of the mall space was vacant. Fifty stores and fourteen restaurants leased space when the mall opened. Two Liberty Place finished construction by the end of the year.

=== Completion and later years ===
In 1990, Rouse sold his interest in One Liberty Place to Japanese insurance company Chyoda. Also, in 1995, the owners of the Ritz-Carlton Hotel, which included Rouse, defaulted on its US$64 million loan. After a sheriff's auction on December 4 of that year, the creditor, Teachers Insurance and Annuity Association, took ownership of the property. The hotel again changed ownership in 1996 when Teachers Insurance and Annuity Association agreed to sell all its hotel properties to Starwood. In 1999 One Liberty Place, Two Liberty Place, and the Shops of Liberty Place were put up for sale. At the time, One Liberty Place was owned by Teachers Insurance and Annuity Association and Chyoda. Two Liberty Place was owned by a partnership led by Willard Rouse called 1650 Market Associates, and the Shops of Liberty Place was owned jointly by the Teachers Insurance and Annuity Association and 1650 Market Associates. One Liberty Place and the Shops at Liberty Place were sold later that year to Sunbelt Management a Palm Beach Gardens, Florida firm owned by German businessman Hugo Mann. Sunbelt acquired the property for a bargain price of US$250 million. The bargain price was a result of One Liberty Place being 99.9 percent leased at the time of the sale and the majority of long-term leases signed when the real estate market was depressed. Rents for One Liberty Place were around US$10 lower than competing office buildings. Two Liberty Place was struggling to find a buyer because it was uncertain Cigna would renew its lease which would expire in 2006.

In January 1999, the Ritz-Carlton announced it would not be renewing its lease at its Liberty Place location and would be relocating to Two Mellon Center. The St. Regis Hotels & Resorts hotel took its place later that year. The St. Regis wasn't able to maintain the same room rates as Philadelphia's other luxury hotels and was re-branded as the Westin in February 2000, now focusing on business travelers. In June 2002, Two Liberty Place was sold to Shorenstein Properties of San Francisco. The sale was reported to be for $US200 million and included Teachers Insurance and Annuity Association continuing as first-mortgage lender. On April 26, 2004, Cigna announced it would remain in Two Liberty Place after getting millions of dollars in incentives from the city and state, though would be leasing less space. With 800,000 square feet (74,000 m^{2}) vacant, Shorenstein Properties and Teachers Insurance and Annuity Association sold their interests in Two Liberty Place to private equity firm America's Capital Partners and its partner residential developer Falcone Group for US$151 million.

Shortly after buying Two Liberty Place, America's Capital Partners announced it would be converting the top floors of the skyscraper into luxury condominiums. The Residences at Two Liberty officially opened March 7 with the sample units finished. Conversion of the upper floors on the remaining 122 condominiums began that same month. In 2008, newly moved-in condominium owners were outraged at the plan of putting two Unisys signs with illuminated 9.8-foot-high (3 m) red letters more than halfway up two sides of Two Liberty Place. Information technology company Unisys was planning to make four floors of the skyscraper its corporate headquarters and the signs were part of its plan to re-brand the company. The Philadelphia Zoning Board eventually rejected the sign idea, and Unisys ended up not moving its headquarters out of Blue Bell, Pennsylvania, noting the economy – and not rejection of the sign – was the basis for the decision.

The Westin Philadelphia was sold by Starwood in November 2005 to HEI Hotels & Resorts. In 2006, HEI Hospitality spent US$10 million on renovating the hotel which included updating the decor and adding wireless internet access. On June 18, 2007, a new skyscraper, the Comcast Center was topped off and officially became the tallest building in the city. The Comcast Center ended One Liberty Place's 19-year place as Philadelphia's tallest building. In September 2009, Eola Capital acquired America's Capital Partners' entire office building portfolio, including the office portion of Two Liberty Place. Parkway Properties Inc. bought Eola's property-management business and office properties in 2011. The Teacher Retirement System of Texas, also part of the transaction, would own 70 percent of the building while Parkway would hold 19 percent stake in the building. Utah Retirement Systems, a public pension fund, also owns an 11 percent stake in the skyscraper. In October 2016, Coretrust Capital Partners LLC of Los Angeles acquired the office portion of Two Liberty Place by purchasing controlling interests in multiple ownership entities for $219 million. The seller was a partnership advised and led by Parkway Properties, Inc. of Orlando, Florida (NYSE: PKY).

== Architecture ==
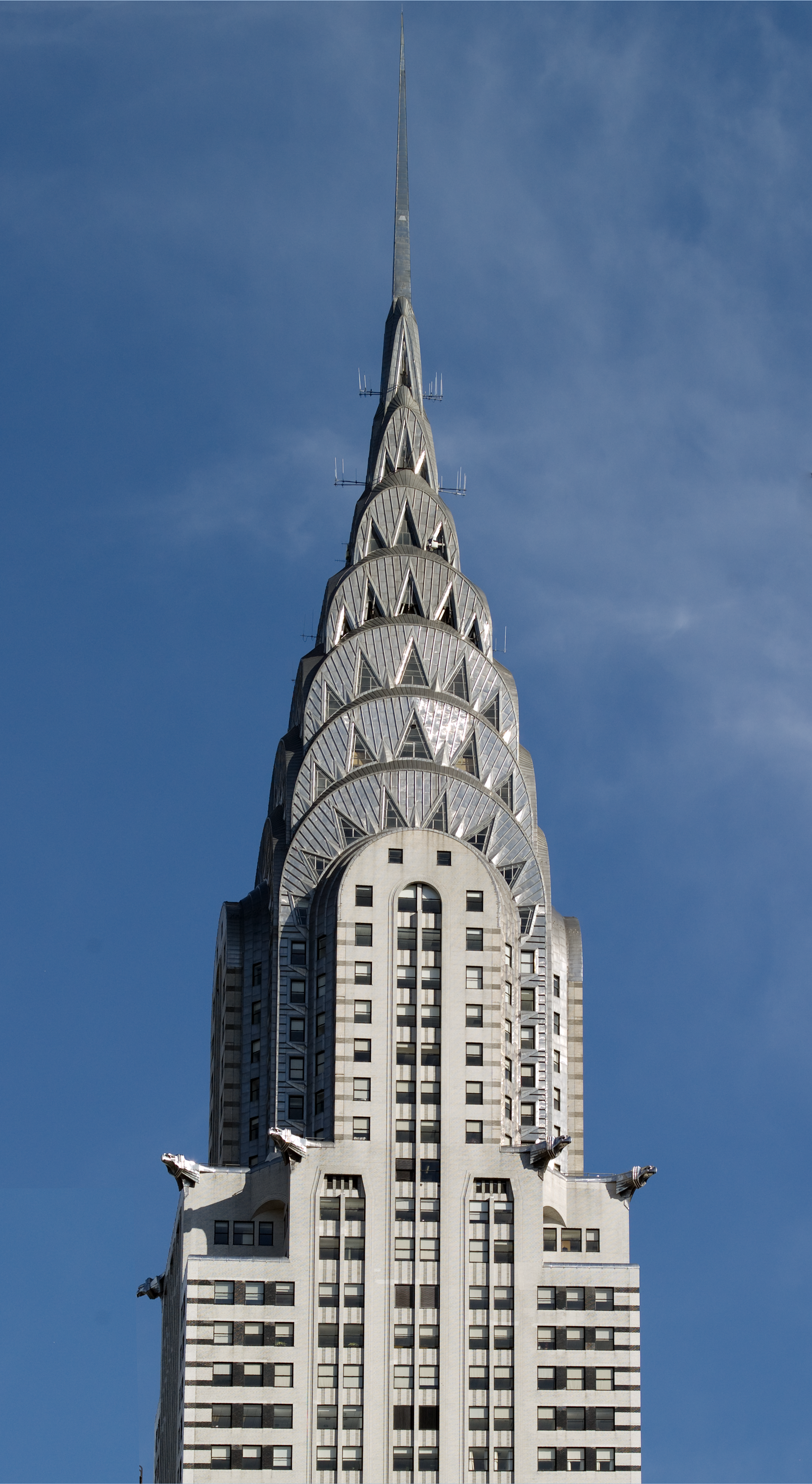
The design of Liberty Place was heavily influenced by New York City's Chrysler Building, September 2007

Liberty Place is a building complex consisting of two skyscrapers, a hotel, parking garage, and a shopping mall that connects the structures. Located in Center City, Philadelphia, Pennsylvania, Liberty Place was designed by Chicago-based architectural firm Murphy/Jahn. Architect Helmut Jahn designed One Liberty Place and was a consulting architect for the rest of the complex. The two skyscrapers are constructed with a steel structure held up with eight large pillars on the buildings' perimeters and a central core that contains the elevators. The perimeter pillars are connected to keep the towers rigid while allowing for the maximum amount of interior space. The exterior of the towers are made up of granite, aluminium, and glass panels, with the amount of glass used increasing at the towers' spires. The majority of the exteriors on the lower levels and rest of the complex is made of stone.

The Bank of the Southwest Tower (Houston, Texas; never built) was also originally designed by Helmut Jahn and served as the primary inspiration for the design of both Liberty Place towers, as well as for such iconic towers as Frankfurt's MesseTurm.

=== One Liberty Place ===
Located on the corner of Market and 17th Streets, One Liberty Place, built between 1985 and 1987, is 61 stories tall. At 945 feet (288 m), it is the third-tallest building in Philadelphia. One Liberty Place contains 1,200,000 square feet (110,000 m^{2}), with an average floor size of 24,000 square feet (2,200 m^{2}). Helmut Jahn is an admirer of American eclecticism and Art Deco; when designing Liberty Place, he used New York City's Chrysler Building as a reference. Rouse said that he calls it the "Son of Chrysler" because of the similarity in design. The most notable similarity to the Chrysler Building is the 146-foot-tall (45 m) spire that crowns the skyscraper. One Liberty Place's spire is made up of four gabled setbacks leading up to a 2-ton, 47-foot-long (14 m) steel spire on top. Instead of curved setbacks like on the Chrysler Building, One Liberty Place's setbacks use straight angular edges.

Like the Chrysler Building, One Liberty Place has a square shape with recessed corners. The facade is also inspired by the Chrysler Building, using glass and aluminum to invoke the Chrysler Building's horizontal and vertical shapes along the building's core. The facade's color ranges between grays, silver, and metallic blues and uses horizontal bands of granite and glass to de-emphasize the visual impact of the height of the tower. The building's lobby features white and gray marble imported from Italy. The elevator lobby and the elevator cabs echo the shape of the building's spire while the elevator doors feature abstraction of One Liberty Place itself.

=== Two Liberty Place ===
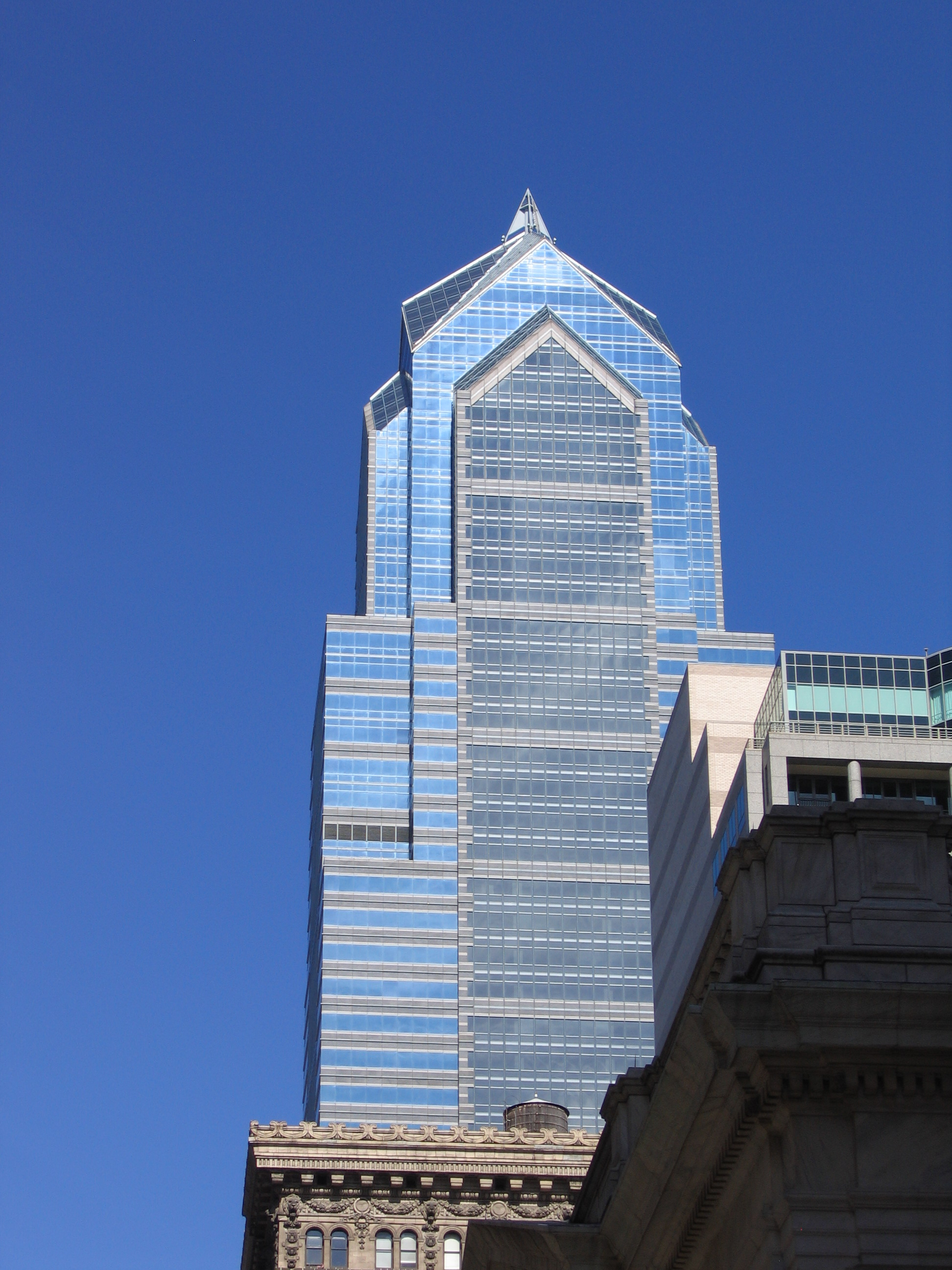
Philadelphia's Two Liberty Place resembles Chicago's Two Prudential Plaza architecturally, July 2007

Two Liberty Place is based on the same influences as its counterpart tower and uses a similar shape and matching facade. Located at the corner of 16th and Chestnut Streets, Two Liberty Place is 847-foot-tall (258 m) making it the fourth-tallest building in the city. The 58-story skyscraper is shorter than its counterpart, but also contains about 1,200,000 square feet (110,000 m^{2}) of space. Two Liberty Place's spire contains fewer gabled setbacks giving the tower a more squat appearance, but allowing about the same amount of interior space as One Liberty Place. The design of the spire was a result of the building's intended tenant Cigna which wanted the large floor space.

Floors 37 and 40 to 57 is about 300,000 square feet (28,000 m^{2}) of condominium space. Floors 38, 39 and 58 are mechanical floors. The 122 luxury condominiums, called The Residences at Two Liberty, are the highest in the city, with condominiums located between 546 and 765 feet (166 and 233 m) above ground level. Every condominium unit features a cappuccino machine, Italian-made Snaidero kitchen cabinetry, Miele appliances, and concierge service. The 37th floor contains a full spa and sauna, pool, and a gourmet restaurant called R2L which opened on January 21, 2010. The restaurant occupies 11,000 square feet (1,000 m^{2}) and can seat almost 300. The condominiums range in price from US$800,000 for a 40th-floor single bedroom to more than US$15 million for a 7,200-square-foot (670 m^{2}) penthouse. Because of low sales of the condos, the top portion of the building was to be converted into a boutique hotel in 2013. Due to low interest in the hotel, the top 10 floors of The Residences (floors 48–57) were to be converted into 60 condo units in 2015. Two Liberty Place's lobby was originally specifically designed for Cigna which used to lease the entire building. After Cigna reduced its presence in the tower, three separate lobbies were created, each with its own elevator bank, one for Cigna, one for the other corporate tenants, and the third for the residents.

=== Hotel and mall ===
The Shops at Liberty Place
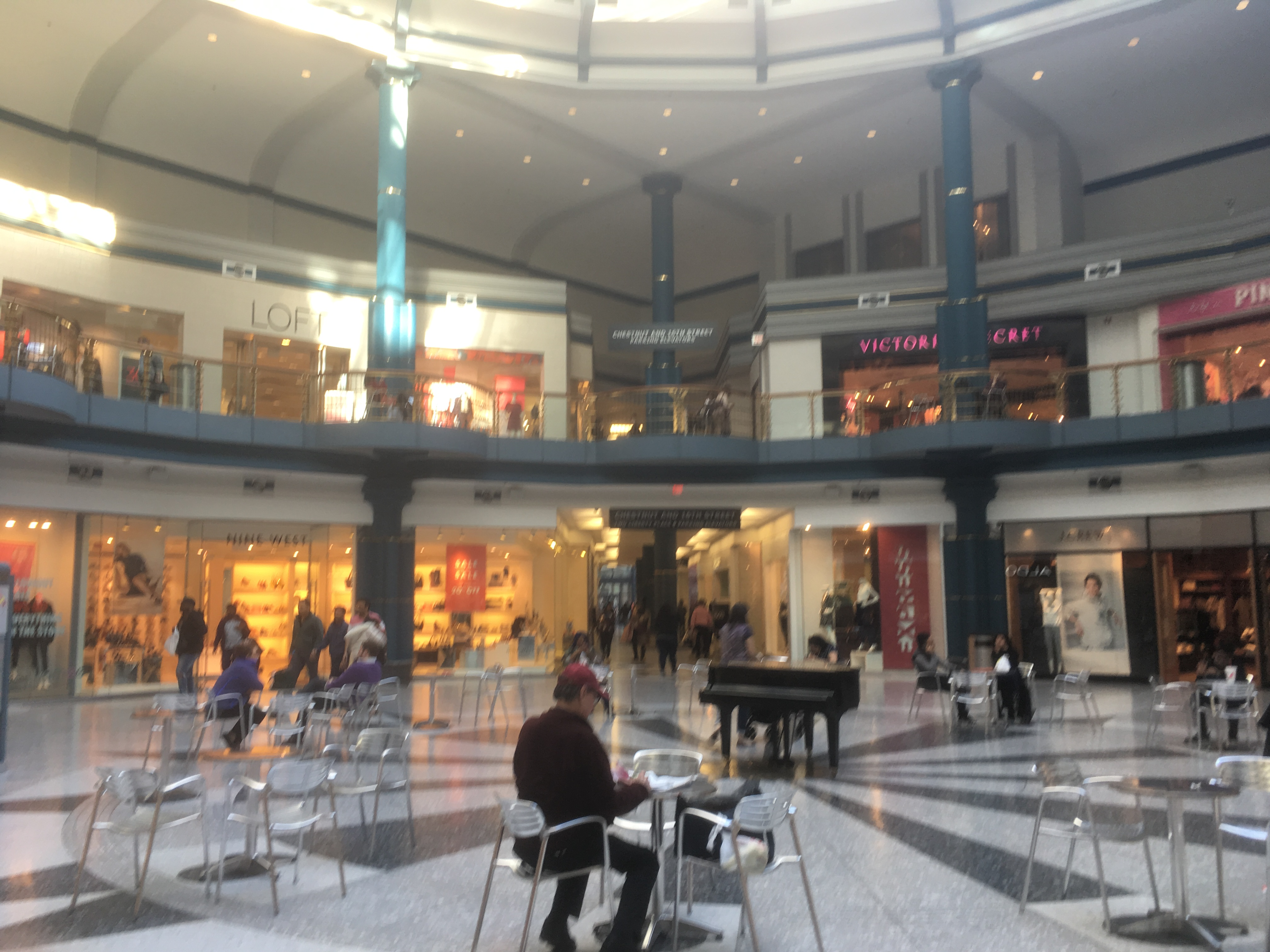
- Interior view, c. February 2017
- Location: Philadelphia, Pennsylvania, U.S.
- Address: 1625 Chestnut Street, 19103
- Opened: November 13, 1990; 35 years ago
- Developer: Rouse & Associates and Enterprise Development Co.
- Manager: JLL Properties; Cushman & Wakefield
- Owner: Metropolis Investment Holdings Inc.
- Architect: Wallace Roberts & Todd (WRT)
- Floors: 2
- Website: www.shopsatliberty.com

The Westin Philadelphia is a 14-story hotel located on 17th Street. The Westin contains 289-rooms, 14,000 square feet (1,300 m^{2}) of meeting space, a ballroom, and a restaurant. Near the entrance of the Westin on 17th Street is the entrance to Liberty Place's underground parking garage. The four-story garage, which also has an entrance on 16th street, has room for 750 cars.

The Shops at Liberty Place contains 143,000 square feet (13,000 m^{2}). The two-story mall faces Chestnut Street between 16th and 17th Street. The mall was designed to contain between 80 and 85 stores, including a food court area. The mall's main feature is a round atrium that is topped by a large glass dome. The dome is actually in the shape of a tetracontagon allowing a large amount of light into the mall and allows views of the Liberty Place towers and the PNC Bank Building. The glass dome is based on the main conservatory at the New York Botanical Garden.

Jones Lang LaSalle (JLL) put the mall up for sale in January 2026.

== Reception and legacy ==
The construction of One Liberty Place radically changed the Philadelphia skyline. While critics were upset the building would be taller than City Hall, flat-topped office buildings nearly as tall had surrounded much of City Hall. With the construction of One Liberty Place, Philadelphia now had a definable skyline that it had not had since City Hall was obscured. The breaking of the gentlemen's agreement paved the way for other skyscrapers taller than City Hall. After One Liberty Place was approved, a building boom of tall office skyscrapers in Center City such as the Mellon Bank Center and Commerce Square began. This construction boom, which lasted until the early 1990s, turned the West Market Street district into the city's premier office location and gave what architecture critic Paul Goldberger called "one of the most appealing skylines of any major American city". The success of Liberty Place, along with helping expose an extortion scheme involving a city councilman, helped turn developer Willard Rouse into "Public Hero No. 1" in Philadelphia during the late 1980s.

On April 5, 1984, The Philadelphia Inquirer wrote: "By 'gentlemen's agreement' (the statue of William Penn atop City Hall) remains highest. It is a supremacy that must be maintained, for philosophical and aesthetic and, indeed, economic reasons - density caused by towering skyscrapers is one of the surest ways to render a downtown ruinously overbuilt while its fringes wither." In 1990, the Inquirer took it all back, noting that Rouse transformed Philadelphia's skyline to near universal acclaim. In 1987, Paul Goldberger called One Liberty Place the best skyscraper Helmut Jahn has ever designed and the best skyscraper built in Philadelphia since the PSFS Building. Goldberger noted that "The skyline of Philadelphia, far from being destroyed by One Liberty Place, is in fact given new life by this building. The skyline has been transformed from one of the flattest of any American city to one of the richest." He praised the shape which he said "strikes a remarkable balance between dignity and verve". He was critical that the building was too busy with too many panels and stripes, but acknowledge it was more restrained than other of Helmut Jahn's buildings.

Two Liberty Place was less warmly received by critics. Goldberger said that despite the similarity in appearance, Two Liberty was "as much of a slab as a tower, with a spire that looks as if it was plopped awkwardly on top instead of having grown naturally out of the building's overall form." He also criticized giving One Liberty Place a smaller, similar twin which he said gives the complex an odd look.

A story of the "curse" of Billy Penn sprang up after Philadelphia sports teams failed to win championship games after the construction of One Liberty Place. The "curse" stated that no Philadelphia sports team will win a championship while a building rises taller than the statue of William Penn on City Hall. Construction of the Comcast Center included a small statue of William Penn on the tower's highest point, and in 2008 the Philadelphia Phillies won the World Series, effectively proving the "curse".

== Tenants ==
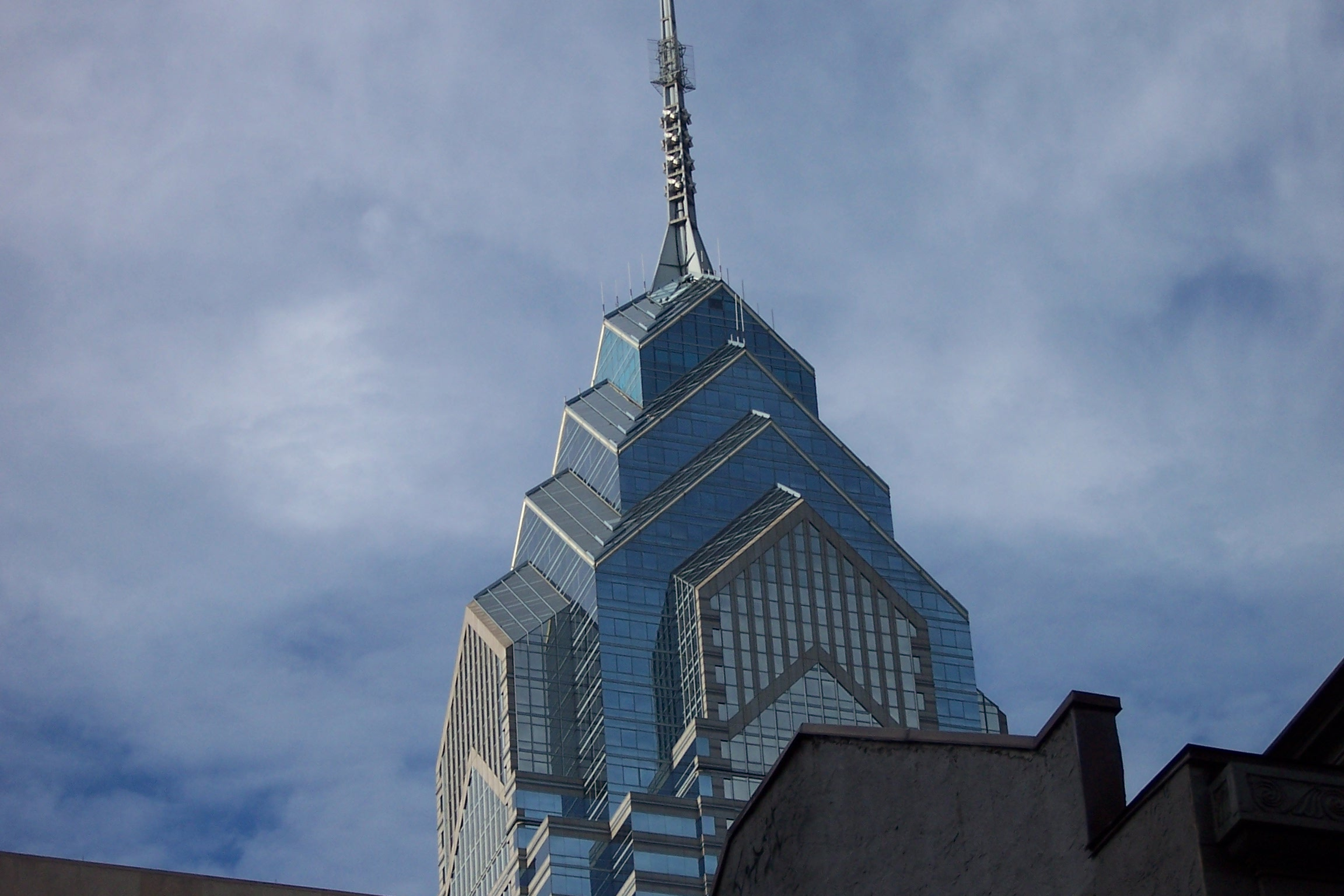
Close-up of One Liberty Place spire, May 2015

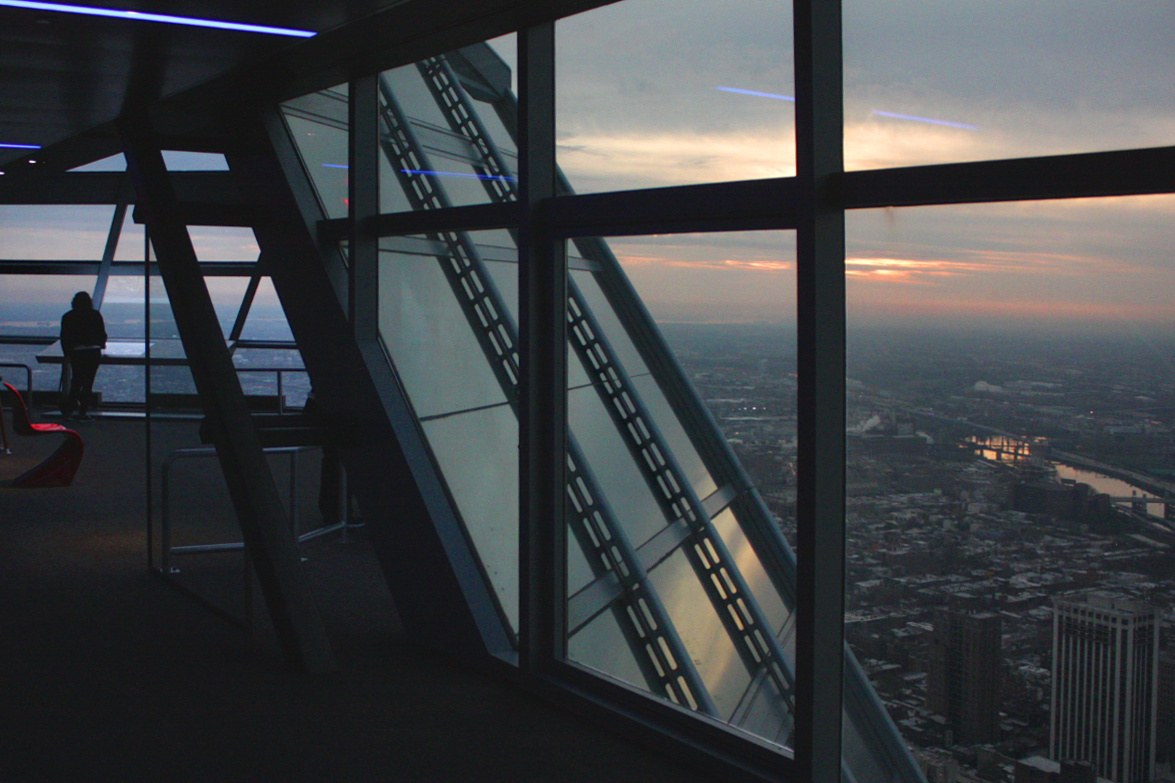
Southwest view of South Philadelphia and New Jersey from One Liberty Place's observation deck, December 2015

=== One Liberty Place ===
One Liberty Place's first two tenants were railroad company Conrail and the law firm Hoyle, Morris & Kerr. Occupying the building between August 1987 and 1992, Conrail leased about 115,000 square feet (11,000 m^{2}). Hoyle, Morris & Kerr leased 63,000 square feet (5,900 m^{2}) and moved into the tower in November 1987. Law firm Reed Smith Shaw & McClay also moved into the skyscraper in 1987. The law firm leases 110,538 square feet (10,000 m^{2}) on floors 24 through 27. Another law firm, White and Williams, leased space in 1990. The firm occupies 120,000 square feet (11,000 m^{2}) on floors 15 through 20.

Other tenants include American International Group, which leases 123,500 square feet (11,000 m^{2}), global management consulting firm ZS Associates, and pharmaceutical consulting firm Campbell Alliance. Brokerage firm Smith Barney leases 49,394 square feet (4,600 m^{2}) at One Liberty Place on the 42nd and 43rd floors, high-profile plaintiff law firm Saltz, Mongeluzzi, Barrett and Bendesky leases space on the 52nd floor, and JPMorgan Chase began leasing space on the 47th floor in 1998.

New tenants in the 2000s include Pelino & Lentz, which leased 32,770 square feet (3,000 m^{2}) in 2005 and Clark Capital, which moved into 11,000 square feet (1,000 m^{2}) on the 53rd floor in January 2006. Kleinbard Bell & Brecker leased 20,400 square feet (1,900 m^{2}) on the 46th floor in 2007 and Baker Tilly has leased 50,000 square feet (4,600 m^{2}) on the 44th and 45th floors since 2008. Past tenants include Pennrose Properties LLC, intellectual property law firm Woodcock Washburn, Logan Capital Management, Chubb Corp., law firm Duane Morris, and Cigna, which leased 55,000 square feet (5,100 m^{2}) until it consolidated space in Two Liberty Place in 2006.

One Liberty Place is leased and managed by Cushman & Wakefield. The management office is located on the 6th floor. Cushman & Wakefield's Philadelphia office is also housed in One Liberty Place on the 33rd floor.

Paris-based Montparnasse 56 Group (M56) announced in 2014 that it would open an observation deck on the 57th floor of One Liberty Place. The One Liberty Observation Deck, also called Philly from the Top, opened to the public on November 28, 2015, but has been permanently closed as of September 2021. The observation deck is fully enclosed and offers 360-degree panoramic views of the city from 883 feet above street level, which was prior to its closing the highest public access level in Philadelphia as of 2016.

=== Two Liberty Place ===
Cigna leased the entirety of Two Liberty Place from its opening to 1999, when it sold its property and casualty unit to ACE Limited By 2007, Ace Ltd. had left for 436 Walnut St. and Cigna had shrunk its presence in the tower to 400,000 square feet (37,000 m^{2}). What was not converted into condominium space in 2007 was the first office space in Two Liberty open for leasing in the skyscraper's history.

Law firm Eckert Seamans Cherin & Mellott moved into 50,000 square feet (4,600 m^{2}) in January 2007 and BremnerDuke Healthcare moved into the tower in 2008. Unisys Corp. originally intended to make Two Liberty Place its headquarters but never moved in. The nearly 90,000 square feet (8,400 m^{2}) of space Unisys leases is being subleased to others. Tenants subleasing from Unisys include real estate brokerage firm Studley, Inc., which previously had leased space in One Liberty Place. Studley Inc. occupies 6,842 square feet (640 m^{2}) on the 34th floor and moved into the skyscraper in 2010. Law firm Duffy and Keenan leased space in 2008, Grosvenor Capital Management leased 16,275 square feet (1,500 m^{2}) also in 2008, law firm Kutak Rock leased space on the 28th floor in July 2009, and in 2009 law firm Buchanan, Ingersoll & Rooney moved into Two Liberty Place, occupying 77,018 square feet (7,200 m^{2}) of the 31st, 32nd, and 33rd floors of the tower. Other tenants include law firm Elliott Greenleaf and Republic First Bancorp.

Notable residents of The Residences at Two Liberty include Tom Knox, who paid US$7.68 million for a condominium, and Chase Lenfest, son of media entrepreneur H. F. Lenfest, who paid US$7.68 million for a penthouse. Bon Jovi lead guitarist Richie Sambora spent US$3.58 million for a luxury condominium of the 52nd floor. Other residents have included former Philadelphia Phillies pitcher Cole Hamels, former Philadelphia 76ers player Andre Iguodala, and executives from Comcast, GlaxoSmithKline, and Cigna. As a result of slow sales, the top floors (48–57) of the Residences at Two Liberty Place were going to be converted into a boutique hotel. Due to low interest in using the space as a hotel, plans for the hotel were scrapped, and instead, the raw floors were being converted into 60 condo units in 2015.

== See also ==
- List of tallest buildings in Philadelphia
- List of tallest freestanding steel structures

Records
Preceded by U.S. Steel Tower	Tallest building in Pennsylvania; 288 metres (945 ft); 1987–2008	Succeeded by Comcast Center
Preceded by Philadelphia City Hall	Tallest building in Philadelphia; 288 metres (945 ft); 1987–2008	Succeeded by Comcast Center
