= Mithun, Inc =

Mithun
- Company type: Private
- Industry: Architecture
- Founded: 1949; 76 years ago
- Founder: Omer Mithun
- Headquarters: Seattle, Washington, United States
- Website: http://www.mithun.com/

Mithun is a multidisciplinary design firm with offices in Seattle, San Francisco and Los Angeles. The company provides integrated design services including architecture, landscape architecture, interior design, urban design and planning. In 2023 Mithun won the 2023 American Institute of Architects Architecture Firm Award. This national accolade celebrates exemplary design and practice and is the highest honor the AIA bestows upon an architecture firm.

== History ==
The firm was founded in 1949 by Omer Mithun, a professor of architecture at the University of Washington as a private practice in Bellevue, Washington. Mithun incorporated in 1953, and became Mithun Partners in 1988. The practice moved to Seattle in 1990 and in 2000 renovated their present-day headquarters on Pier 56. In 2008, Mithun opened its San Francisco office and in 2018 opened a third office in Los Angeles. Mithun is led by a board of directors, presided over by Dave Goldberg - FAIA, and partners Anne Torney - FAIA and Brendan Connolly - FAIA.

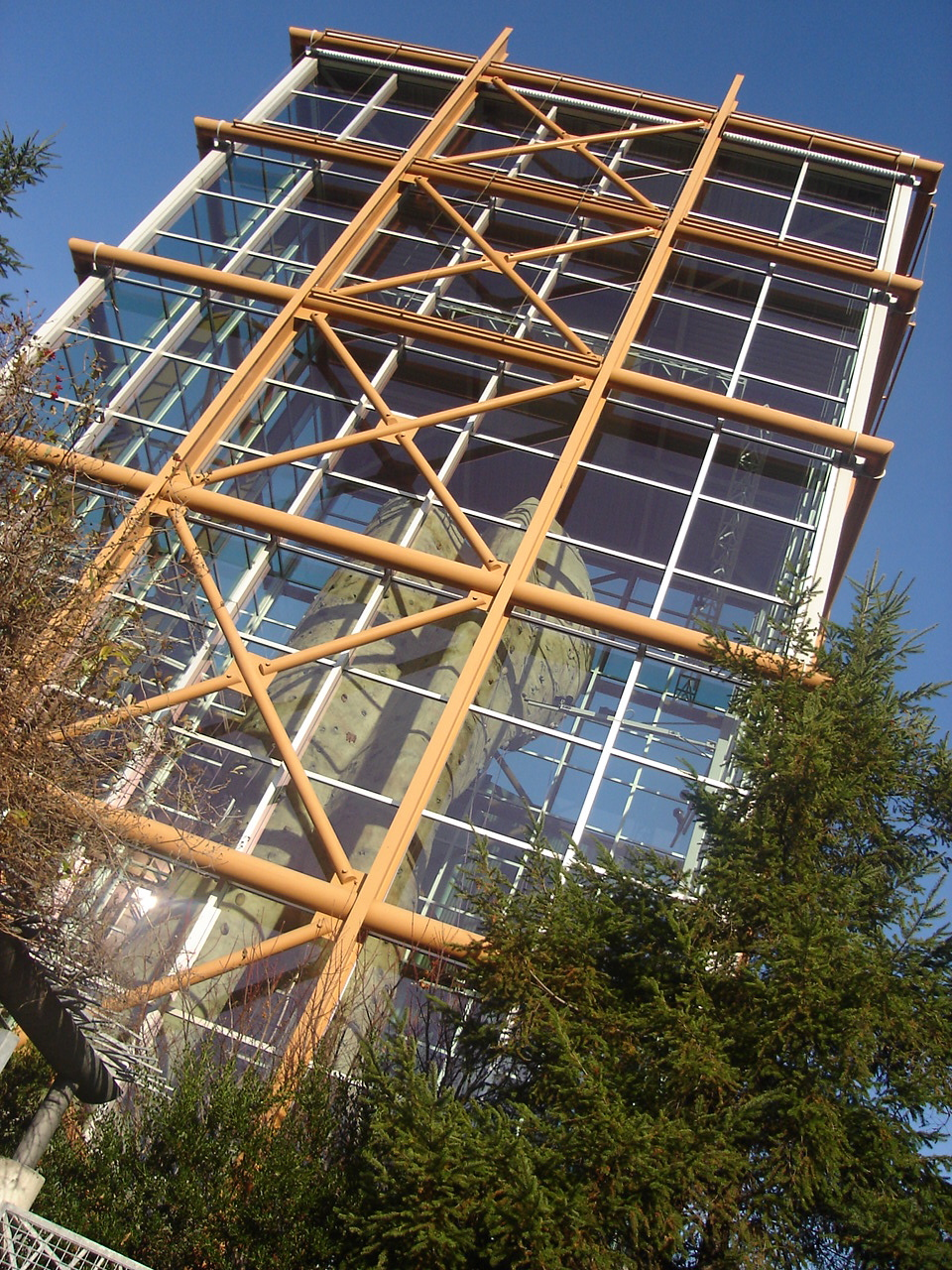
Mithun-designed REI Flagship Store in Seattle, Washington, USA, 2005

== Notable works ==
=== Buildings ===
- Epler Hall at Portland State University - six-story, 65,000-square-foot (6,000 m^{2}) dormitory.
- IslandWood (formerly the Puget Sound Environmental Learning Center) (2002) - LEED-NC Gold rated. Nationally recognized project and environmental case study featuring low-impact construction, recycled materials, photovoltaics and a custom-designed LivingMachine to treat grey-water and black-water on site.
- REI Flagship Store (1996) - "the apotheosis of the exposed-viscera school of architecture -- all the building's structural guts are on glorious exhibit, from the electric conduits to the I-beams and turnbuckles that hold everything together."

=== Research & Planning ===
- Blue Ring (1999) - Seattle's open space strategy for the Center City. The two reports Blue Ring, The Next Decade and Blue Ring, the Next 100 Years were conceived as a companion to the Olmsted Brothers' green ring of parks and parkways that encircle Seattle.
- Center for Urban Agriculture(2007) - conceptual design of an off-grid 318-unit multi family building that is energy and water self-sufficient by utilizing on site greenhouses, rooftop gardens, a chicken farm, and areas for growing vegetables and grains. The design exercise won "Best of Show", lauded as "most visionary" in the Cascadia Region Green Building Council's Living Building Challenge.
- Lloyd Crossing Sustainable Urban Design Plan (2004) - includes onsite and offsite strategies contribute to the capability of a 35-block ecosystem in Portland, Oregon, USA, emulating the natural systems of a pristine forest, even as the area's density increases fivefold. The plan received national recognition including the American Institute of Architects 2006 Institute Honor Awards for Regional and Urban Design, a 2005 AIA/COTE Top Ten Green Projects.

== See also ==
- Lee Copeland
