= Lucinda Sanders =

Lucinda Sanders is CEO and partner at OLIN, a landscape architecture firm. She has had a leading role in many of OLIN's most recognized projects, and she shapes OLIN's goals of design and sustainability.

== Background and education ==
Sanders studied landscape architecture at Rutgers University and earned a master's degree in landscape architecture from the University of Pennsylvania.

== Professional career ==
In addition to being CEO, Sanders is one of six partners at OLIN. She wrote a book about OLIN's work in placemaking published by Monacelli Press. Her work is known for combining OLIN's trademark ecological sensitivity with her own emphasis on social purpose and urbanism. Her project management skills are also credited with bringing major commissions to the firm, including Battery Park City Authority and Carnegie Hall. She is responsible for bringing 30th Street Station District Plan in Philadelphia to the firm. She is also connected to projects that are described as some of the firm's most significant contemporary work, including Comcast Center Plaza and Central Delaware Riverfront Master Plan in Philadelphia and Gap Headquarters in San Francisco.

Her work has been widely recognized. In 2008, Cooper Hewitt awarded Sanders the National Design Award. Philadelphia Magazine describes her as one of the city's best architects of the present.

Sanders is also active in landscape architecture beyond OLIN, and she is credited with raising the profile of the field through her advocacy. She sits on multiple boards and committees that aim to support the field of landscape architecture, including the Landscape Architecture Foundation, the Lady Bird Johnson Wildflower Center Advisory Board, and the CEO Roundtable of Landscape Architects. In 2010, she was asked to be a part of a round-table discussion of leaders in the landscape architecture field discussing the state of the profession. She also regularly lectures at universities and professional associations all over the world and is an Adjunct Professor of Landscape Architecture at the University of Pennsylvania. At the University of Pennsylvania, she teaches an urban design studio that deals with real design scenarios.

=== Major built works ===
- Comcast Center Plaza, Philadelphia
- Central Delaware Riverfront Master Plan, Philadelphia
- Gap Headquarters, San Francisco
- Fountain Square, Cincinnati
- 30th Street Station District Plan, Philadelphia
- Presidio of San Francisco Main Post

=== Major awards ===
- American Institute of Architects 2012 Honor Award, Regional and Urban Design (Central Delaware Riverfront Master Plan)
- American Society of Landscape Architects 2009 Honor Award (Gap Headquarters)
- Cooper Hewitt National 2008 Design Award
