= Curse of Billy Penn =

Philadelphia sports curse

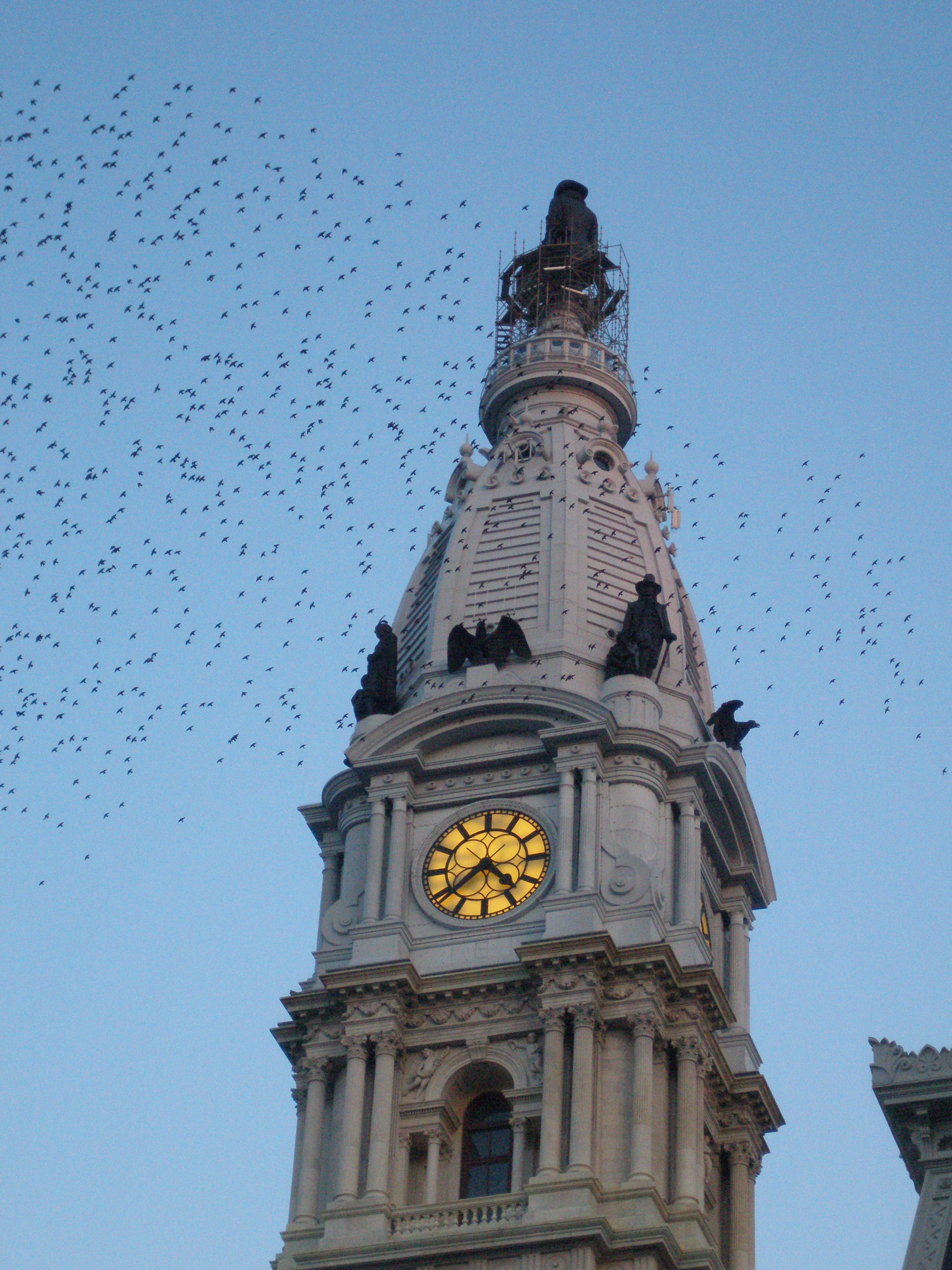
Philadelphia City Hall with the statue of William Penn in the tower's top

The Curse of Billy Penn (1987–2008) was a sports-related curse, urban legend, and popular explanation for the failure of major Philadelphia professional sports teams to win championships following the March 1987 construction of the One Liberty Place skyscraper, which exceeded the height of William Penn's statue atop Philadelphia City Hall. For decades prior to the construction of One Liberty Place, there had been a gentlemen's agreement in place to ensure that no building in Philadelphia would be permitted to be higher than the William Penn statue atop Philadelphia City Hall. This agreement ended with the construction of One Liberty Place in 1987, at which point the curse ostensibly began.

The curse ended on October 29, 2008, when the Philadelphia Phillies won the 2008 World Series, a year and four months after a statuette of the William Penn figure atop City Hall was affixed to the final beam during the June 2007 topping-off of the Comcast Center, which made it the highest building structure in the city at the time.

== Origins ==
Atop Philadelphia City Hall stands a statue of William Penn, the city founder and original proprietor of the colonial-era Province of Pennsylvania. For decades, a "gentlemen's agreement" stated that the Philadelphia Art Commission would approve no building in the city which would rise above this statue. This ended in March 1987, when a modern steel-and-glass skyscraper, One Liberty Place, opened three blocks away. One Liberty Place is taller than City Hall by 397 feet (121 m), rising 945 feet (288 m) in height compared to the height of Penn's hat on City Hall, 547 feet (167 m). Its sister skyscraper, Two Liberty Place, at 848 ft (258 m), followed in 1990.

Philadelphia sports teams had previously enjoyed a run of success in the years prior to the construction and opening of One Liberty Place. Major League Baseball's Phillies won the 1980 World Series and the 1983 National League pennant; the National Hockey League's Flyers won back-to-back Stanley Cups in 1974 and 1975, and appeared in the finals in 1976, 1980, 1985, and 1987; the National Football League's Eagles appeared in Super Bowl XV following the 1980 season, losing to the Oakland Raiders; and the National Basketball Association's 76ers swept the 1983 NBA Finals, as well as making the finals in 1977, 1980, and 1982. Before 1980, the Phillies had appeared in only two other World Series, in 1915 and 1950, and the Eagles had won no NFC conference championships since the 1966 agreement that had created the Super Bowl, while the 76ers won NBA titles in both Philadelphia and in their previous incarnation, the Syracuse Nationals. The Villanova Wildcats won the 1985 NCAA Division I men's basketball tournament in one of the most famous upsets in sports history.

Construction on One Liberty Place began in 1985, two years after the last championship season in Philadelphia.

== Philadelphia sports since curse's inception ==
=== Major-league sports ===
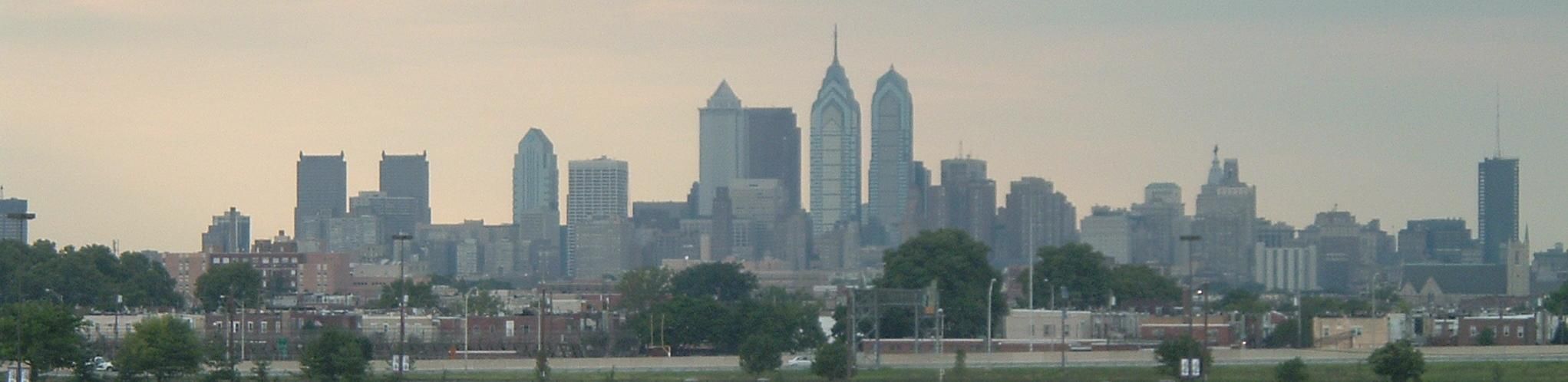
The skyline of Philadelphia from Citizens Bank Park in 2004 with William Penn's statue visible in the right and much taller skycrapers, including One Liberty Place, on the left

After One Liberty Place opened, Philadelphia's franchises began a pattern of failures to win a world championship. The Flyers lost the Stanley Cup Final twice, in 1987 to the Edmonton Oilers in seven games (although the Oilers were heavily favored), two months after One Liberty Place opened, and in 1997, in a four-game sweep by the Detroit Red Wings which was considered a collapse as the Flyers had home-ice advantage and had dominated the previous three playoff series en route to meeting the Red Wings. The Phillies upset the Atlanta Braves to win the NLCS, but then lost the 1993 World Series in six games to the Toronto Blue Jays, with the Series ending on Joe Carter's walk-off 3-run home run. The 76ers lost the 2001 NBA Finals to the Los Angeles Lakers in five games, although the defending champion Lakers were favored despite the Sixers having league MVP Allen Iverson. The Eagles lost three straight NFC Championship games from the 2001 through 2003 seasons, before reaching Super Bowl XXXIX after the 2004 season, only to lose to the New England Patriots by three points.

In fact, the only years that Philadelphia's franchises reached their league's championship round after One Liberty Place opened were years of presidential inaugurations, except for the Flyers in 1987, and losses during such years date back to the 76ers loss in 1977. When the Flyers played for the 2010 Stanley Cup, The Ottawa Citizen reported that the main reason for that lengthy championship drought was because the only years the city's teams played for championships during that time were years presidents were inaugurated. The city's teams had lost championships during such years, beginning with the 76ers themselves in 1977. The exceptions during this period were the Phillies in 1983 and the Flyers in 1987.

In addition, losses in semifinal rounds had occurred ten times since the opening of One Liberty Place. Five of these semifinal eliminations were by the Flyers, in 1989, 1995, 2000, 2004 and 2008. The 2000 team was one win away from a Stanley Cup Final appearance, after leading the eventual champion New Jersey Devils 3–1 before losing three straight (including games five and seven at home), the 2004 team lost game seven of the Eastern Conference Final to the eventual champion Tampa Bay Lightning, and the 2008 team lost to their cross-state rival Pittsburgh Penguins in five games. The Eagles accounted for the other three conference-final losses; they lost the NFC Championship Game (the winner of which meets the winner of the AFC's corresponding game in the Super Bowl) three years in a row from 2001 to 2003, thus becoming the first NFL team to do this in either conference since the Dallas Cowboys of 1980–1982, losing the last two at home after posting the best record in the NFC. No other team in NFL history had lost back-to-back conference title games at home since the NFL began its practice in 1975 of awarding home-field advantage in postseason play based on regular-season record. The Eagles lost the 2001 NFC Championship game on the road to the St. Louis Rams 29–24, the 2002 NFC Championship game at home to the Tampa Bay Buccaneers 27–10, and the 2003 NFC Championship game to the Carolina Panthers 14–3. The Rams and Panthers would both lose to the New England Patriots in Super Bowl XXXVI and Super Bowl XXXVIII, while the Buccaneers won Super Bowl XXXVII over the Oakland Raiders.

=== Other sports ===
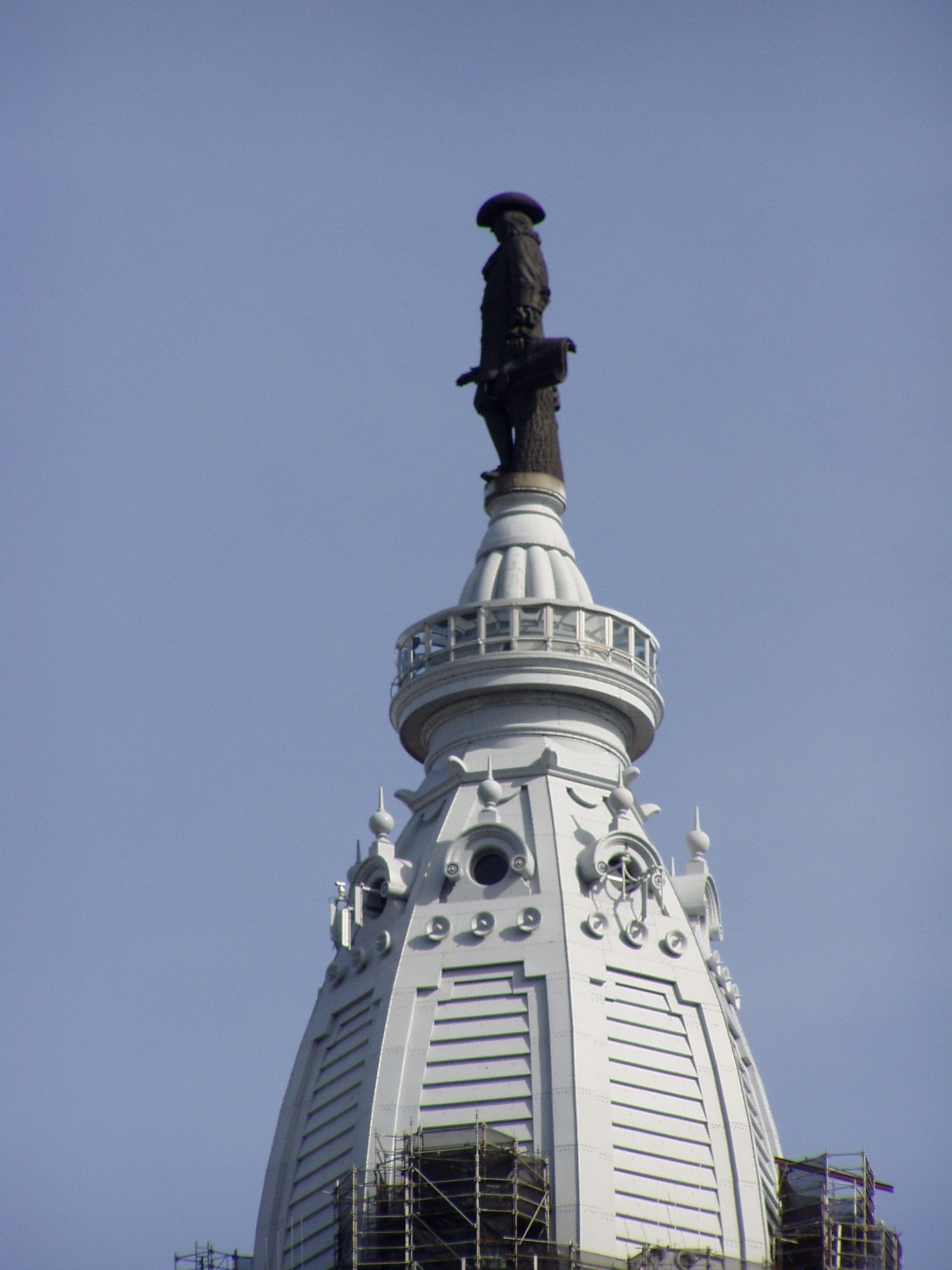
The bronze statue of William Penn atop Philadelphia City Hall

The curse was also said to have affected racehorses from the Philadelphia area, such as the Bensalem-Township-based thoroughbred racehorse Smarty Jones, who saw his bid for horse racing's Triple Crown disappear when he finished second in the 2004 Belmont Stakes behind 36-1 longshot Birdstone after victories in the Kentucky Derby and Preakness Stakes. The curse has also been blamed for the death of the thoroughbred horse Barbaro, who was born and raised in the Philadelphia area and was owned and bred by a couple from West Grove, a borough right outside Philadelphia. Though Barbaro won the 2006 Kentucky Derby, his leg was dramatically shattered two weeks later during the 2006 Preakness Stake, leading to the horse's death.

Although the curse was not generally considered as extending to college sports, two Philadelphia-area college basketball teams, the St. Joseph's Hawks (in Philadelphia) and the Villanova Wildcats (in Villanova), which had successful seasons in 2004 and 2006, respectively, failed to reach the Final Four of the NCAA basketball tournament. Both were eliminated in the fourth-round Elite Eight matches, with St. Joe's, first seed in the East Regional, losing in a close match to Oklahoma State, and Villanova, first seed in the Minneapolis Regional, falling to eventual NCAA-champion Florida. Villanova won the national championship in 1985, two years before the Liberty Place opening. A third Philadelphia-area team, the Temple Owls (in Philadelphia) has also lost five times in the Elite Eight (1988, 1991, 1993, 1999, 2001).

Villanova ended the college basketball drought for the Philadelphia teams with a national championship in 2016 and 2018.

The curse, however, was apparently not extended to professional teams outside the four major sports. The then–Philadelphia Wings of the NLL (indoor lacrosse winter league) won six titles between 1989 and 2001, before moving in 2014, and the now-defunct Philadelphia Barrage of the MLL, an outdoor summer lacrosse league, won three championships (2004, 2006, and 2007). The AHL's Philadelphia Phantoms, the Flyers' top minor-league affiliate from 1996 to 2009, won the Calder Cup championship in 1998 and 2005. Additionally, the Philadelphia KiXX of the MISL won their league's championship in 2002 and 2007. The AFL's Philadelphia Soul won ArenaBowl XXII in 2008, ArenaBowl XXIX in 2016, and ArenaBowl XXX in 2017 before the league folded in 2019. The Philadelphia Freedoms, a tennis team in the World Team Tennis league, also won titles in 2001 and 2006. One exception was the Philadelphia Charge, a women's soccer team in the now-defunct WUSA, which did not win a championship during the three years the WUSA existed, from 2001 to 2003.

== Decoration of Penn's statue ==
In spite of the Curse, when Philadelphia sports teams have reached their league's championship round, Penn's statue has sometimes been decorated to support that team's success. After the Phillies won the 1993 National League pennant, for instance, Penn was fitted with an oversized red Phillies baseball cap; when the Flyers went to the 1997 Stanley Cup Final, the city adorned Penn with an orange-torso-with-white-shoulders Flyers jersey, representing the Flyers' road jersey.

When the Sixers faced the Lakers in the 2001 NBA Finals, Penn's statue was not decorated. Pat Croce, president and part-owner of the Sixers, said he would have "decked out" the statue had the Sixers won but not before. Penn's statue was also left untouched when the Eagles went to Super Bowl XXXIX in 2005.

== The Curse lifted ==
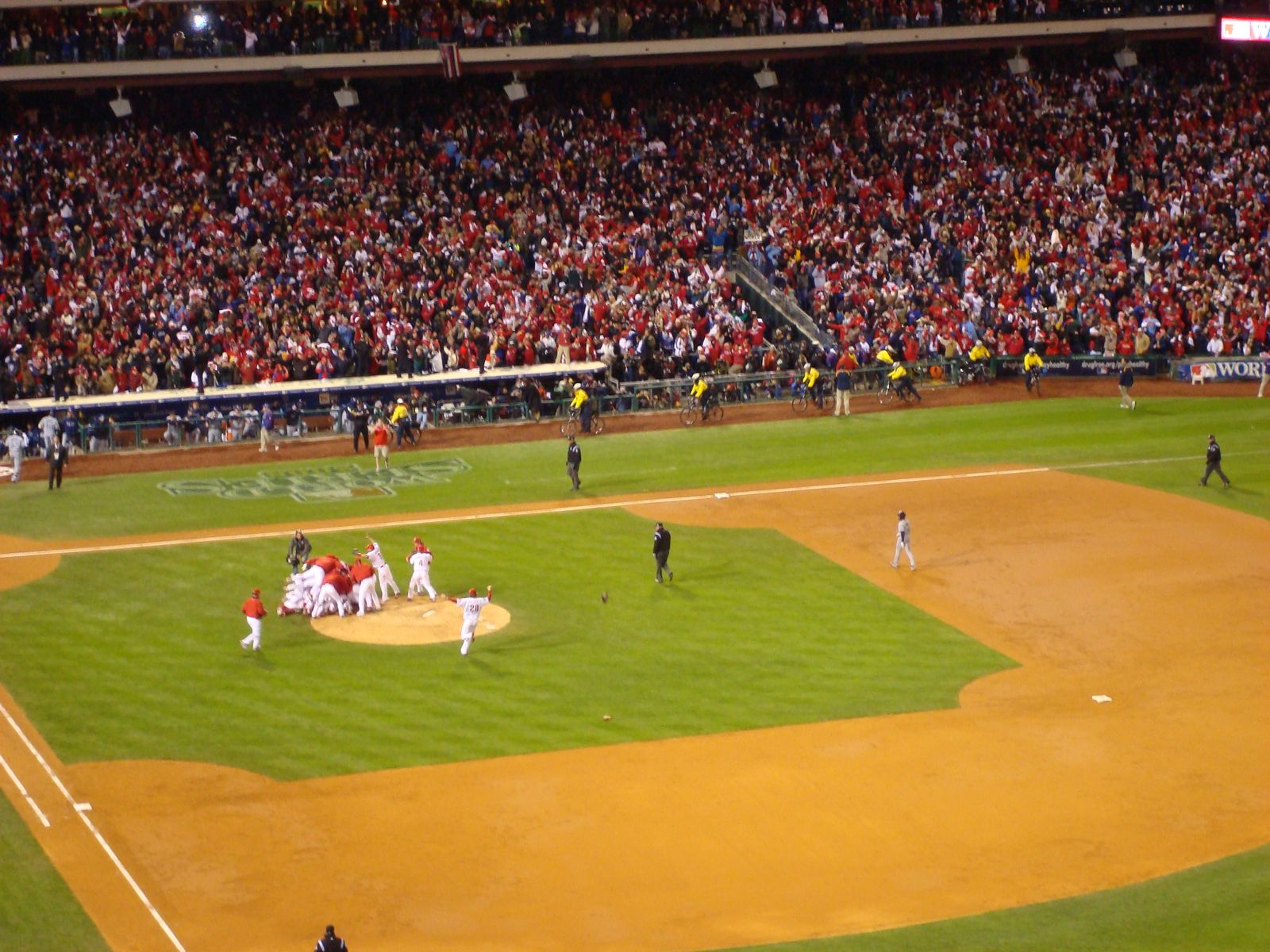
Philadelphia Phillies players rush the field at Citizens Bank Park after winning the 2008 World Series

On June 18, 2007, ironworkers helped raise the final beam in the construction of the Comcast Center at 17th Street and John F. Kennedy Boulevard in Center City Philadelphia. In an attempt to end the curse, workers John Joyce and Dan Ginion attached a small figurine of William Penn to the beam, along with the traditional American flag and small evergreen tree.

After the first William Penn figurine was stolen, it was replaced with a smaller 4-inch figure.

On October 29, 2008, the Philadelphia Phillies won the 2008 World Series in five games against the Tampa Bay Rays, ending the purported curse. It was the first major league professional sports title for the city of Philadelphia since the 1983 NBA Championship. During the TV coverage of the parade which occurred two days later, Comcast aired an ad congratulating the Phillies which featured the small figurine of William Penn standing at the top of the Comcast Center.

On November 27, 2017, the day of the "topping out" of the new tallest building in Philadelphia, the Comcast Technology Center, ironworkers once again placed a new William Penn figurine atop the building's highest beam in hopes of warding off the curse.

On February 4, 2018, the Philadelphia Eagles defeated the New England Patriots in Super Bowl LII 41–33 to win their first Super Bowl in team history, and first championship since the 1960 NFL Championship Game.

While the curse may have been lifted, some Philadelphia fans were left wondering if a new taller building with a new William Penn figurine would have to be constructed for a championship to go to Philadelphia. This was probably the case when the Phillies fell to the New York Yankees in the 2009 World Series and the Houston Astros in the 2022 World Series, and when the Eagles fell to the Kansas City Chiefs in Super Bowl LVII. In each of these instances, a championship had already gone to Philadelphia after the tallest building was completed. This speculation ended when the Eagles went on to win their second Super Bowl on February 9, 2025, when they defeated the Kansas City Chiefs in Super Bowl LIX, 40–22, avenging their loss to the Chiefs in Super Bowl LVII two years prior. This also ended the Presidential Inauguration Curse.

== See also ==
- Curse of the Billy Goat
- Curse of the Bambino
- Curse of Shoeless Joe
