= OLIN =

Urban Design Firm

OLIN architecture firm logo

OLIN, which is legally known as Olin Partnership Limited, is an international landscape architecture, comprehensive planning, and urban design firm founded in Philadelphia in 1976 by Laurie Olin and Robert Hanna. Olin’s staff is composed of landscape architects, architects, project managers, and urban planners. The firm is led by fourteen partners: Laurie Olin, Lucinda Sanders, Dennis McGlade, Susan Weiler, Hallie Boyce, Richard Newton, Skip Graffam, Chris Hanley, Tiffany Beamer, Richard Roark, Jessica Henson, Trevor Lee, Marni Burns and Michael Miller. The current logo typically is represented in all caps. Olin is most recognized for designs such as Bryant Park in New York City, the Washington Monument Grounds in Washington, D.C., the J. Paul Getty Center in Los Angeles, 16th Street Mall in Denver, Colorado, and Columbus Circle in Manhattan.

== History ==
As faculty members of the landscape architecture department of the University of Pennsylvania, Laurie Olin and Robert Hanna founded the partnership Hanna/Olin, Ltd. Through their collaboration in academia, in 1976 Olin and Hanna took on their first project, the design of the Johnson & Johnson Baby Products Corporate Center in Skillman, New Jersey, executed in collaboration with I. M. Pei & Partners, now known as Pei Cobb Freed. The pair continued through other work, such as the ARCO headquarters, Johnson & Johnson World Headquarters, and Denver’s 16th Street Mall.
