= One Liberty Observation Deck =

Observation deck of One Liberty Place in Center City, Philadelphia

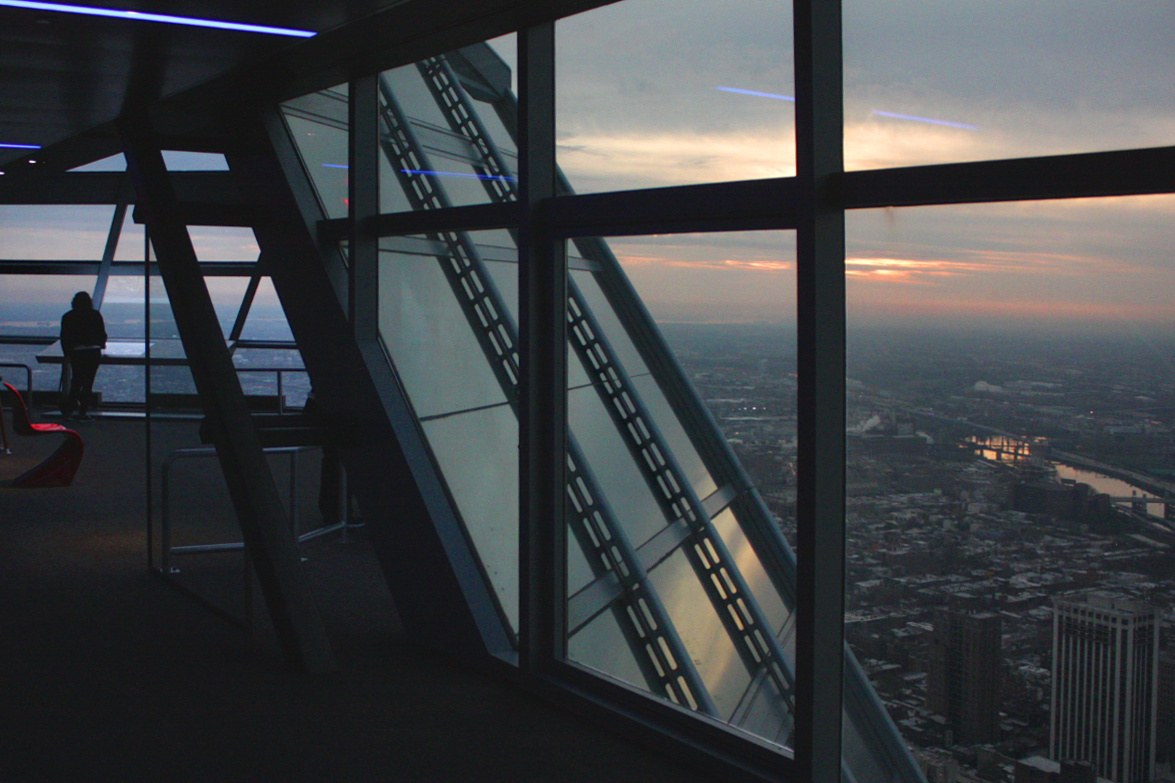
- View of South Philadelphia and the Schuylkill River from the observation deck in December 2015

Philadelphia
- Area: 1650 Market Street, Philadelphia, Pennsylvania, U.S.
- Coordinates: 39.9526°N 75.1681°W
- Status: Closed
- Opening date: November 28, 2015

Ride statistics
- Attraction type: Observation Deck
- Height: 883 ft (269 m)
- Duration: unlimited
- Visitors: 17,241 (2015)
- Construction Cost: 1.7 million USD
- Slogan: Philly From The Top
- Website: Official website
- Wheelchair accessible
- Assistive listening available

One Liberty Observation Deck, also called Philly From The Top, was an 883 ft (269 m) high observation deck that was located on the 57th floor of One Liberty Place in Center City Philadelphia.

The deck was closed permanently in September 2020 due to the COVID-19 pandemic.

== History ==
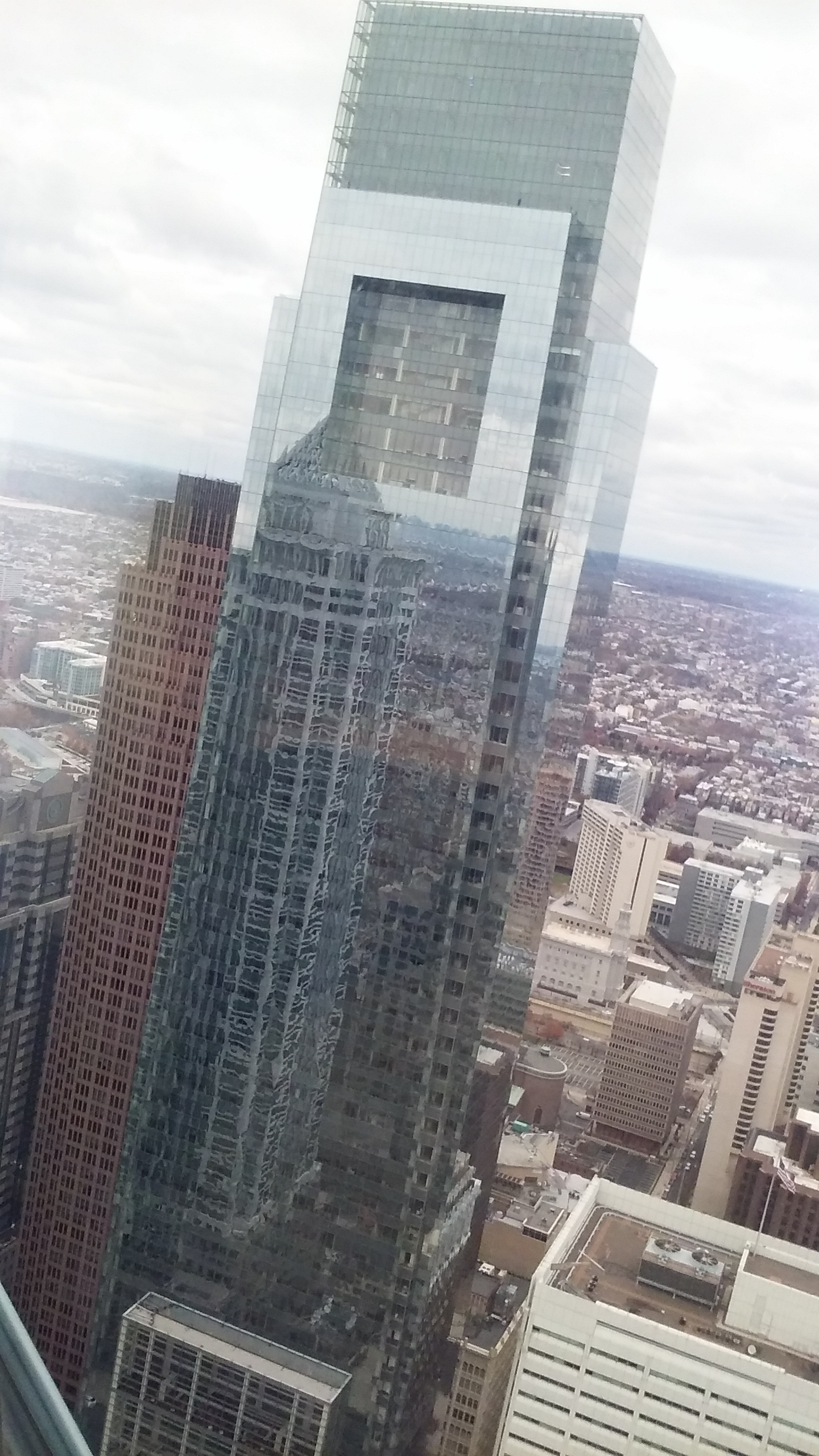
Comcast Center viewed from observation deck in 2016

Paris-based Montparnasse 56 Group (M56) announced in 2014 that it would open an observation deck on the 57th floor of One Liberty Place. The One Liberty Observation Deck, also called Philly from the Top, opened to the public on November 28, 2015.

The observation deck is fully enclosed and offers 360 degree panoramic views of the city from 883 feet above street level, which was the highest public access level and the tallest standing building attraction in Philadelphia as of 2016.

On September 15, 2020, the One Liberty Observation Deck suspended operations indefinitely due to a decline in visitors caused by the COVID-19 pandemic.

== Concept ==
The attraction consisted of three levels, the ground floor entry area, a second-floor ticketing, lobby and gift shop area, and the 57th-floor observation area. After purchasing a ticket, visitors could choose to stand in front of a green screen to have a photograph taken. Visitors then boarded an elevator, where a video with surround sound was presented about the observation deck and the city. Once on the 57th floor, visitors entered an area with tables, seating and vending machines.

The observation area completely encircled the building core with windows in all directions. Multiple interactive maps with electronic sight-seeing tours were available throughout the observation deck.
