= Liberty Property Trust =

American real estate company

- Industry: Real estate investment trust
- Founded: 1972; 54 years ago
- Defunct: February 4, 2020; 6 years ago
- Fate: Acquired by Prologis
- Headquarters: Malvern, Pennsylvania, U.S.
- Key people: William P. Hankowsky, Chairman & CEO; Christopher J. Papa, CFO
- Revenue: ▲$0.719 million (2017)
- Net income: ▼$0.290 million (2017)
- Total assets: ▲$6.439 billion (2017)
- Total equity: ▲$3.148 billion (2017)
- Number of employees: 295 (2017)

Liberty Property Trust was a real estate investment trust that invested in office buildings and industrial properties. As of December 31, 2017, the company owned interests in 461 industrial and 48 office properties comprising 86.0 million square feet.

== History ==
The company traces its history to Rouse & Associates, which was formed in 1972 by Willard Rouse, George Congdon, David Hammers, and Menard Doswell to develop warehouse space in South Jersey.

In 1974, Rouse & Associates purchased the Great Valley Corporate Center (GVCC) in Malvern, Pennsylvania, which was the first office park to incorporate a graduate college, a business development and training center, and a day care center.

In 1987, Rouse & Associates opened One Liberty Place, the first skyscraper in Philadelphia to be taller than Philadelphia City Hall, and the tallest building in Pennsylvania from 1987 to 2007. Elsewhere their UK subsidiary Rouse Kent developed Kings Hill in the United Kingdom.

In 1994, Rouse & Associates changed its name to Liberty Property Trust and became a public company via an initial public offering.

In 1995, the company acquired Lingerfelt Development Corporation in a $125 million transaction.

In 1997, the company acquired 2 portfolios of properties for $130 million.

In 2003, founder and chief executive officer Willard Rouse died from lung cancer.

In 2014, in a joint venture with Comcast, the company began construction of the Comcast Technology Center, which at 1,142 feet (348 m), is the tallest building in the Western Hemisphere outside of Manhattan and Chicago and was designed by Norman Foster, Baron Foster of Thames Bank. The company owns a 20% interest in the project.

In 2016, the company sold a portfolio of 8 properties for $131.1 million, an 8 building portfolio in Herndon, Virginia for $97 million, and a portfolio of 108 properties for $969 million.

On February 4, 2020, the company was acquired by Prologis.
