= Bank of the Southwest Tower =

Canceled building in Houston, Texas

Coordinates: 29.758631°N 95.366791°W

- Interactive map of the Bank of the Southwest Tower area

General information
- Status: Never built
- Location: Louisiana Street; Houston, Texas

Height
- Antenna spire: 1,404 ft (428 m)
- Roof: 1,275 ft (389 m)

Technical details
- Floor count: 82
- Floor area: 200,000 m^{2} (2,200,000 sq ft)

Design and construction
- Architects: Murphy/Jahn, Inc. Architects, also Lloyd Jones Brewer and Associates

The Bank of the Southwest Tower is a unbuilt 1,404 ft (428 m) tall skyscrapers in Downtown Houston, Texas. If completed, it would have been the second tallest building in North America after the Willis Tower in Chicago. With an estimated construction cost of $350–400 million, the project was canceled before construction commenced, due to lack of funds during the economic downturn.

The design created by architect Helmut Jahn of Murphy/Jahn, Inc. Architects was the winner of a design competition in 1982.
