= Lee Copeland =

American architect

Lee G. Copeland (born March 26, 1937) is an American architect and urban designer. He served as Dean of the University of Washington College of Architecture and Urban Planning (now College of Built Environments) from 1972 to 1979 and thereafter as Dean of the University of Pennsylvania Graduate School of Fine Arts (now PennDesign) from 1979 to 1991. He is currently a consulting principal at Mithun.

Copeland was elected a Fellow in the American Institute of Architects in 1979. He won the AIA Seattle Chapter Medal in 2000, and in 2001 he received the AIA/ACSA Topaz Medallion for Excellence in Architectural Education.

== Career ==
Before and during his time as Dean, from 1964 to 1979, Copeland taught in the University of Washington as a teaching assistant and as a professor. Afterwards, he was an Architect in Philadelphia, becoming chairman of the Philadelphia City Planning Commission in the 1980's while being Dean of the University of Pennsylvania. And from 2014 to 2018 he became a member in the City of Seattle Design Commission during his time as Consulting principal at Mithun in 2003.

== Education ==
In 1955, Copeland graduated from Roosevelt High School (Seattle), and went on to pursue a Bachelor of Architecture at the University of Washington, completing it in 1960. Soon after, he finished his Master of City Planning and Master of Architecture at the University of Pennsylvania in 1963.
