= Market East (Philadelphia) =

Neighborhood of Philadelphia, PA, US

Coordinates: 39.9525°N 75.158056°W

Center City East Convention Center Market East
- Neighborhood of Philadelphia
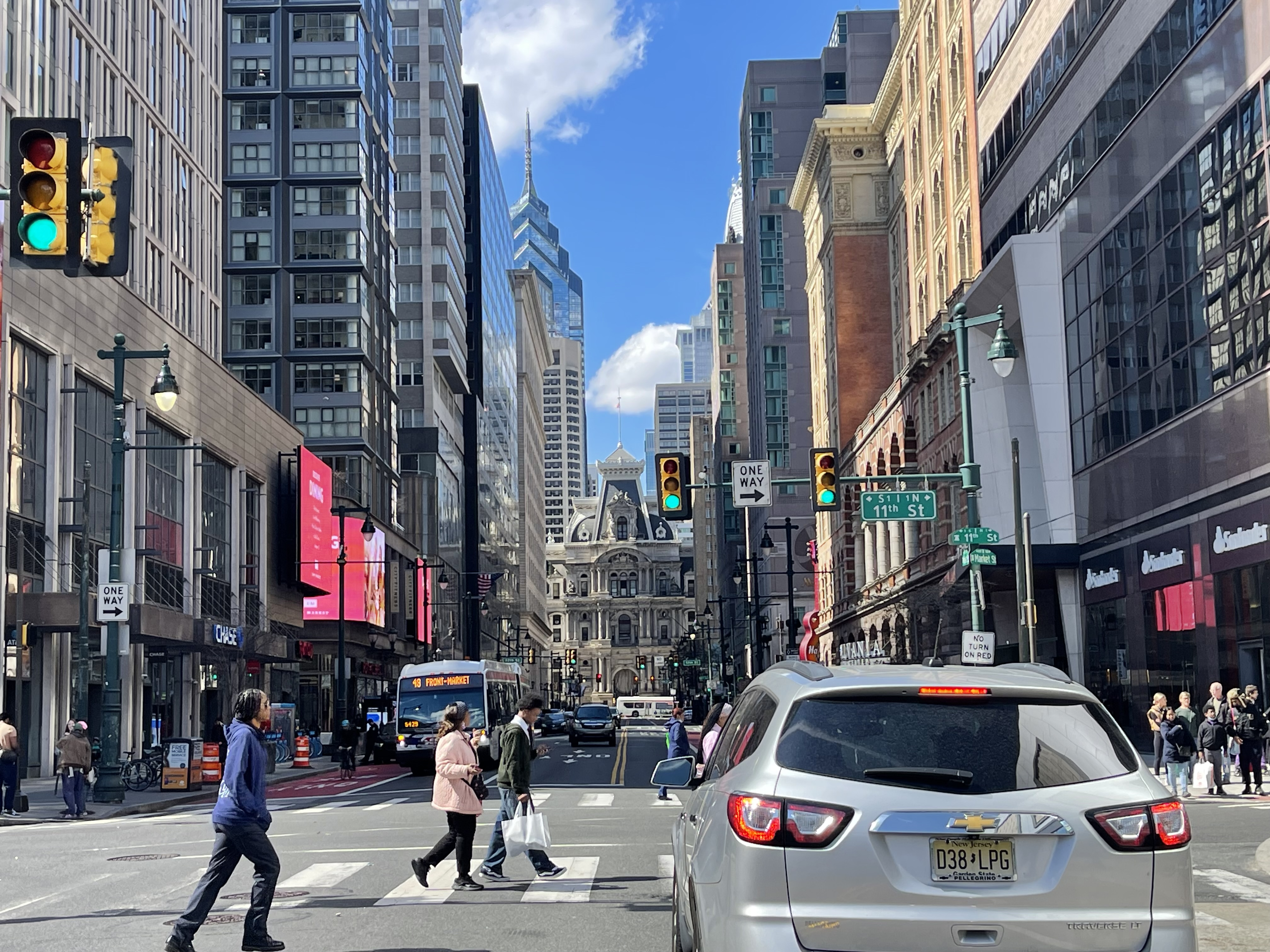
- Market Street near the Reading Terminal building
- Interactive map of Center City East; Convention Center; Market East
- Country: United States
- State: Pennsylvania
- County: Philadelphia County
- City: Philadelphia
- Postal codes: 19106, 19107, and 19147
- Area codes: 215, 267, and 445

Market East is part of the downtown district known as Center City, Philadelphia, Pennsylvania, United States. The area is generally bounded by Arch Street to the north, Chestnut Street to the south, Juniper Street to the west, and 6th Street at Independence Mall West to the east. The area serves as one of the major retail centers and home to the Pennsylvania Convention Center.

== History ==
Market East is a major shopping district and transportation hub for the city, as well as serving the convention district.

The area remained relatively stable until the late 1940s and early 1950s, when shifts in demographics caused a decline in the area's business, due to increased suburbanization and the trend in the retail sector away from the inner city and more towards the suburban malls and shopping centers. Along with the decline, a sizeable amount of land on the western side of Center City, in the neighborhood now known as Penn Center, became available for development; it was previously held by the Pennsylvanian Railroad as part of their Broad Street Station and associated yards, including the infamous Chinese Wall. Under the leadership of then Philadelphia mayor Richardson Dilworth and planning head Edmund Bacon, a massive redevelopment effort was made, with the Market East area falling under the auspices of the Market Street East Redevelopment Area section of the Redevelopment Authority of Philadelphia.

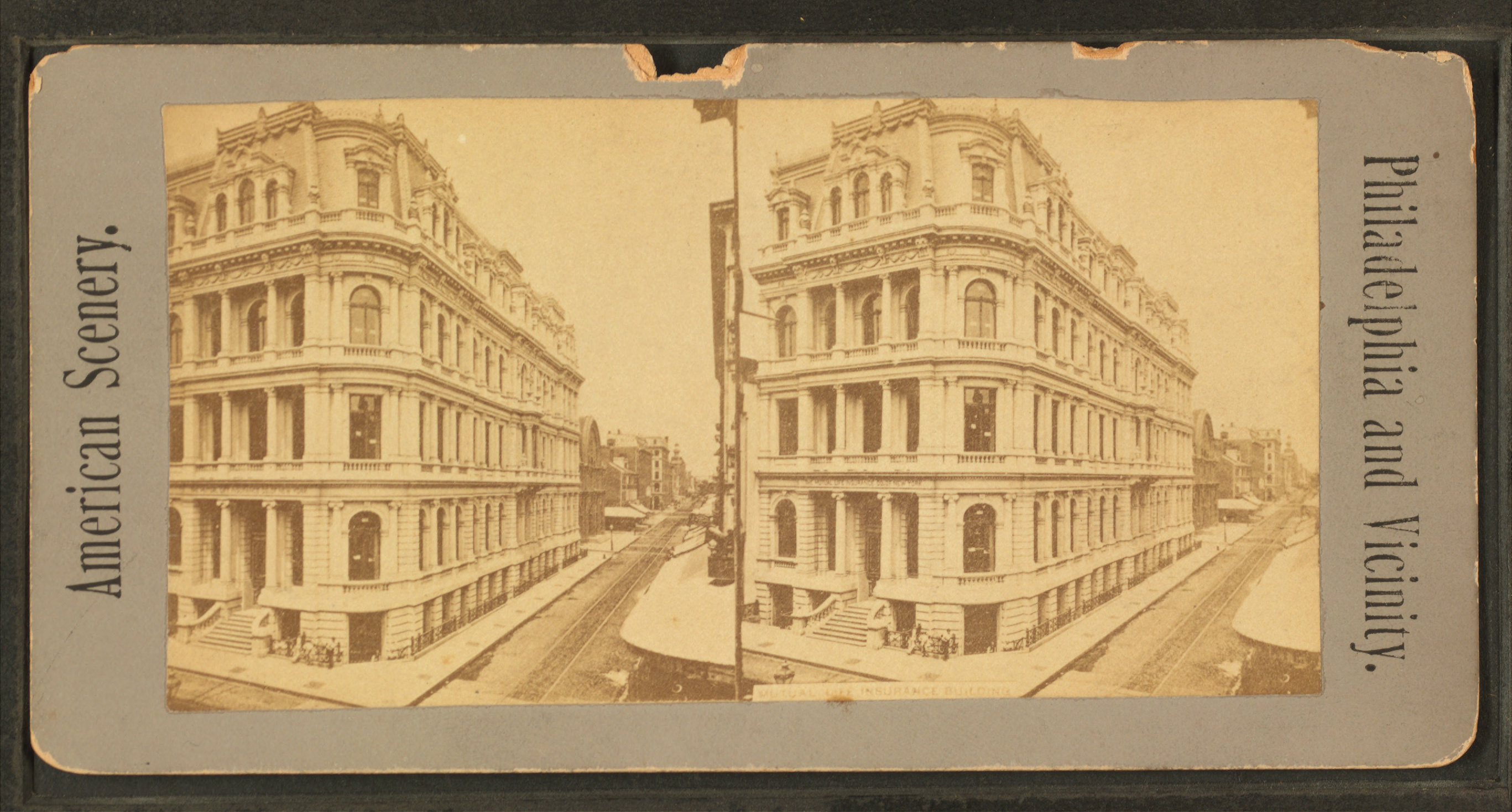
Victory Building at 10th and Chestnut Sts.

Over the next three decades the redevelopment authority significantly changed the face of Market East, with many older buildings being demolished. The major part of the redevelopment took place in the form of four major projects: the construction of The Gallery at Market East [a 2 phased project, which included a JCPenney (which became a Burlington Coat Factory and is now AMC Theatres and Primark)]; the relocation of the Regional Rail lines from the above ground Reading Terminal to the underground Jefferson Station and the corresponding Center City Commuter Connection and One Reading Center (now Aramark Tower); the new United States Courthouse and Detention Facility; and the construction of the Pennsylvania Convention Center and the corresponding new Marriott Hotel, renovation of Reading Terminal and related facilities. Several other projects were also conducted concurrently, including the renovation of the Wanamaker’s department store (now a Macy's), and PSFS Building, (now a Loews Hotel).

Though many of these projects have proven successful, there have been several exceptions, the most notable being the city's failed attempt to redevelop the parcel at the southwest corner of 8th and Market. These failures have also called into question the area's long term viability as a major shopping district, especially concerning the major department stores. None of those now located on Market Street are based in Philadelphia, all having been sold to out-of-town interests, and several have closed, though they have been replaced.

The Gallery is now Fashion District Philadelphia.

== Neighborhood ==
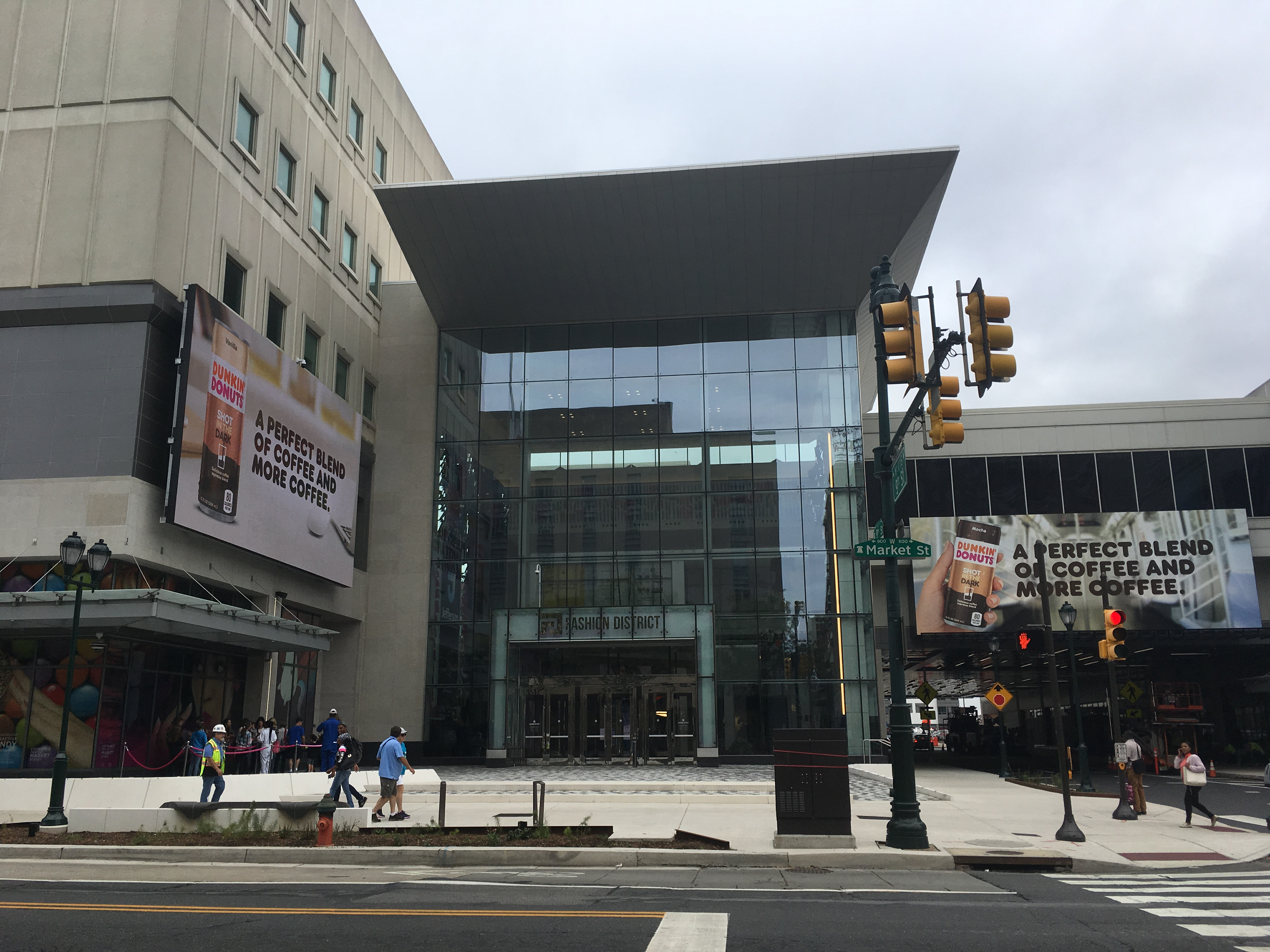
Fashion District Philadelphia

The Center City East area has served as one of Philadelphia’s retail hubs since at least the early 19th century, when groups of merchants, farmers, and fisherman set up shops and stalls along Market Street, then known as High Street, west of the Independence Hall area. Many of these merchants, driven by profitseeking or city regulations, began to seek more permanent facilities. Among these were Philadelphia's flagship department stores: John Wanamaker's Wanamaker's and Justus Clayton Strawbridge and Isaac Hallowell Clothier's Strawbridge and Clothier, both opened in the earliest days of the American Civil War. Along with Lit Brothers, Snellenburg's, Gimbels and Frank & Seder, the six block corridor was once home to six major department stores. Other merchants set up shop along Market Street, and Chestnut street, one block parallel to the south. Many grocers moved their stalls from the median of Market Street to the two main markets at 12th and Market Streets, known as the Farmers' Market and the Franklin Market.

The area also served as a transportation hub for Philadelphia’s two largest rail operators, the Pennsylvania Railroad and the Reading Railroad. The Pennsylvania moved in first, building a freight depot at 13th and Market Streets. But the company abandoned the site by 1875 for locations at Broad Street Station and part of the western bank of the Schuylkill River, leaving the site to become the home of Wanamaker’s.

In 1889, the Reading moved its headquarters and main Philadelphia train depot to a new facility, Reading Terminal, at 12th and Market Streets. The railroad bought out the Farmers' Market and Franklin Market and built a new facility for the markets underneath the trainshed called the Reading Terminal Market.

Several trolley lines and the Market Street Subway also served the area.

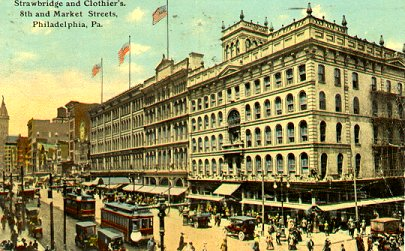
Eighth & Market Streets

Besides the transportation and retail business, the East Market Street area also attracted business, one of the most notable being the Philadelphia Savings Fund Society (PSFS), who opened their signature headquarters on the southwest corner of 12th and Market Streets, the PSFS Building, in 1932. The federal government also established a presence on the parcel bounded by 9th, Market, Chestnut, and 10th Streets, with a Federal Reserve regional headquarters, United States Courthouse, and postal facilities, as well as other government agencies, all mainly built during the late 19th and early 20th centuries. The building is called the Nix Federal Building.

== Sites of interest ==
- Atwater Kent Museum
- Fashion District Philadelphia
- Pennsylvania Convention Center
- Reading Terminal
- Reading Terminal Market
- SEPTA headquarters
- Thomas Jefferson University
- Thomas Jefferson University Hospital
- Wanamaker Building and the Wanamaker Organ
