= Penn Center =

Penn Center may refer to:

- Penn Center, Philadelphia, a high-rise business district on the site of a former railroad right-of-way
- Penn Center (Saint Helena Island, South Carolina), an African-American cultural and educational center
