= Center City Tower (Philadelphia) =

General information
- Status: Never Built, and redesigned of Comcast Center
- Location: Downtown Philadelphia
- Construction started: N/A
- Completed: N/A

Height
- Antenna spire: 1,050 ft (320.1 m)

Technical details
- Floor count: 75

Center City Tower was the working name of a formerly proposed skyscraper in downtown Philadelphia.

Designed and proposed by the firm now known as KlingStubbins (designers of Philadelphia's Penn Center and Bell Atlantic Tower), the building would have risen to a height of 1,050 feet (320 m) and 75 stories, making it the tallest building in The United States outside New York and Chicago, surpassing the height of the Bank of America Plaza in Atlanta. With a floor area of 1,700,000 square feet (160,000 m^{2}), it is one of the largest in Center City.

The building was designed with an oblate footprint and several setbacks to the top culminating in a spire. Renderings depict it being sheathed in blue glass with studios/media center on the ground level.

== History ==
The plot this building was designed to occupy was made available after the One Meridian Plaza fire on February 23, 1991 which left the building uninhabitable. The relative lack of a need for that much office space in Philadelphia ultimately doomed the proposal. In addition, two new highrises - Residences at the Ritz and 1441 Chestnut have occupied and bifurcated the original plot.

A long-lived rumor held that the building was being designed with Comcast Corporation, Philadelphia's most high-profile corporation, in mind. Such a rumor would have been killed on January 5, 2005, the day Comcast Center was officially launched.

== See also ==
- List of tallest buildings in Philadelphia
