= American Commerce Center =

Cancelled skyscraper in Philadelphia

- Interactive map of the American Commerce Center area

General information
- Status: Never built
- Type: Hotel / Office/ Park/ Garden/ Retail
- Location: 1800 Arch Street; Philadelphia, Pennsylvania, U.S.
- Coordinates: 39°57′18″N 75°10′13″W
- Cost: US$800,000,000

Height
- Antenna spire: 1,510 ft (460 m)
- Roof: 1,210 ft (369 m)

Technical details
- Floor count: Office tower: 63, Hotel: 26
- Floor area: 2,200,000 sq ft (200,000 m^{2})

Design and construction
- Architect: Kohn Pedersen Fox
- Developer: Liberty Property Trust

The American Commerce Center was a proposed supertall skyscraper approved for construction in Philadelphia, Pennsylvania but cancelled due to the Great Recession. The Comcast Technology Center, the tallest skyscraper in both Philadelphia and Pennsylvania, now stands on the site.

At 1,510 feet (460 m) tall with 63 floors, the building would have dominated the Philadelphia skyline, standing almost 400 ft (120 m) taller than Philadelphia's tallest building, the Comcast Technology Center. The office tower would have stood on the 19th Street side of Arch Street, and been connected to a 473 ft (144 m), 26-story hotel tower and public plaza along the 18th Street side of the block. The connection would have consisted of a multi-story skybridge with a garden on top.

Of several supertall skyscrapers proposed for Philadelphia, including the Center City Tower and an early version of Comcast Center, this would have been the first to be constructed.

The building would have been the tallest building in the United States by official height, or the second tallest by pinnacle height (including antennas) behind the Willis Tower at 1,729.8 feet (527 m) until the completion of 1,776-foot (541 m) One World Trade Center in New York City in 2014.

On June 19, 2008, Philadelphia City Councilman Darrell Clarke introduced changes for the zoning legislation around 18th and Arch Streets which was the first step towards building the tower. On November 18, 2008, the City Planning Commission signed off on legislation needed for the zoning changes. According to the Philadelphia Daily News, "the developers will have to come back for approval of their building plan if Council passes the zoning bills." On December 11, 2008, the zoning changes in question were unanimously approved by City Council.

On August 19, 2011, Liberty Property Trust acquired the development site from Hill International Real Estate Partners for a reported $40 million, which equates to $612 per square-foot ($2,008 per square-meter). The same company constructed the nearby Comcast Center and Liberty Place complex. However, the project was cancelled.

== See also ==
- List of tallest buildings in the world
- List of tallest buildings in the United States
- List of tallest buildings in Philadelphia
