= Market Street (Philadelphia) =

Major thoroughfare in Philadelphia

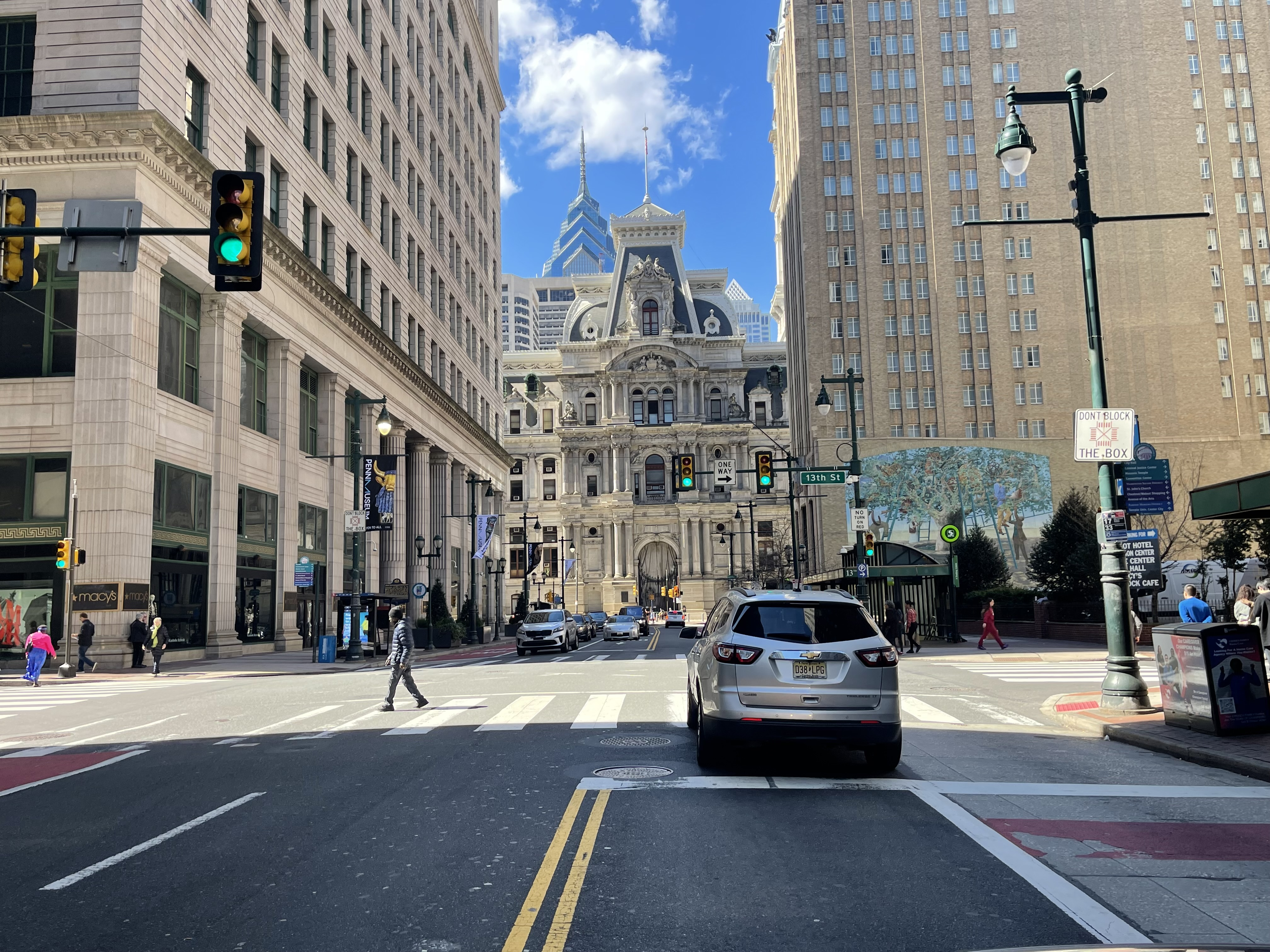
- 13th and Market Streets east of City Hall in Center City Philadelphia
- Interactive map of Market Street
- Part of: SR 2004 from Front Street to Philadelphia City Hall; PA 3 between 38th Street (US 13) and 15th Street (PA 611) in Center City Philadelphia
- Maintained by: PennDOT and City of Philadelphia
- Length: 6.5 mi (10.5 km)
- Coordinates: 39.95266°N 75.16575°W
- West end: PA 3 in Millbourne
- Major junctions: US 13 / PA 3 in University City; I-76 in University City; PA 611 in Center City
- East end: Front Street in Penn's Landing
- North: Arch Street
- South: Chestnut Street

Construction
- Commissioned: 1682

Market Street, originally known as High Street, is a major east–west highway and street in Philadelphia, Pennsylvania, United States. The street is signed as Pennsylvania Route 3 between 38th Street (U.S. Route 13) and 15th Street (PA 611). A short portion of the road continues west from Cobbs Creek Parkway (63rd Street) to Delaware County, adjacent to Philadelphia. The street also serves as the dividing line for the "north" and "south" sides of the city. All north-south addresses in the city start at zero at Market Street.

High Street was the familiar name of the principal street in nearly every English town at the time Philadelphia was founded. But if Philadelphia was indebted to England for the name of High Street, nearly every American town is, in turn, indebted to Philadelphia for its Market Street. Long before the city was laid out or settled, Philadelphia's founder, William Penn, had planned that markets would be held regularly on the 100-foot (30 m) wide High Street.

The city's first market stalls were situated in the center of the thoroughfare starting at Front Street and proceeding west eventually to 8th Street. The stalls soon became covered and were not taken down as planned. Later, additional covered sheds appeared west of Center Square as the city expanded westward. The street began to be called Market Street around 1800. The road's new name was made official by an ordinance in 1858, coincidentally just a year before the market sheds were ordered removed.

Market Street has been called the most historic highway in the United States because of the various historic sites along its eastern section. Many of Benjamin Franklin's activities were centered along Market Street. His house was located near the intersection of Fourth Street, and he may have performed his famous kite-flying experiment near Third and Market Streets.

Over a period of two weeks in June 1776, Thomas Jefferson wrote the Declaration of Independence in a boarding house, known as the Graff or Declaration House, once located at 700 Market Street at the corner of 7th and Market streets.

The mansion of Robert Morris, financier of the American Revolution, was located near 6th and Market Streets. This house, known as the President's House, was used by George Washington and John Adams as their residence during their terms as president prior to the completion of the White House in 1800. The house was located on the site of the northern part of the present-day Liberty Bell Center. Around 1795, Theophilus Cazenove lived on Market Street. Several important finance and publishing firsts also occurred along Market Street between Second and Fourth Streets during the 18th century. Market Street is still one of the principal locations of business and commerce in Philadelphia.

== Route ==
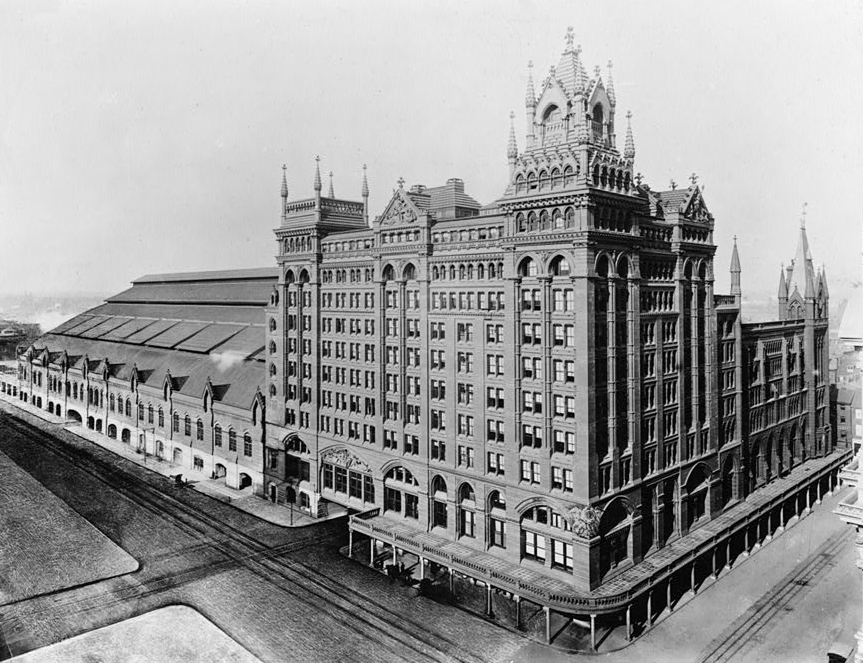
Broad Street Station (demolished 1953), NW corner of Broad and Market Streets, before 1901; Philadelphia architect Frank Furness greatly expanded the station in 1893.

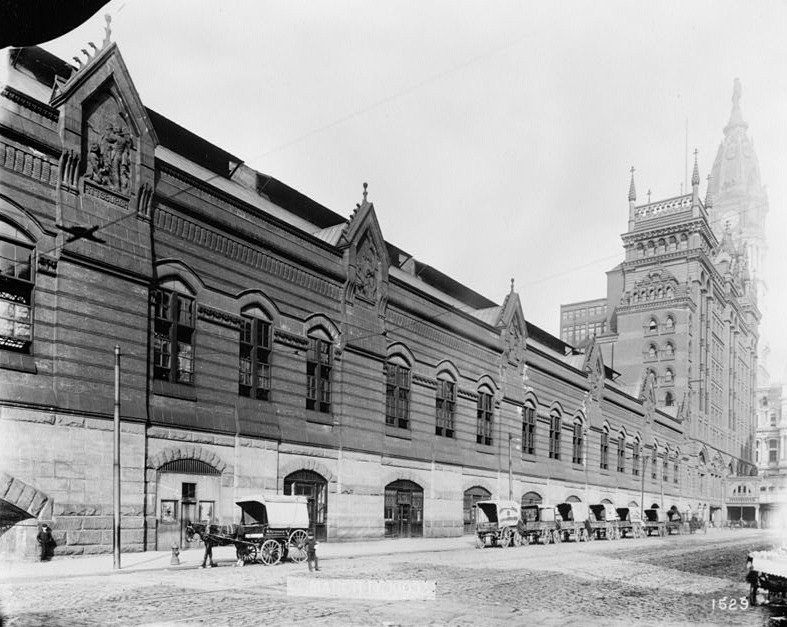
A train-shed wall on Market Street from 15th Street to 16th Street in 1903

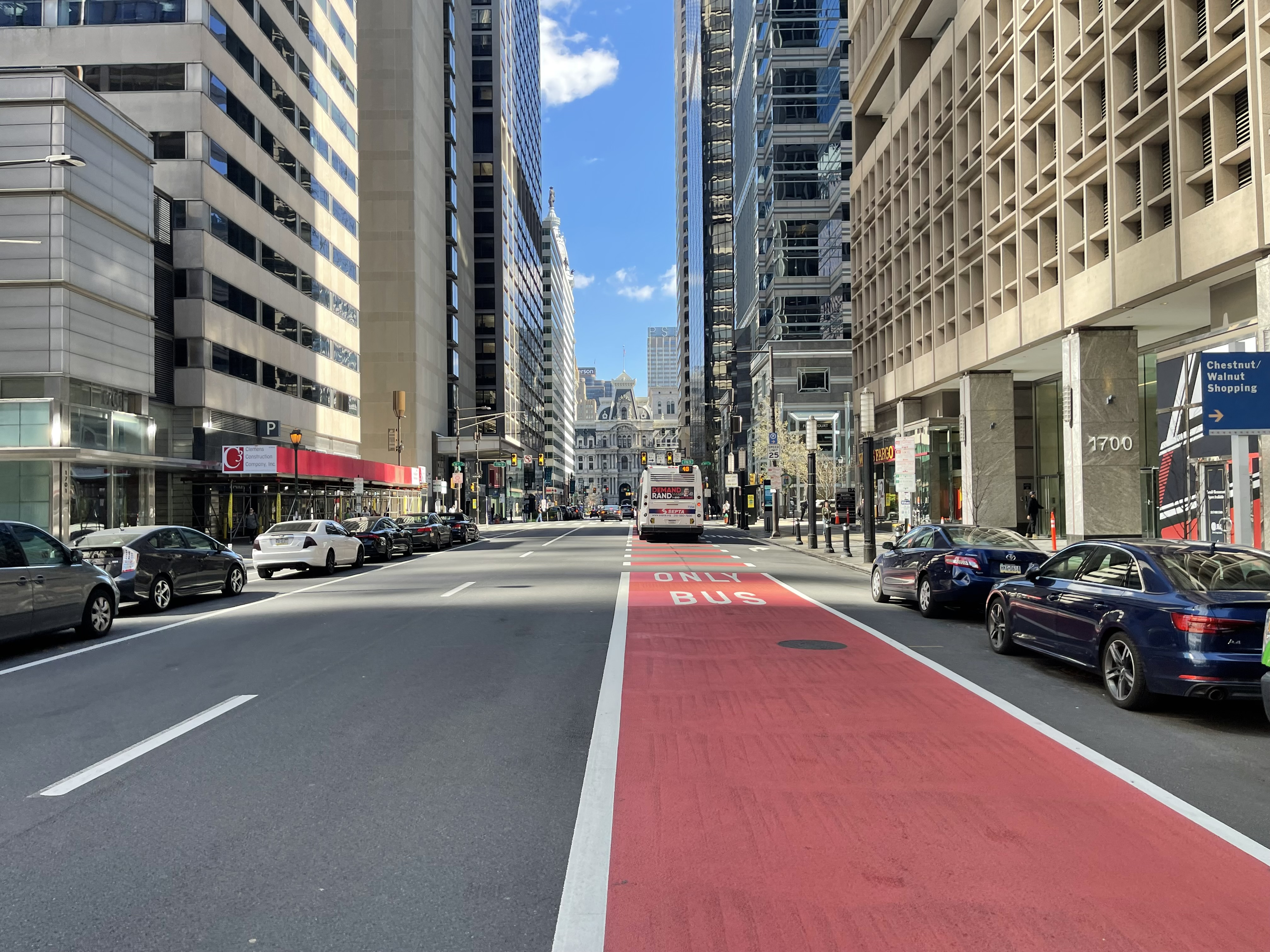
1700 block of Market Street in the Penn Center area west of City Hall

Market Street runs from Millbourne to Front Street in Center City, Philadelphia. At Front Street, a bridge over Interstate 95 brings traffic from Penn's Landing, on the western bank of the Delaware River, onto westbound Market Street. Market Street runs one way, eastbound, between 20th Street and 15th Street, with westbound traffic diverted onto JFK Boulevard.

As of 2023, the entire length of Market Street is part of Philadelphia's High Injury Network, the small fraction of city streets on which the majority of traffic deaths and serious injuries occur. Market Street includes a two-way protected bike lane between 15th and 20th Streets and painted bike lanes between 34th and 63rd Streets.

Market Street is interrupted between 15th Street and Juniper Street by Philadelphia City Hall, and so technically does not intersect with Broad Street. A pedestrian-only path continues Market Street across the City Hall block. Between 12th Street and roughly 20th Street, Market Street is heavily commercial, with office skyscrapers rising on both sides. In the past, there was a connection to Camden, New Jersey by ferry.

The street continues westward, crossing over the Schuylkill River via the Market Street Bridge, into and through University City and West Philadelphia. SEPTA's Market–Frankford Line runs along Market Street, as a subway east of 44th Street and as an elevated line above Market Street, west of there.

== Landmarks ==
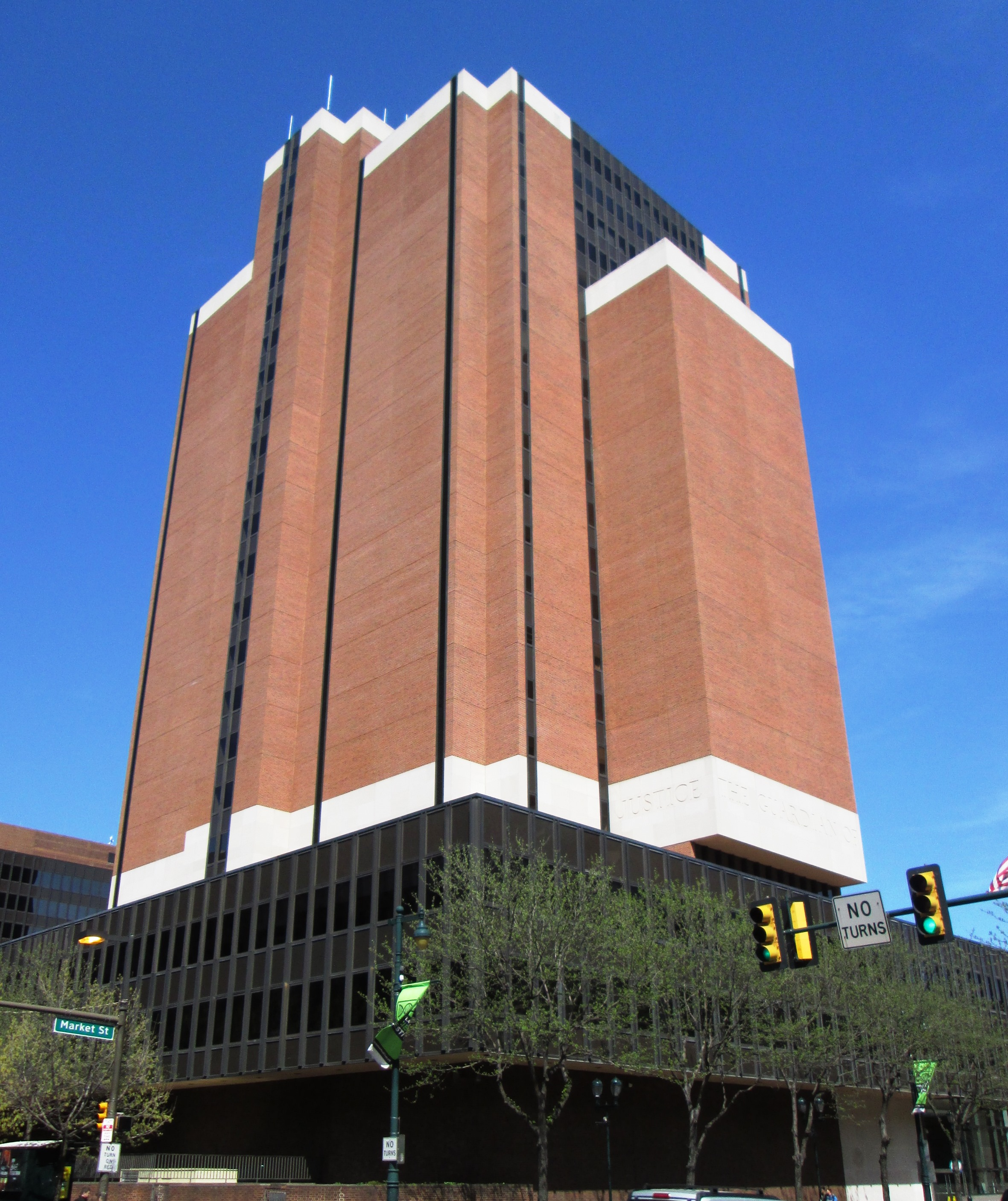
James A. Byrne United States Courthouse, a U.S. federal courthouse at 601 Market Street, houses the U.S. District Court for the Eastern District of Pennsylvania and U.S. Third Circuit Court of Appeals

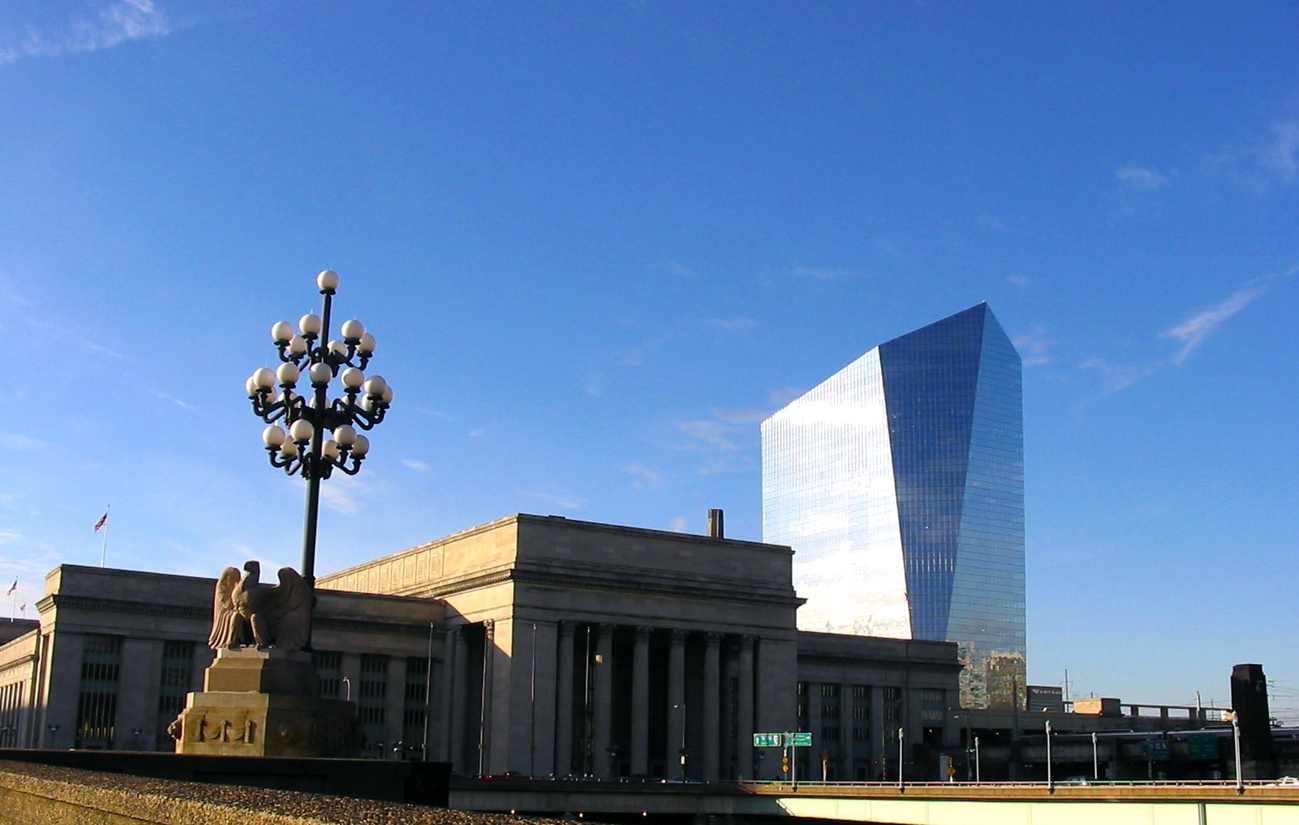
30th Street Station, the third-busiest Amtrak station in nation, at 2955 Market Street

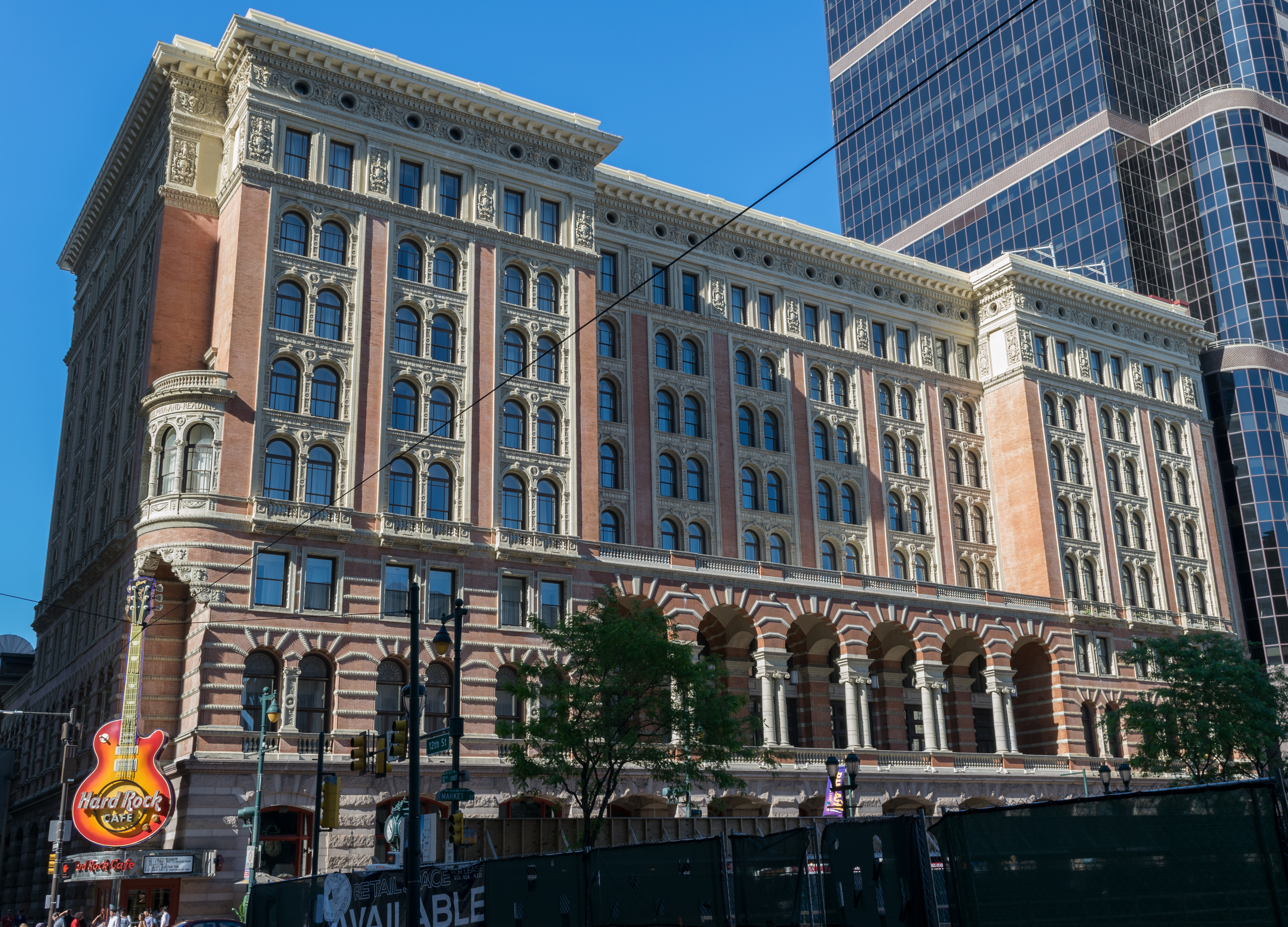
Reading Terminal at 1115-1141 Market Street

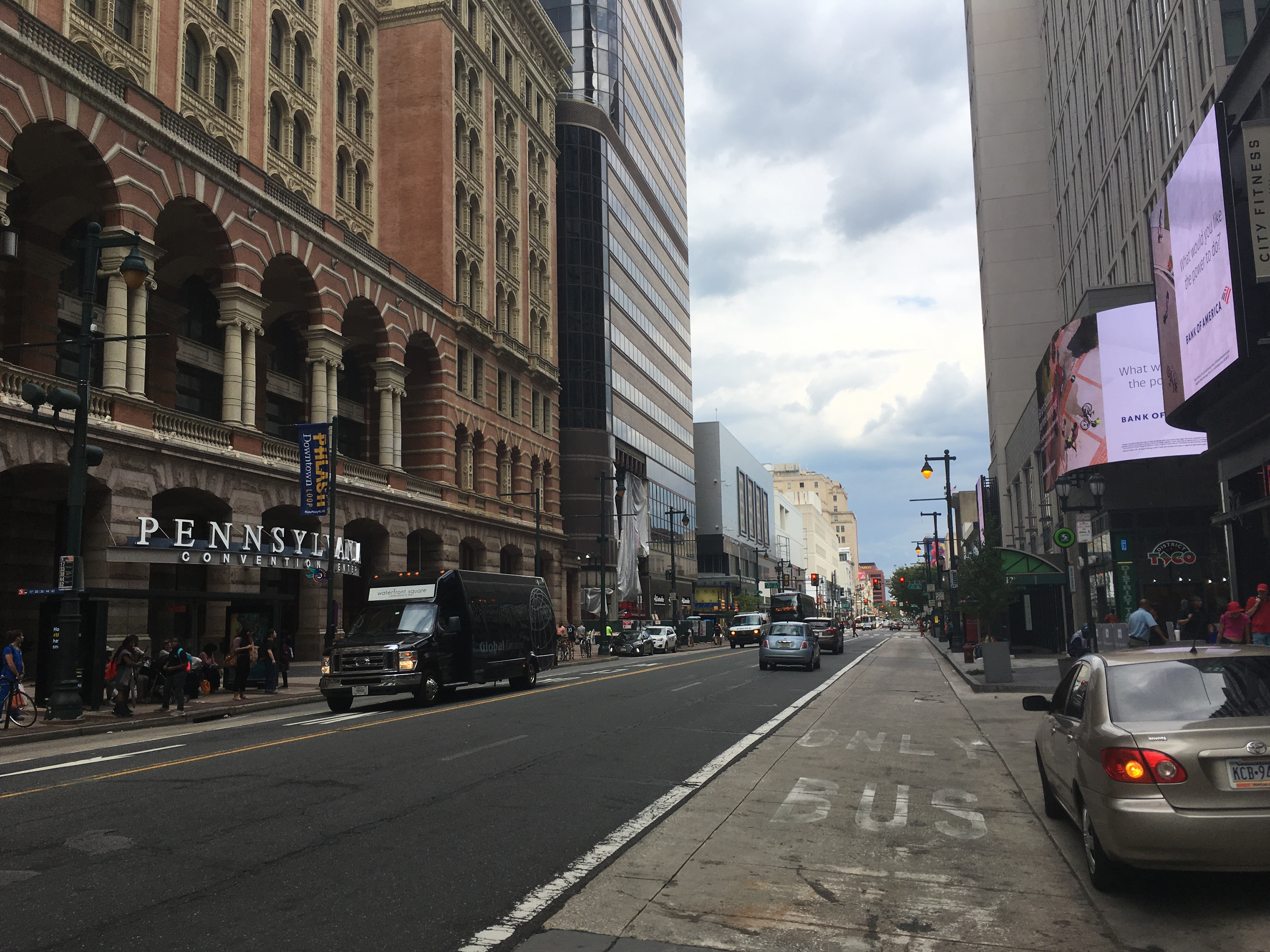
Pennsylvania Convention Center at 12th Street

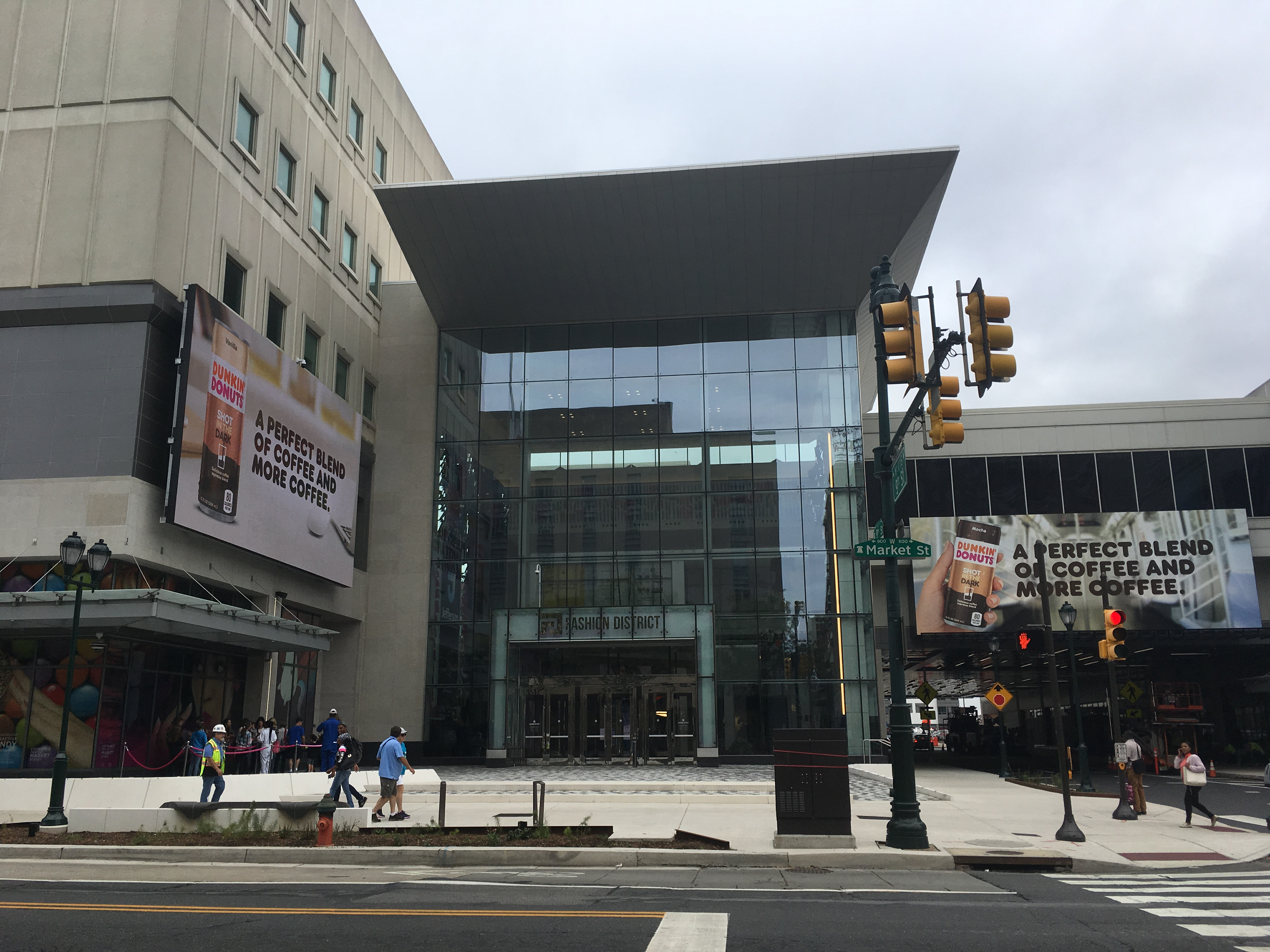
Fashion District Philadelphia entrance at 9th Street and Market Street

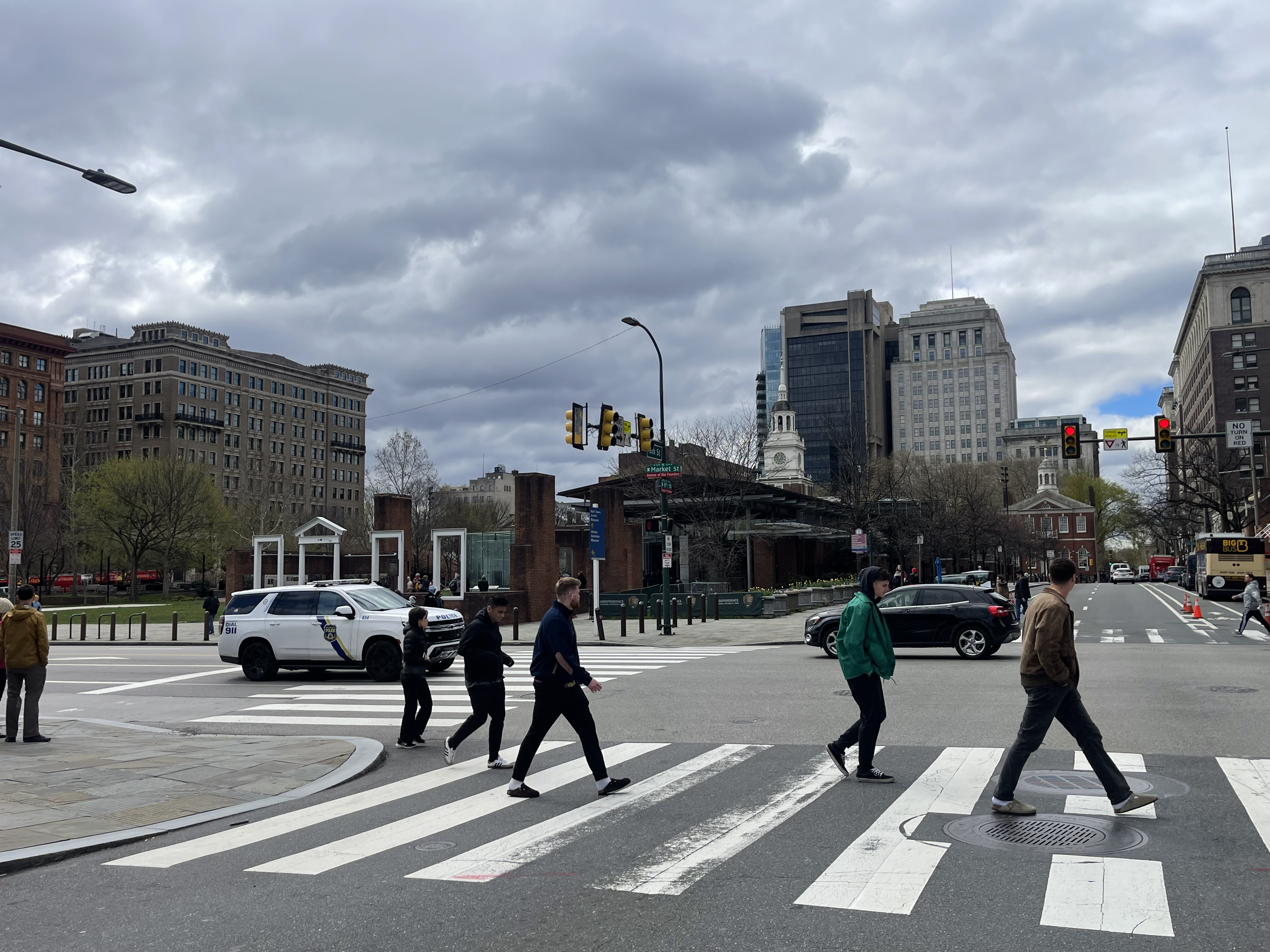
Independence National Historical Park located between 5th and 6th Streets

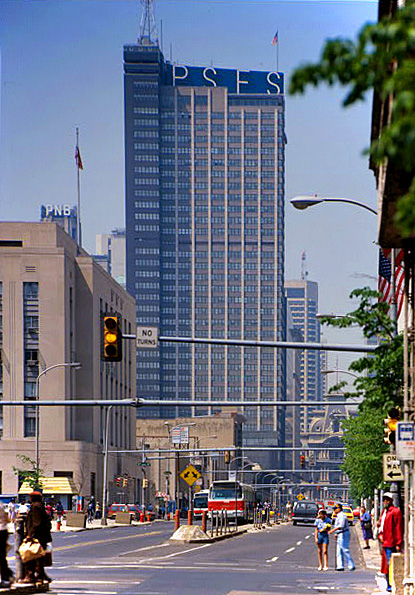
Market Street, looking west from 8th Street, in the mid-1980s

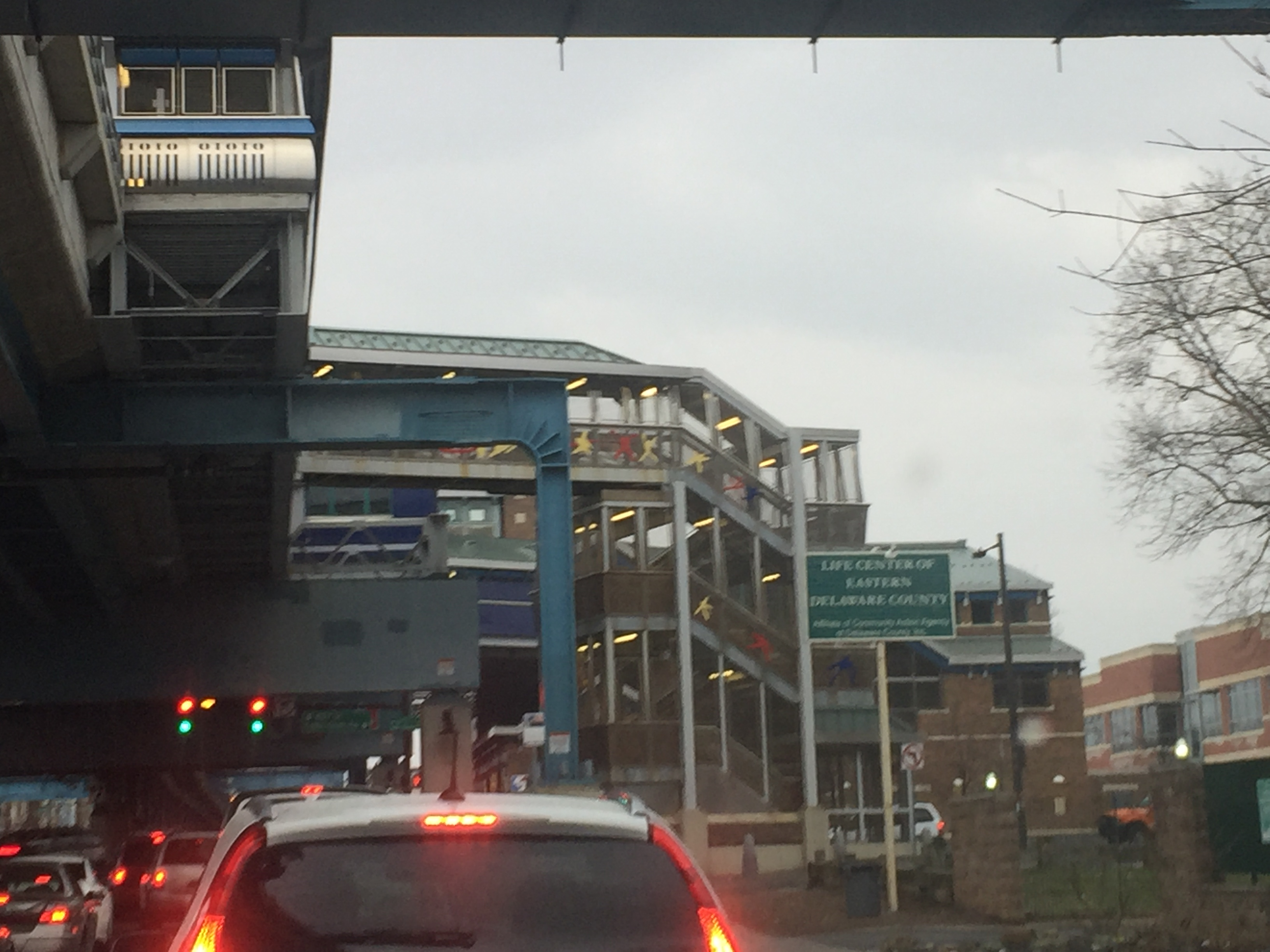
Market Street at 63rd Street at the border with Delaware County

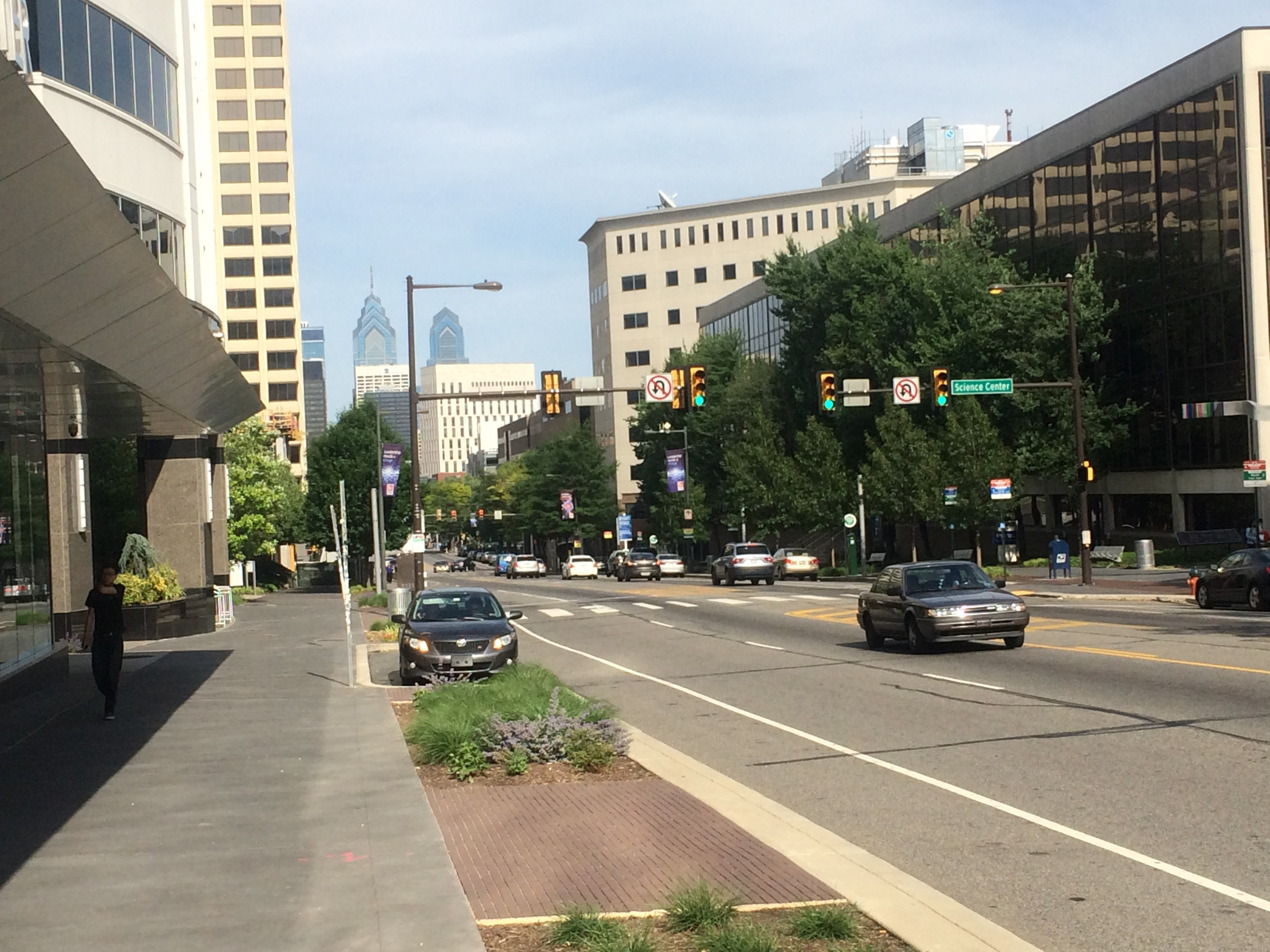
3700 block of Market Street looking east from University City

Independence National Historical Park, home to Independence Hall, Liberty Bell, and National Constitution Center, is located at 5th and Market Streets in the heart of Philadelphia's Old City section. The location, where the Second Continental Congress formed the Continental Army and signed the Declaration of Independence, is the birthplace of the United States as a sovereign nation.

East of the intersection of Front and Market Streets is an entrance to Penn's Landing on the Delaware River.

At 2nd and Market is the historic Christ Church, once the tallest building in North America.

Philadelphia television station WTXF-TV 29 (FOX) is located at Market Street and 4th Street. A ground-level studio with a window overlooks the street. On the same location are the headquarters for Audacy and 94 WIP.

Adjacent to Independence Mall is the National Museum of American Jewish History, which relocated to that location in 2010 and occupies the spot once held by CBS 3 and KYW Newsradio 1060.

The Fashion District Philadelphia shopping mall is located on Market Street between 9th and 12th Streets, and Pennsylvania Convention Center is adjacent to it.

Reading Terminal, the former grand railroad station for the Reading Railroad is located on the northeastern corner of 12th and Market streets. It now serves as the grand entrance to the Pennsylvania Convention Center.

The PSFS Building, the first International Style building in the U.S., is at Market and 12th streets.

Philadelphia City Hall stands atop Market Street's intersection with Broad Street. Commuters can access the Market–Frankford Line, Broad Street Line, Subway Surface Lines, and Suburban Station through the 15th Street Headhouse and other access points across from Philadelphia City Hall.

One Liberty Place, formerly Philadelphia's tallest building, is located at the southeast corner of 17th and Market Streets. In June 2007, it was surpassed in height by the Comcast Center, located a block to the north.

June 5th Memorial Park is located at 22nd and Market Street in remembrance of the six people who lost their lives as a result of the collapse of a Salvation Army Thrift Store. The one story building collapsed while full of shoppers due to negligent demolition of the building next door. Fourteen others were injured when trapped under the rubble.

30th Street Station, located at 30th and Market streets, is one of the nation's busiest passenger rail stations, and a major Amtrak, intercity, SEPTA Regional Rail, and NJ Transit commuter trains.

In the University City section of Philadelphia, Market Street crosses through the campuses of Drexel University and University City Science Center. As a result, the section of Market Street along University City is also signed "Avenue of Technology".

== In popular culture ==
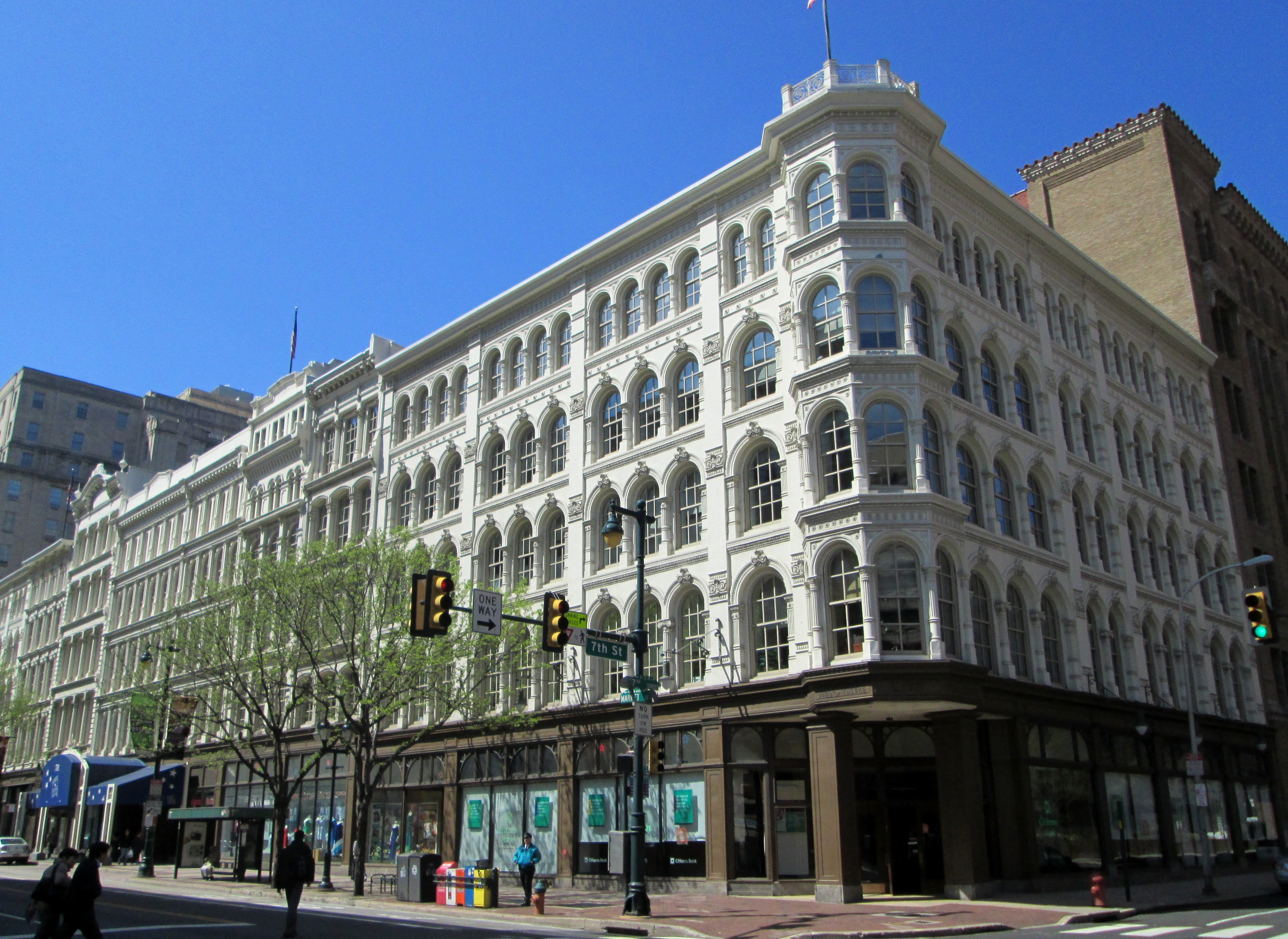
The former Lit Brothers Department Store, now Market Place East

- 1933: The lyrics to the Bing Crosby song "Down the Old Ox Road" reference "Market Street in Philly";
- 2005 to 2012: Market Street and the neon sign at Penn's Landing are featured in the opening the television show It's Always Sunny in Philadelphia; and
- 2008: The lyrics to the ZOX song "The Wait, Part II" reference, "They took down all the yellow lights at Market Street and 4th."

== Other names ==
- Market East from Juniper Street at the west to 6th Street (Independence Mall West) at the east. The Market East area has served as one of Philadelphia's retail hubs since at least the early 19th century, when groups of merchants, farmers, and fishermen set up shops and stalls along Market Street, then known as High Street, west of the Independence Hall area.
- Market West from 15th Street to 30th Street. This area plays host commercial office space, with numerous skyscrapers, including One Liberty Place, Commerce Square, 2000 Market Street, and the BNY Mellon Center.
- Avenue of Technology (from 34th Street to 38th Street). This section of Market Street was distinguished by "turquoise-and-black lightpost banners." The area is home to many technology-related institutions.
- The 700 block of Market Street is known as Emma Chappell Way in honor of Emma C. Chappell
- Pennsylvania Route 3 from the Philadelphia City Hall at 15th Street to 38th Street
