= BNY Mellon Center (Philadelphia) =

Skyscraper in Pennsylvania. US

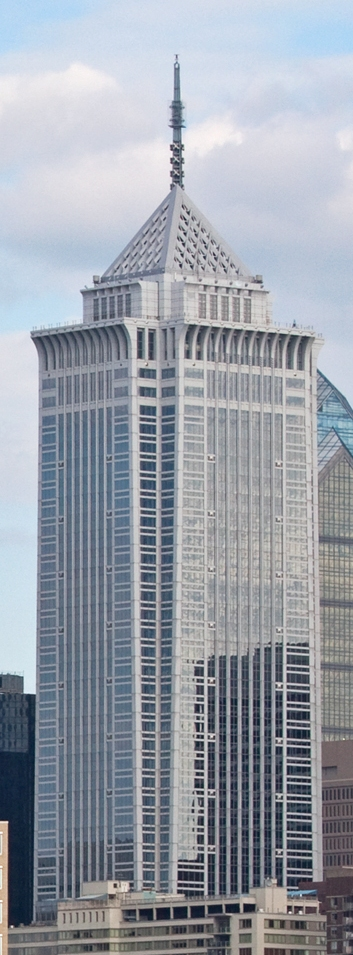
- BNY Mellon Center in Center City Philadelphia

- Location within Philadelphia BNY Mellon Center (Philadelphia) (Pennsylvania) BNY Mellon Center (Philadelphia) (the United States)

General information
- Architectural style: Postmodernism
- Location: 1735 Market Street, Philadelphia, Pennsylvania, U.S.
- Coordinates: 39°57′13″N 75°10′10″W
- Completed: 1990

Height
- Antenna spire: 824 ft (251 m)
- Roof: 792 ft (241 m)

Technical details
- Floor count: 54

Design and construction
- Architect: Kohn Pedersen Fox Associates
- Developer: CommonWealth REIT
- Structural engineer: WSP Cantor Seinuk
- Main contractor: Turner Construction

BNY Mellon Center is a 54-story office skyscraper located in Philadelphia, Pennsylvania. The height to its structural top is 792 ft (241 m). Construction was completed in 1990. The building was formerly called Mellon Bank Center until 2009, when it was renamed as part of a branding initiative for the newly formed Bank of New York Mellon. In early 2019, the building was sold for $451.6 million, a record for a Philadelphia property.

== History ==
The building was designed by the architectural firm of Kohn Pedersen Fox. It stands on the former site of the city's Greyhound bus terminal. The address of the building is 1735 Market Street (between Market Street and John F. Kennedy Boulevard, just east of 18th Street.

BNY Mellon Center is part of a complex of office buildings known as Penn Center and as such is alternately known as Nine Penn Center. A shopping concourse underneath the building connects to an adjacent winter garden and Suburban Station. BNY Mellon Center is the fifth tallest building in Philadelphia.

A private club called the Pyramid Club occupies the 52nd floor of the building.

== Tenants ==
Tenants have included the headquarters of Sunoco and FMC Corporation. It also houses offices of Aon Corporation, The Boston Consulting Group, UBS, Goldman Sachs, and law firms including Ballard Spahr, Hangley Aronchick Segal Pudlin & Schiller, Hogan Lovells, and Montgomery McCracken Walker & Rhoads.

== In popular culture ==
The lobby of this building made an appearance in the 1993 film Philadelphia, starring Tom Hanks and Denzel Washington.

== See also ==
- List of skyscrapers
- List of tallest buildings in Philadelphia
- List of tallest buildings in the world
- List of tallest buildings in the United States
- List of masts
- List of towers
- BNY Mellon Center (Pittsburgh)
