= Penn Center, Philadelphia =

Neighborhood of Philadelphia, Pennsylvania

Coordinates: 39°57′13.44″N 75°10′9.80″W

Penn Center
- Neighborhood of Philadelphia
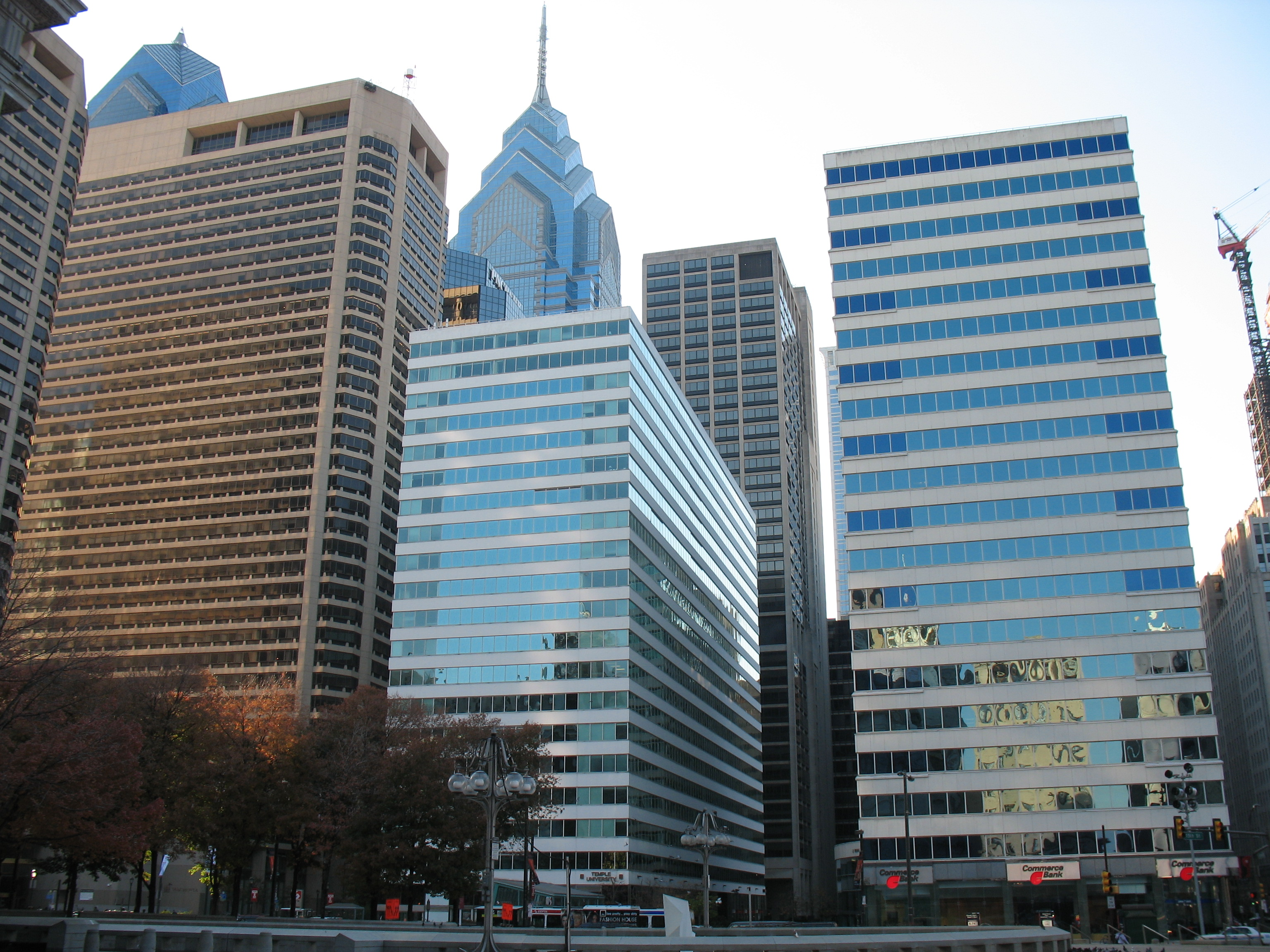
- Penn Center in 2006

- Country: United States
- State: Pennsylvania
- County: Philadelphia County
- City: Philadelphia
- Area codes: 215, 267, and 445

Penn Center is the heart of Philadelphia's central business district. It takes its name from the nearly five million square foot office and retail complex it contains. It lies between 15th and 19th Streets, and between John F. Kennedy Boulevard and Market Street. It is credited with bringing Philadelphia into the era of modern office buildings.

== History ==
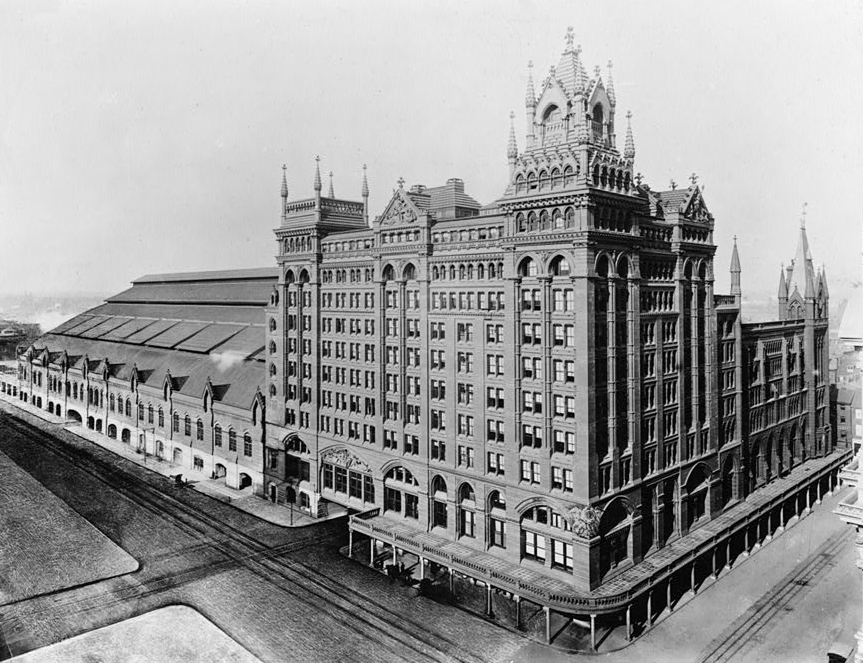
Broad Street Station (demolished 1953), NW corner of Broad and Market Streets, before 1901; Philadelphia architect Frank Furness greatly expanded the station in 1893.

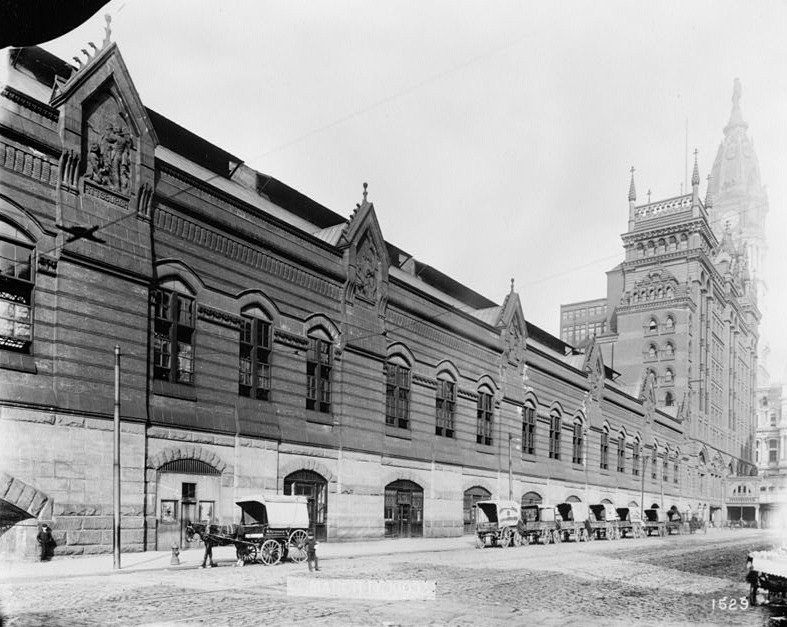
A 1903 photograph of the train-shed wall on Market Street from 15th Street to 16th Street

In 1881, the Pennsylvania Railroad brought passenger service into the center of the city, and constructed the first Broad Street Station just west of City Hall. The sea of iron pillars holding up the PRR's elevated trackbed was replaced in the 1890s by a 10-block stone viaduct to the Schuylkill River. This created a block-wide barrier known as The Chinese Wall, cutting the western portion of the city in half and discouraging development there.

At the time, most commercial activity in Center City was east of Broad Street, which is why the SEPTA Market-Frankford Line has no stops between 30th Street Station and 15th Street. The stations at 19th Street and 22nd Street are served by SEPTA Subway-Surface Trolley Lines.

In 1925, the Pennsylvania Railroad announced its intention to leave Broad Street Station, freeing the land for redevelopment. The railroad, which had both outgrown the station and was operationally burdened by its stub-end nature, would move its operations to the newly constructed 30th Street Station and Suburban Station. Those stations were completed and in operation by 1933, but a number of factors, including the Great Depression which stalled the planned redevelopment, forced the railroad to continue utilizing Broad Street Station for certain types of trains (such as the Philadelphia-New York "Clockers", and steam-powered trains of the Pennsylvania-Reading Seashore Lines) for nearly two more decades. Broad Street Station was not completely vacated until 1952, during the term of Mayor Joseph S. Clark. Plans for the demolition of the Chinese Wall and accompanying train station were finalized and both were razed in 1953.

Ed Bacon, executive director of the Philadelphia City Planning Commission, came up with a master plan for a four-block area to be cleared. Bacon named the new site Penn Center with the hopes that it would become a business center and model for future development. His plan for the redevelopment of the site included three large office towers, a pedestrian mall, and an underground concourse where retail and business was to be located. He picked architect Vincent Kling to design most of the buildings over Louis Kahn, another possible contender. The Pennsylvania Railroad wanted to sell the land off in smaller lots for piecemeal development, but Mayor Clark used his political clout to see that Bacon's plan was realized. The plan was implemented with public support, but it would come into criticism later from urban planners, and notable journalist Jane Jacobs for placing vibrant urban activity underground leaving no use for the above ground promenade, and failing to account for actual human usage of the space.

Throughout the mid-to-late 20th century, the city's office sector began to move west into the Penn Center area, thanks to planning efforts. As the office-working population became more suburbanized, convenient access to Suburban Station began to take precedence to city planners over local city transit access.

Today, the Penn Center name is officially attached to 11 mid- and highrise office buildings.

Most of the buildings of the complex are connected to the Suburban Station retail concourse (renovated in 2007) and by extension the Center City Concourse. The buildings share a loading and delivery entrance on Commerce Street which connects to all the buildings underground. Although not part of Penn Center, the Comcast Center connects to the concourse; such an option was also examined for the canceled American Commerce Center.

== Buildings ==
The numbers of the Penn Center buildings generally radiate clockwise around One Penn Center, the oldest building. John F. Kennedy Boulevard, on which many Penn Center buildings front, was known as Pennsylvania Boulevard until 1964, after the assassination of John F. Kennedy.

Name	Address	Height Feet (meters)	Floors	Year	Notes
One Penn Center (Suburban Station)	1617 JFK Boulevard	330 feet (101 m)	20 floors	1929	Originally Broad Street Suburban Station; headquarters of the Pennsylvania Railroad 1930–1957, known as the Transportation Building. Office building completely renovated by Richard I. Rubin & Co. in 1983.
Two Penn Center	1500 JFK Boulevard	271 feet (83 m)	20 floors	1958	
Three Penn Center	1515 Market Street	270 feet (82 m)	20 floors	1953	Currently known as 1515 Market Street, this was the first of the modern Penn Center buildings.
Four Penn Center	1600 JFK Boulevard	275 feet (89 m)	20 floors	1964	Completely renovated in 2001.
Five Penn Center	1601 Market Street	490 feet (149 m)	36 floors	1970	Tallest Penn Center building before the completion of the Mellon Bank Center.
Six Penn Center	1701 Market Street	248 feet (76 m)	18 floors	1957	Now known as The Morgan, Lewis & Bockius Building. Headquarters of the PRR 1957–1968, Penn Central 1968–1976, and Conrail 1976–1991. Completely renovated in 1999.
Seven Penn Center	1635 Market Street	269 feet (82 m)	21 floors	1966	
Eight Penn Center	1628 JFK Boulevard	284 feet (87 m)	23 floors	1982	Site was originally an ice skating rink.
Nine Penn Center (BNY Mellon Center)	1735 Market Street	792 feet (241 m)	54 floors	1990	Site was originally Greyhound Bus Terminal.
Ten Penn Center	1801 Market Street	306 feet (93 m)	28 floors	1980	Lobby completely renovated in 2000.
Eleven Penn Center	1835 Market Street	425 feet (130 m)	29 floors	1986	An unusual hexagonally shaped building with mansard roof.
Sheraton Hotel			27 floors	1957	Demolished; former site of the Public Defender Building and current site of Comcast Center.
Penn Center Inn			22 floors	1958	Demolished in 1990 to make way for the second IBX Tower, which was never built. Site remained undeveloped until construction of a residential tower in 2016.
